= 1916 United States presidential election in Oklahoma =

- November 7, 1916

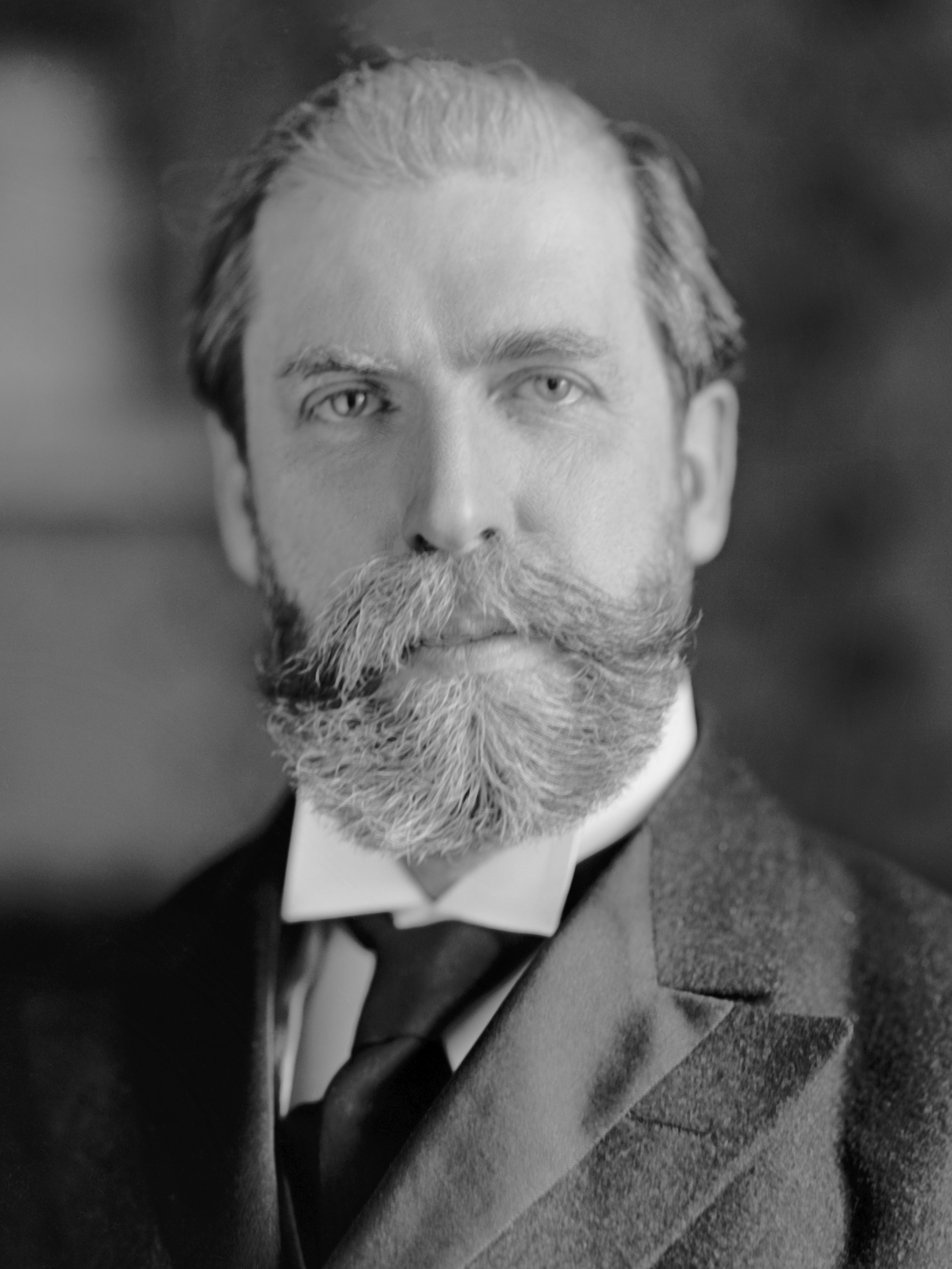

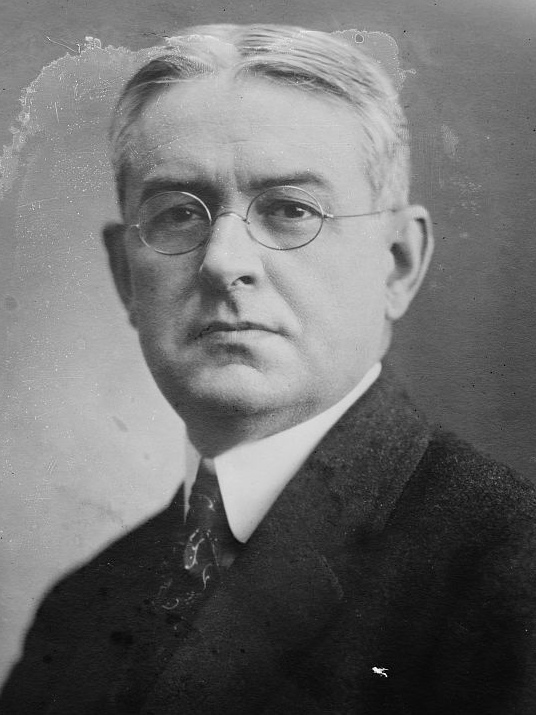
Nominee	Woodrow Wilson	Charles Evans Hughes	Allan L. Benson
Party	Democratic	Republican	Socialist
Home state	New Jersey	New York	New York
Running mate	Thomas R. Marshall	Charles W. Fairbanks	George R. Kirkpatrick
Electoral vote	10	0	0
Popular vote	148,133	97,233	45,091
Percentage	50.65%	33.25%	15.43%
County results
Wilson
30–40%
40–50%
50–60%
60–70%
70–80%
Hughes
30–40%
40–50%
President before election
Woodrow Wilson
Democratic
Elected President
Woodrow Wilson
Democratic

The 1916 United States presidential election in Oklahoma took place on November 7, 1916, as part of the 1916 United States presidential election.

In its early years, Oklahoma was a “Solid South” Democratic state whose founding fathers like "Alfalfa Bill" Murray and Charles N. Haskell had disfranchised most of its black population via literacy tests and grandfather clauses, the latter of which would be declared unconstitutional in Guinn v. United States. Partly owing to the absence of the poll taxes found in other Southern states due to the strength of populism amongst the state's white settlers, the state became a stronghold of the Socialist Party in the 1910s, especially in the southeast and the northwestern Plains.

Oklahoma voters overwhelmingly voted for Democratic incumbent Wilson, over the Republican nominee, Associate Justice Charles Evans Hughes.

Despite a strong showing from the Socialist candidate Allan L. Benson, the state was won handily by President Wilson. He garnered 50.65 percent of the vote, compared to Justice Hughes who won 33.25 percent of the vote. Wilson carried the state by a margin of 17.4 percent. Oklahoma proved to be the best showing for Benson of any state in this election, where he gained 15.43 percent the vote.

This election continued the Democratic trend in the state. Oklahoma would only vote Republican in the elections of 1920 and 1928 until the trend flipped after the 1952 presidential election.

== Results ==
General Election Results
Party	Pledged to	Elector	Votes
Democratic Party	Woodrow Wilson	Frank P. Davis	148,113
Democratic Party	Woodrow Wilson	Jess W. Watts	147,596
Democratic Party	Woodrow Wilson	C. F. Rose	147,587
Democratic Party	Woodrow Wilson	D. A. McDougal	147,438
Democratic Party	Woodrow Wilson	Charles A. Coakley	147,438
Democratic Party	Woodrow Wilson	Howard Weber	147,356
Democratic Party	Woodrow Wilson	M. A. Mitchell	147,302
Democratic Party	Woodrow Wilson	J. J. Spencer	145,805
Democratic Party	Woodrow Wilson	Harry H. Smith	144,502
Democratic Party	Woodrow Wilson	J. W. Reece	142,858
Republican Party	Charles Evans Hughes	C. Lincoln McGuire	97,233
Republican Party	Charles Evans Hughes	William S. Bell	96,840
Republican Party	Charles Evans Hughes	Geo. W. Sutton	96,771
Republican Party	Charles Evans Hughes	Wirt Randolph	96,764
Republican Party	Charles Evans Hughes	E. M. Lowe	96,749
Republican Party	Charles Evans Hughes	Logan G. Hysmith	96,698
Republican Party	Charles Evans Hughes	J. N. Jones	96,535
Republican Party	Charles Evans Hughes	I. K. Revelle	96,444
Republican Party	Charles Evans Hughes	J. R. Eckles	96,110
Republican Party	Charles Evans Hughes	J. C. Denton	95,214
Socialist Party	Allan L. Benson	W. D. Hayman	45,527
Socialist Party	Allan L. Benson	C. G. Russell	45,190
Socialist Party	Allan L. Benson	J. T. Cumbie	44,947
Socialist Party	Allan L. Benson	I. N. Johnson	44,921
Socialist Party	Allan L. Benson	H. J. Peters	44,896
Socialist Party	Allan L. Benson	Alonzo Poling	44,873
Socialist Party	Allan L. Benson	A. R. Bradshaw	44,851
Socialist Party	Allan L. Benson	E. L. Moore	44,748
Socialist Party	Allan L. Benson	Thomas L. Buie	44,714
Socialist Party	Allan L. Benson	R. L. Thurmond	44,164
Prohibition Party	J. Frank Hanly	M. Simpson Allen	1,646
Prohibition Party	J. Frank Hanly	A. H. Crawford	1,627
Prohibition Party	J. Frank Hanly	D. A. Holmes	1,627
Prohibition Party	J. Frank Hanly	G. E. Rouch	1,620
Prohibition Party	J. Frank Hanly	Howard C. Ramsey	1,618
Prohibition Party	J. Frank Hanly	Leonidas Tucker	1,618
Prohibition Party	J. Frank Hanly	J. E. Brewer	1,612
Prohibition Party	J. Frank Hanly	Samuel M. Smith	1,612
Prohibition Party	J. Frank Hanly	E. V. Potter	1,611
Prohibition Party	J. Frank Hanly	Geo. A. Chatfield	1,610
Progressive Party	None	L. Haynes Buxton	234
Progressive Party	None	F. W. Smith	231
Progressive Party	None	S. W. Campbell	229
Progressive Party	None	Samuel Blair	227
Progressive Party	None	J. E. Jones	225
Progressive Party	None	S. J. Storm	223
Progressive Party	None	H. A. Kroeger	223
Progressive Party	None	T. M. Fyle	220
Progressive Party	None	Evart C. Phenis	220
Progressive Party	None	Seward Mutersbaugh	216
Votes cast (Note: Based on totals for highest elector on each ticket)			292,753

=== Results by county ===
County	Woodrow Wilson Democratic		Charles Evans Hughes Republican		Allan L. Benson Socialist		Frank Hanly Prohibition		No Candidate Progressive "Bull Moose"		Margin		Total votes cast
County	#	%	#	%	#	%	#	%	#	%	#	%	Total votes cast
Adair	1,190	49.15%	1,010	41.72%	212	8.76%	7	0.29%	2	0.08%	180	7.43%	2,421
Alfalfa	1,390	41.94%	1,378	41.58%	471	14.21%	68	2.05%	7	0.21%	12	0.36%	3,314
Atoka	1,479	50.31%	925	31.46%	524	17.82%	9	0.31%	3	0.10%	554	18.84%	2,940
Beaver	1,382	49.82%	913	32.91%	433	15.61%	43	1.55%	3	0.11%	469	16.91%	2,774
Beckham	1,850	56.49%	527	16.09%	889	27.15%	7	0.21%	2	0.06%	961 (Note: In this county where Hughes ran third behind Wilson and Benson, margin given is Wilson vote minus Benson vote and percentage margin Wilson percentage minus Benson percentage.)	29.34%	3,275
Blaine	1,214	37.15%	1,339	40.97%	678	20.75%	36	1.10%	1	0.03%	-125	-3.82%	3,268
Bryan	2,974	59.40%	1,267	25.30%	757	15.12%	8	0.16%	1	0.02%	1,707	34.09%	5,007
Caddo	2,735	44.25%	2,272	36.76%	1,112	17.99%	56	0.91%	6	0.10%	463	7.49%	6,181
Canadian	2,200	51.66%	1,590	37.33%	422	9.91%	43	1.01%	4	0.09%	610	14.32%	4,259
Carter	2,949	60.09%	1,013	20.64%	935	19.05%	6	0.12%	5	0.10%	1,936	39.45%	4,908
Cherokee	1,594	48.97%	1,379	42.37%	273	8.39%	8	0.25%	1	0.03%	215	6.61%	3,255
Choctaw	1,945	55.11%	957	27.12%	614	17.40%	11	0.31%	2	0.06%	988	28.00%	3,529
Cimarron	387	50.19%	238	30.87%	138	17.90%	8	1.04%	0	0.00%	149	19.33%	771
Cleveland	1,753	54.19%	885	27.36%	579	17.90%	18	0.56%	0	0.00%	868	26.83%	3,235
Coal	1,418	50.11%	824	29.12%	566	20.00%	18	0.64%	4	0.14%	594	20.99%	2,830
Comanche	2,130	51.13%	1,221	29.31%	790	18.96%	20	0.48%	5	0.12%	909	21.82%	4,166
Cotton	1,500	58.71%	685	26.81%	366	14.32%	4	0.16%	0	0.00%	815	31.90%	2,555
Craig	1,901	50.77%	1,647	43.99%	189	5.05%	6	0.16%	1	0.03%	254	6.78%	3,744
Creek	3,496	45.77%	2,820	36.92%	1,281	16.77%	32	0.42%	10	0.13%	676	8.85%	7,639
Custer	1,771	45.22%	1,507	38.48%	595	15.19%	40	1.02%	3	0.08%	264	6.74%	3,916
Delaware	1,227	53.42%	837	36.44%	221	9.62%	7	0.30%	5	0.22%	390	16.98%	2,297
Dewey	992	36.59%	796	29.36%	891	32.87%	26	0.96%	6	0.22%	101	3.73%	2,711
Ellis	960	37.46%	983	38.35%	590	23.02%	28	1.09%	2	0.08%	-23	-0.90%	2,563
Garfield	2,347	39.81%	2,854	48.41%	632	10.72%	56	0.95%	6	0.10%	-507	-8.60%	5,895
Garvin	2,697	59.62%	804	17.77%	1,001	22.13%	19	0.42%	3	0.07%	1,696	37.49%	4,524
Grady	3,243	60.55%	1,272	23.75%	819	15.29%	18	0.34%	4	0.07%	1,971	36.80%	5,356
Grant	1,700	47.42%	1,517	42.32%	294	8.20%	72	2.01%	2	0.06%	183	5.10%	3,585
Greer	1,675	66.28%	369	14.60%	480	18.99%	3	0.12%	0	0.00%	1,195	47.29%	2,527
Harmon	1,091	73.03%	147	9.84%	255	17.07%	1	0.07%	0	0.00%	836	55.96%	1,494
Harper	798	42.29%	662	35.08%	408	21.62%	15	0.79%	4	0.21%	136	7.21%	1,887
Haskell	1,486	50.44%	976	33.13%	477	16.19%	5	0.17%	2	0.07%	510	17.31%	2,946
Hughes	2,187	52.00%	1,219	28.98%	791	18.81%	2	0.05%	7	0.17%	968	23.01%	4,206
Jackson	2,096	65.44%	409	12.77%	684	21.35%	13	0.41%	1	0.03%	1,412	44.08%	3,203
Jefferson	1,739	60.76%	493	17.23%	621	21.70%	8	0.28%	1	0.03%	1,118	39.06%	2,862
Johnston	1,727	54.63%	756	23.92%	671	21.23%	5	0.16%	2	0.06%	971	30.72%	3,161
Kay	2,340	44.00%	2,482	46.67%	373	7.01%	115	2.16%	8	0.15%	-142	-2.67%	5,318
Kingfisher	1,364	38.60%	1,728	48.90%	417	11.80%	24	0.68%	1	0.03%	-364	-10.30%	3,534
Kiowa	2,279	51.49%	1,017	22.98%	1,101	24.88%	24	0.54%	5	0.11%	1,178	26.62%	4,426
Latimer	950	48.49%	663	33.84%	335	17.10%	10	0.51%	1	0.05%	287	14.65%	1,959
Le Flore	2,576	49.77%	1,944	37.56%	643	12.42%	9	0.17%	4	0.08%	632	12.21%	5,176
Lincoln	2,258	39.43%	2,387	41.69%	1,047	18.29%	31	0.54%	3	0.05%	-129	-2.25%	5,726
Logan	1,701	37.00%	2,270	49.38%	552	12.01%	63	1.37%	11	0.24%	-569	-12.38%	4,597
Love	1,125	64.07%	266	15.15%	363	20.67%	2	0.11%	0	0.00%	762	43.39%	1,756
Major	762	31.99%	946	39.71%	636	26.70%	33	1.39%	5	0.21%	-184	-7.72%	2,382
Marshall	1,352	55.78%	449	18.52%	618	25.50%	5	0.21%	0	0.00%	734	30.28%	2,424
Mayes	1,574	51.93%	1,229	40.55%	226	7.46%	0	0.00%	2	0.07%	345	11.38%	3,031
McClain	1,541	56.74%	680	25.04%	492	18.11%	2	0.07%	1	0.04%	861	31.70%	2,716
McCurtain	1,763	54.89%	795	24.75%	643	20.02%	9	0.28%	2	0.06%	968	30.14%	3,212
McIntosh	1,743	54.43%	898	28.04%	552	17.24%	8	0.25%	1	0.03%	845	26.39%	3,202
Murray	1,305	61.59%	458	21.61%	350	16.52%	5	0.24%	1	0.05%	847	39.97%	2,119
Muskogee	4,004	58.23%	2,532	36.82%	324	4.71%	14	0.20%	2	0.03%	1,472	21.41%	6,876
Noble	1,346	47.68%	1,243	44.03%	214	7.58%	17	0.60%	3	0.11%	103	3.65%	2,823
Nowata	1,355	47.36%	1,322	46.21%	178	6.22%	6	0.21%	0	0.00%	33	1.15%	2,861
Okfuskee	1,337	52.80%	670	26.46%	516	20.38%	8	0.32%	1	0.04%	667	26.34%	2,532
Oklahoma	7,971	54.73%	5,291	36.33%	1,215	8.34%	77	0.53%	10	0.07%	2,680	18.40%	14,564
Okmulgee	2,406	47.75%	1,860	36.91%	754	14.96%	15	0.30%	4	0.08%	546	10.84%	5,039
Osage	2,052	51.22%	1,524	38.04%	420	10.48%	7	0.17%	3	0.07%	528	13.18%	4,006
Ottawa	1,875	50.07%	1,642	43.85%	215	5.74%	13	0.35%	0	0.00%	233	6.22%	3,745
Pawnee	1,491	43.19%	1,396	40.44%	528	15.30%	33	0.96%	4	0.12%	95	2.75%	3,452
Payne	2,140	44.50%	1,767	36.74%	833	17.32%	60	1.25%	9	0.19%	373	7.76%	4,809
Pittsburg	3,441	55.42%	1,879	30.26%	866	13.95%	22	0.35%	1	0.02%	1,562	25.16%	6,209
Pontotoc	2,418	56.39%	913	21.29%	936	21.83%	16	0.37%	5	0.12%	1,482	34.56%	4,288
Pottawatomie	3,276	50.61%	2,042	31.55%	1,119	17.29%	29	0.45%	7	0.11%	1,234	19.06%	6,473
Pushmataha	1,059	49.10%	645	29.90%	449	20.82%	4	0.19%	0	0.00%	414	19.19%	2,157
Roger Mills	1,148	50.77%	538	23.79%	565	24.99%	7	0.31%	3	0.13%	583	25.79%	2,261
Rogers	1,900	48.96%	1,435	36.98%	531	13.68%	15	0.39%	0	0.00%	465	11.98%	3,881
Seminole	1,444	44.42%	872	26.82%	921	28.33%	11	0.34%	3	0.09%	523	16.09%	3,251
Sequoyah	1,632	48.89%	1,179	35.32%	515	15.43%	8	0.24%	4	0.12%	453	13.57%	3,338
Stephens	2,343	57.88%	607	15.00%	1,077	26.61%	17	0.42%	4	0.10%	1,266	31.27%	4,048
Texas	1,349	54.64%	807	32.69%	295	11.95%	17	0.69%	1	0.04%	542	21.95%	2,469
Tillman	2,250	69.08%	625	19.19%	367	11.27%	13	0.40%	2	0.06%	1,625	49.89%	3,257
Tulsa	4,497	48.67%	3,857	41.74%	849	9.19%	27	0.29%	10	0.11%	640	6.93%	9,240
Wagoner	1,040	49.71%	749	35.80%	299	14.29%	3	0.14%	1	0.05%	291	13.91%	2,092
Washington	1,839	46.85%	1,727	44.00%	317	8.08%	41	1.04%	1	0.03%	112	2.85%	3,925
Washita	2,107	55.68%	958	25.32%	703	18.58%	14	0.37%	2	0.05%	1,149	30.36%	3,784
Woods	1,417	42.93%	1,358	41.14%	473	14.33%	51	1.54%	2	0.06%	59	1.79%	3,301
Woodward	1,130	38.65%	1,092	37.35%	665 (Note: In this county, all other Benson electors totalled either 600 or 601 votes.)	22.74%	35	1.20%	2	0.07%	38	1.30%	2,924
Totals	148,113 (Note: Totals actually sum to 148,123 votes.)	50.65%	97,233	33.25%	45,190 (Note: Totals actually sum to 45,151.)	15.45%	1,646	0.56%	234	0.08%	50,880	17.40%	292,416

== See also ==
- United States presidential elections in Oklahoma
