= 1980 United States presidential election in Oklahoma =

- November 4, 1980

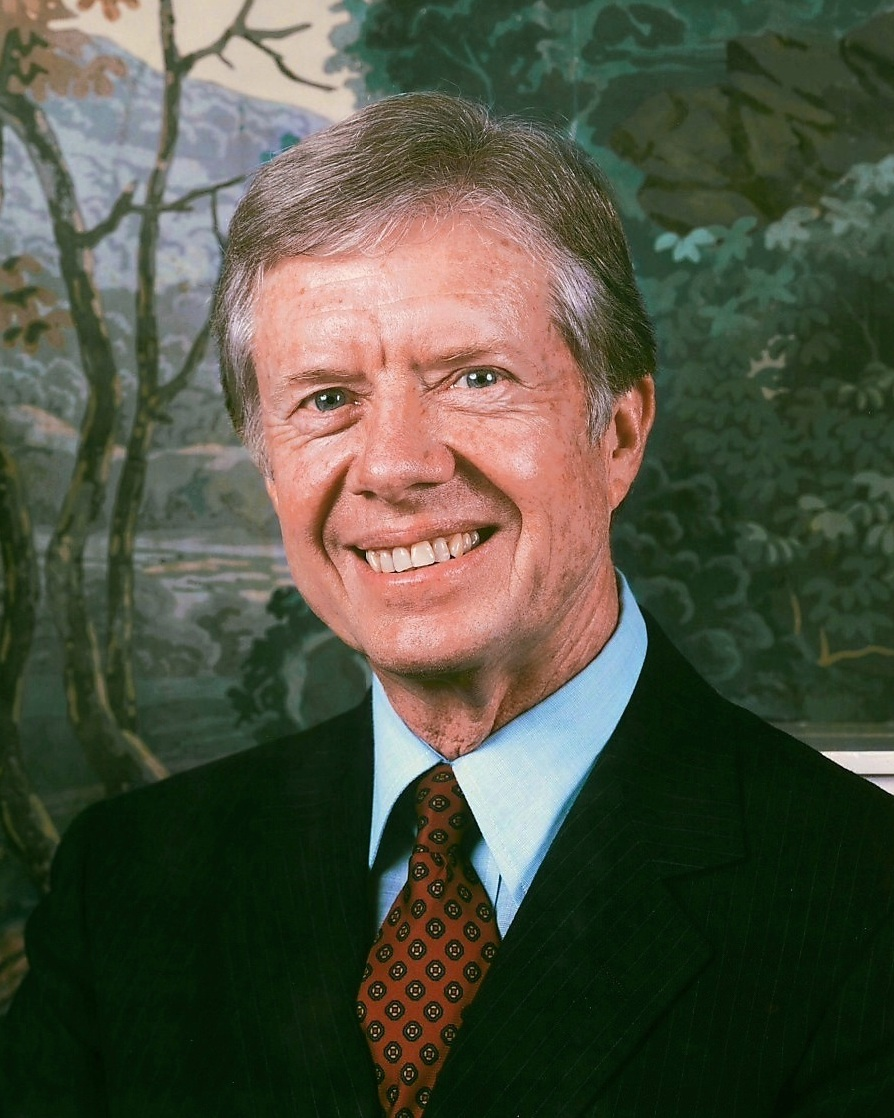
Nominee	Ronald Reagan	Jimmy Carter
Party	Republican	Democratic
Home state	California	Georgia
Running mate	George H. W. Bush	Walter Mondale
Electoral vote	8	0
Popular vote	695,570	402,026
Percentage	60.50%	34.97%
County results
Reagan
40–50%
50–60%
60–70%
70–80%
80–90%
Carter
40–50%
50–60%
60–70%
President before election
Jimmy Carter
Democratic
Elected President
Ronald Reagan
Republican

The 1980 United States presidential election in Oklahoma took place on November 4, 1980. All fifty states and The District of Columbia were part of the 1980 United States presidential election. State voters chose eight electors to the Electoral College, who voted for president and vice president.

Oklahoma was won by former California Governor Ronald Reagan (R) by a 25-point landslide. It is a reliably Republican state, and the last Democratic presidential candidate to carry the state was Lyndon Johnson in 1964.

== Results ==
Electoral results
Presidential candidate	Party	Home state	Popular vote		Electoral vote	Running mate		
Presidential candidate	Party	Home state	Count	Percentage	Electoral vote	Vice-presidential candidate	Home state	Electoral vote
Ronald Reagan	Republican	California	695,570	60.50%	8	George H. W. Bush	Connecticut	8
Jimmy Carter (incumbent)	Democratic	Georgia	402,026	34.97%	0	Walter Mondale (incumbent)	Minnesota	0
John B. Anderson	Independent	Illinois	38,284	3.33%	0	Patrick Lucey	Wisconsin	0
Ed Clark	Libertarian	California	13,828	1.20%	0	David Koch	New York	0
Total			1,149,708	100%	8			8
Needed to win					270			270

=== Results by county ===
County	Ronald Reagan Republican		Jimmy Carter Democratic		John B. Anderson Independent		Ed Clark Libertarian		Margin		Total
County	#	%	#	%	#	%	#	%	#	%	Total
Adair	3,429	54.08%	2,761	43.54%	107	1.69%	44	0.69%	668	10.54%	6,341
Alfalfa	2,628	72.16%	899	24.68%	86	2.36%	29	0.80%	1,729	47.48%	3,642
Atoka	1,613	38.26%	2,505	59.42%	66	1.57%	32	0.76%	-892	-21.16%	4,216
Beaver	2,430	75.51%	696	21.63%	58	1.80%	34	1.06%	1,734	53.88%	3,218
Beckham	3,637	51.13%	3,298	46.37%	123	1.73%	55	0.77%	339	4.76%	7,113
Blaine	3,708	70.44%	1,399	26.58%	103	1.96%	54	1.03%	2,309	43.86%	5,264
Bryan	3,980	37.61%	6,410	60.57%	129	1.22%	63	0.60%	-2,430	-22.96%	10,582
Caddo	5,945	54.07%	4,695	42.70%	232	2.11%	123	1.12%	1,250	11.37%	10,995
Canadian	15,272	72.58%	4,889	23.24%	642	3.05%	238	1.13%	10,383	49.34%	21,041
Carter	9,262	57.34%	6,509	40.29%	258	1.60%	125	0.77%	2,753	17.05%	16,154
Cherokee	5,594	49.47%	5,215	46.12%	362	3.20%	137	1.21%	379	3.35%	11,308
Choctaw	2,394	39.84%	3,507	58.36%	73	1.21%	35	0.58%	-1,113	-18.52%	6,009
Cimarron	1,404	77.10%	373	20.48%	23	1.26%	21	1.15%	1,031	56.62%	1,821
Cleveland	31,178	61.86%	14,536	28.84%	3,910	7.76%	777	1.54%	16,642	33.02%	50,401
Coal	926	38.09%	1,442	59.32%	47	1.93%	16	0.66%	-516	-21.23%	2,431
Comanche	16,609	59.51%	9,972	35.73%	1,000	3.58%	329	1.18%	6,637	23.78%	27,910
Cotton	1,702	53.09%	1,410	43.98%	63	1.97%	31	0.97%	292	9.11%	3,206
Craig	2,956	49.66%	2,801	47.06%	156	2.62%	39	0.66%	155	2.60%	5,952
Creek	11,749	59.55%	7,339	37.20%	460	2.33%	181	0.92%	4,410	22.35%	19,729
Custer	6,469	65.65%	3,008	30.53%	290	2.94%	87	0.88%	3,461	35.12%	9,854
Delaware	5,302	54.00%	4,244	43.22%	177	1.80%	96	0.98%	1,058	10.78%	9,819
Dewey	1,943	67.56%	826	28.72%	70	2.43%	37	1.29%	1,117	38.84%	2,876
Ellis	1,908	74.82%	561	22.00%	54	2.12%	27	1.06%	1,347	52.82%	2,550
Garfield	17,989	72.45%	5,718	23.03%	846	3.41%	275	1.11%	12,271	49.42%	24,828
Garvin	5,520	50.83%	5,033	46.34%	210	1.93%	97	0.89%	487	4.49%	10,860
Grady	8,131	58.20%	5,330	38.15%	351	2.51%	159	1.14%	2,801	20.05%	13,971
Grant	2,411	69.44%	927	26.70%	84	2.42%	50	1.44%	1,484	42.74%	3,472
Greer	1,535	49.53%	1,492	48.14%	48	1.55%	24	0.77%	43	1.39%	3,099
Harmon	676	40.48%	961	57.54%	21	1.26%	12	0.72%	-285	-17.06%	1,670
Harper	1,652	74.08%	517	23.18%	40	1.79%	21	0.94%	1,135	50.90%	2,230
Haskell	2,024	40.39%	2,874	57.35%	65	1.30%	48	0.96%	-850	-16.96%	5,011
Hughes	2,170	39.35%	3,211	58.22%	85	1.54%	49	0.89%	-1,041	-18.87%	5,515
Jackson	4,327	50.58%	4,031	47.12%	144	1.68%	52	0.61%	296	3.46%	8,554
Jefferson	1,440	43.22%	1,812	54.38%	55	1.65%	25	0.75%	-372	-11.16%	3,332
Johnston	1,701	44.10%	2,066	53.56%	57	1.48%	33	0.86%	-365	-9.46%	3,857
Kay	15,004	67.17%	6,449	28.87%	665	2.98%	219	0.98%	8,555	38.30%	22,337
Kingfisher	4,962	77.31%	1,282	19.98%	122	1.90%	52	0.81%	3,680	57.33%	6,418
Kiowa	2,636	51.44%	2,372	46.29%	88	1.72%	28	0.55%	264	5.15%	5,124
Latimer	1,737	43.80%	2,105	53.08%	71	1.79%	53	1.34%	-368	-9.28%	3,966
LeFlore	6,807	49.47%	6,668	48.46%	174	1.26%	110	0.80%	139	1.01%	13,759
Lincoln	6,064	63.27%	3,231	33.71%	204	2.13%	86	0.90%	2,833	29.56%	9,585
Logan	6,311	63.16%	3,246	32.49%	259	2.59%	176	1.76%	3,065	30.67%	9,992
Love	1,449	47.12%	1,578	51.32%	31	1.01%	17	0.55%	-129	-4.20%	3,075
McClain	4,284	56.87%	2,990	39.69%	185	2.46%	74	0.98%	1,294	17.18%	7,533
McCurtain	5,189	45.63%	5,953	52.35%	149	1.31%	81	0.71%	-764	-6.72%	11,372
McIntosh	2,925	43.25%	3,654	54.03%	118	1.74%	66	0.98%	-729	-10.78%	6,763
Major	3,059	81.81%	584	15.62%	62	1.66%	34	0.91%	2,475	66.19%	3,739
Marshall	1,961	46.75%	2,157	51.42%	52	1.24%	25	0.60%	-196	-4.67%	4,195
Mayes	6,633	53.67%	5,344	43.24%	256	2.07%	125	1.01%	1,289	10.43%	12,358
Murray	2,494	49.22%	2,384	47.05%	126	2.49%	63	1.24%	110	2.17%	5,067
Muskogee	11,511	44.76%	13,341	51.88%	633	2.46%	230	0.89%	-1,830	-7.12%	25,715
Noble	3,663	69.90%	1,398	26.68%	124	2.37%	55	1.05%	2,265	43.22%	5,240
Nowata	2,640	59.06%	1,694	37.90%	75	1.68%	61	1.36%	946	21.16%	4,470
Okfuskee	2,126	48.31%	2,177	49.47%	58	1.32%	40	0.91%	-51	-1.16%	4,401
Oklahoma	139,538	66.05%	58,765	27.81%	9,190	4.35%	3,780	1.79%	80,773	38.24%	211,273
Okmulgee	6,652	46.57%	7,236	50.65%	286	2.00%	111	0.78%	-584	-4.08%	14,285
Osage	8,044	56.46%	5,687	39.92%	363	2.55%	152	1.07%	2,357	16.54%	14,246
Ottawa	6,362	49.25%	6,143	47.55%	317	2.45%	97	0.75%	219	1.70%	12,919
Pawnee	3,902	63.44%	2,020	32.84%	161	2.62%	68	1.11%	1,882	30.60%	6,151
Payne	15,955	62.10%	7,466	29.06%	1,812	7.05%	458	1.78%	8,489	33.04%	25,691
Pittsburg	7,062	44.54%	8,292	52.29%	339	2.14%	164	1.03%	-1,230	-7.75%	15,857
Pontotoc	6,232	49.34%	5,942	47.04%	335	2.65%	122	0.97%	290	2.30%	12,631
Pottawatomie	12,466	57.05%	8,526	39.02%	625	2.86%	233	1.07%	3,940	18.03%	21,850
Pushmataha	1,989	41.65%	2,666	55.83%	65	1.36%	55	1.15%	-677	-14.18%	4,775
Roger Mills	1,221	56.24%	877	40.40%	50	2.30%	23	1.06%	344	15.84%	2,171
Rogers	11,581	62.12%	6,399	34.33%	461	2.47%	201	1.08%	5,182	27.79%	18,642
Seminole	5,067	49.95%	4,726	46.58%	224	2.21%	128	1.26%	341	3.37%	10,145
Sequoyah	5,987	53.24%	4,983	44.31%	178	1.58%	98	0.87%	1,004	8.93%	11,246
Stephens	10,199	57.13%	7,191	40.28%	310	1.74%	152	0.85%	3,008	16.85%	17,852
Texas	5,503	77.52%	1,451	20.44%	93	1.31%	52	0.73%	4,052	57.08%	7,099
Tillman	2,450	52.27%	2,144	45.74%	69	1.47%	24	0.51%	306	6.53%	4,687
Tulsa	124,643	66.25%	53,438	28.40%	7,802	4.15%	2,265	1.20%	71,205	37.85%	188,148
Wagoner	8,969	60.90%	5,235	35.55%	369	2.51%	154	1.05%	3,734	25.35%	14,727
Washington	16,563	70.47%	5,854	24.91%	851	3.62%	235	1.00%	10,709	45.56%	23,503
Washita	3,206	59.67%	2,044	38.04%	71	1.32%	52	0.97%	1,162	21.63%	5,373
Woods	3,592	68.97%	1,364	26.19%	191	3.67%	61	1.17%	2,228	42.78%	5,208
Woodward	5,318	72.96%	1,703	23.36%	175	2.40%	93	1.28%	3,615	49.60%	7,289
Totals	695,570	60.50%	402,026	34.97%	38,284	3.33%	13,828	1.20%	293,544	25.53%	1,149,708

==== Counties that flipped from Democratic to Republican ====
- Adair
- Beckham
- Caddo
- Cherokee
- Carter
- Cimarron
- Cotton
- Craig
- Creek
- Delaware
- Dewey
- Garvin
- Grady
- Grant
- Greer
- Jackson
- Kiowa
- LeFlore
- Lincoln
- Logan
- McClain
- Mayes
- Murray
- Nowata
- Osage
- Ottawa
- Pontotoc
- Pottawatomie
- Roger Mills
- Rogers
- Seminole
- Sequoyah
- Stephens
- Tillman
- Wagoner
- Washita

== Slates of Electors ==
Democrat: Tobie Branch, Joe Johnson, Marzee Douglas, Sweet Pea Abernathy, Linnie Clayton Spann, Al Tesio, Loretta Jackson, Bert Russell

Republican: Robert Scott Petty, Lanny Joe Reed, Frank Douglas Stickney Sr, Ronald Neal Allen, Thomas J. Harris, Kenneth Floyd Musick, Grace Ward Boulton, Paul E. Thornbrugh

Libertarian: Mary Laurent, Fred Bross, Loren Baker, Roger Phares, Anatolly Arutunoff, Thomas Winter, Paul Woodard, Charles Burris

Independent: Aileen E. Ginther, Juanita L. Learned, Arlie J. Nixon, Linda M. Remer, James Heinicke, John Lowe, Laura Shepperd, John W. Reskovac Sr

== See also ==
- United States presidential elections in Oklahoma
- Presidency of Ronald Reagan
