= Bob Marrs =

American saddle maker (1927–2022)

- Born: 25 February 1927; Delaware, Oklahoma
- Died: February 22, 2022 (aged 94)
- Known for: Saddle making, cowboy culture
- Spouse: Betty Marrs
- Parents: Ed Marrs (father); Jenny Kirk Marrs (mother)

Bob Marrs (February 25, 1927 – February 22, 2022) was an American saddle maker and the owner of Bob Marrs Stockman's Saddle Shop.

He was the recipient of the Western Heritage Honoree at the Amarillo Tri-State Fair and two Master Saddle Maker Emeritus Awards from the Saddle Makers Association in 2020 and 2019, respectively. Bob also received the Life Time Achievement, Don King Saddle Making Award from the Will Rogers Academy of Western Art in 2006, and the Chester A. Reynolds Great Western Award from the National Cowboy & Western Heritage Museum in 2001.

== Early life ==
Marrs was born on February 25, 1927, near Delaware, Oklahoma. He left school at the age of 16 and then worked on ranches as a cowboy in Oklahoma, Texas, California, Arizona, and New Mexico during the decades of 1940s and 1950s.

At the Waggoner Ranch in Texas, Marrs used to work during the day and study at night, applying the G.I. Bill at a leather-working school in Vernon, Texas. He learned leather craftsmanship, hand-tool carving, and leather refining products in the institute.

== Career ==
=== Army ===
Before starting his career as a saddle maker, Marrs served in the U.S Army during the last days of World War II in 1945. He first went to Fort Riley, Kansas, for recruitment and then to receive basic infantry training at Camp Roberts, California. Marrs was sent to Italy after the war ended and served for a year. After that, he was discharged from the military services in January 1947.

=== Saddle Making ===
Following the advice of a friend and mentor, Bob initiated his career as a saddle maker. His friend advised him to learn a livelihood and settle down with his wife, Betty, to start a family. After completing leather-working school classes from a saddle shop in Vernon, Texas, Marrs moved with his family to several locations, including Gunnison, Colorado, Woodward, Oklahoma, Fort Worth, and Lubbock, Texas, and worked for different saddle makers.

In 1949, Marrs created his first saddle at a western store in Gunnison, Colorado. He relocated to Amarillo with his wife, Betty, and joined Stockman's Boot and Saddle Shop the following year.

On August 2, 1954, Marrs acquired Stockman's Saddle Shop in Amarillo, Texas, and rebranded it as Bob Marrs Stockman's Saddle Shop. Betty ran the front of the store, greeted customers, and managed all sales and bookkeeping aspects of the business. She, too, was a self-taught entrepreneur. Marrs worked with a horse trainer to develop and engineer customized cutting horse saddles. He was invited to a museum in Indianapolis, Indiana, to display saddle-making demonstrations in August 1989.

After running the Bob Marrs Stockman's Saddle Shop for 38 years, Marrs and his wife sold the saddle shop to seek semi-retirement in 1992. Marrs continued to craft custom saddles in his garage, which he used as a workshop and museum.

Marrs' prominent saddle-making techniques, engineering, and style included his name stamped twice outside the saddle – behind the seat and below the saddle horn. This style contributed to his recognition as a saddle maker/craftsman and brand, along with his hand-carved tooling of the signature poinsettia flower, his wedding anniversary rose. He applied his dimensional hand-tooling to other media creating his unique typography in signage for a bit-and-spur show in 1992 and designing bandanas with his themes and signature in 2021.

== Awards ==
- Western Heritage Honoree at the Amarillo (Texas) Tri-State Fair in 2020
- Master Saddle Maker Emeritus Award from the American Saddle Makers Association in 2019
- Life Time Achievement, Don King Saddle Making Award from the Will Rogers Academy of Western Art in Fort Worth, Texas, in 2006
- Chester A. Reynolds Great Western Award from the National Cowboy & Western Heritage Museum in Oklahoma City, Oklahoma, in 2001
- Trappings of Texas Western Heritage Award from Big Bend Museum in Alpine, Texas, in 2000
- Will Rogers Range Riders Western Heritage Award in Amarillo, Texas, in 1999
- The Will Rogers Academy of Western Art Saddle Maker of the Year in Fort Worth, Texas, in 1996

== Philanthropy ==
A collection of Marrs' work and artifacts resides at the Panhandle-Plains Historical Museum (PPHM) in Canyon, Texas. A small collection of Marrs artifacts was donated to the Haley Memorial Library and History Center in Midland, Texas. Marrs also volunteered to help veterans learn to craft hand-made leather belts at the Veterans Affairs Healthcare System Nursing Center.

== Personal life ==
Marrs was born near Delaware, Oklahoma, to Ed Marrs and Jenny Kirk Marrs. He was brought up working with his father at his family farm.

In 1947, he married Betty Mae Lucas, who was also from Oklahoma. The couple had two daughters (Kathy and Debby) and three granddaughters (Shelly, Angela and Amy) and were married for seventy-five years. Both husband and wife were members of Comanche Trail Church of Christ in Amarillo, Texas.

== Death and legacy ==
Marrs died on February 23, 2022, and was buried in Memorial Park Cemetery in Amarillo, Texas. Amy Sheets, a fashion designer and granddaughter of Marrs, founded Marrs Makers in 2019 to honor her grandfather's career. After Marrs' death, Amy Sheets initiated preserving and amplifying Marrs' works and contributions through her organization. Betty Marrs died on January 30, 2025 at 97 years old. She is buried next to Bob.
