= 1908 United States presidential election in Oklahoma =

- November 3, 1908
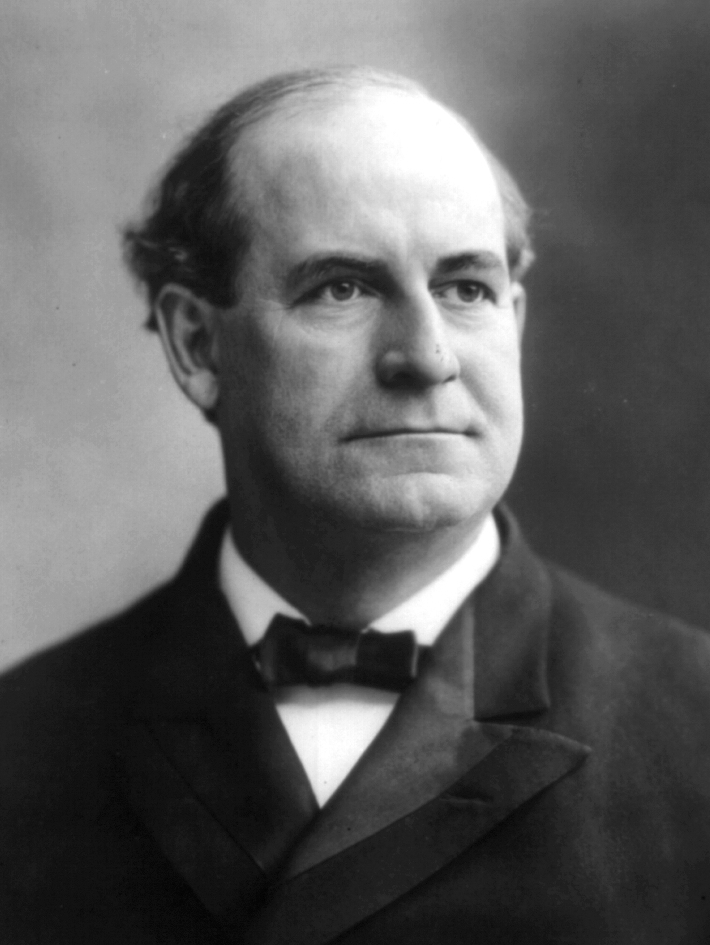

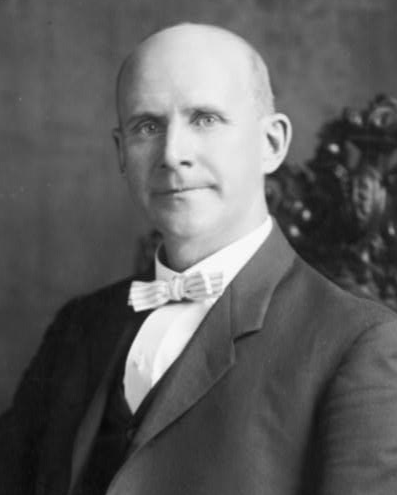
Nominee	William Jennings Bryan	William Howard Taft	Eugene V. Debs
Party	Democratic	Republican	Socialist
Home state	Nebraska	Ohio	Indiana
Running mate	John W. Kern	James S. Sherman	Ben Hanford
Electoral vote	7	0	0
Popular vote	122,363	110,474	21,755
Percentage	47.93%	43.27%	8.52%
County results
Bryan
40–50%
50–60%
60–70%
Taft
40–50%
50–60%
60–70%
President before election
Theodore Roosevelt
Republican
Elected President
William Howard Taft
Republican

The 1908 United States presidential election in Oklahoma took place on November 3, 1908. All 46 states were part of the 1908 United States presidential election. Voters chose seven electors to the Electoral College, who voted for president and vice president. This was the first presidential election Oklahoma participated in, as it had become the 46th state on November 16, 1907.

Oklahoma was won by the Democratic nominees, former U.S. Representative William Jennings Bryan and his running mate John W. Kern of Indiana. They defeated the Republican nominees, Secretary of War William Howard Taft of Ohio and his running mate James S. Sherman of New York. Bryan won the state by a narrow margin of 4.66%, establishing Oklahoma as a Democratic-leaning state, a position it would hold for several decades.

Prior to 1952, it consistently voted Democratic in presidential elections outside of the Republican landslides in 1920 and 1928. Only Lyndon B. Johnson in his 1964 landslide has carried the state for Democrats since 1952. This is one of two times that the state voted for a losing Democrat, along with 1924. This was one of only two elections in which Oklahoma County, home to Oklahoma City, voted for a candidate that lost the state, along with 1920.

Eugene V. Debs, the Socialist candidate, won 8.52% of the vote, demonstrating the strength of the Socialist movement in Oklahoma at this point in the state's history. Debs would go on to improve this performance in 1912, winning around twice as much of the percentage of the vote in Oklahoma.

== Results ==
1908 United States presidential election in Oklahoma
Party	Candidate	Votes	Percentage	Electoral votes
Democratic	William Jennings Bryan	122,363	47.93%	7
Republican	William Howard Taft	110,474	43.27%	0
Socialist	Eugene V. Debs	21,755	8.52%	0
Populist	Thomas E. Watson	434	0.17%	0
Independence	Thomas L. Hisgen	274	0.11%	0
Totals		255,300	100.0%	7

=== Results by county ===
County	William Jennings Bryan Democratic		William Howard Taft Republican		Eugene V. Debs Socialist		Various candidates Other parties		Margin		Total votes cast
County	#	%	#	%	#	%	#	%	#	%	Total votes cast
Adair	825	50.55%	780	47.79%	26	1.59%	1	0.06%	45	2.76%	1,632
Alfalfa	1,459	43.13%	1,738	51.37%	179	5.29%	7	0.21%	-279	-8.25%	3,383
Atoka	784	44.95%	757	43.41%	197	11.30%	6	0.34%	27	1.55%	1,744
Beaver	1,212	43.52%	1,362	48.90%	197	7.07%	14	0.50%	-150	-5.39%	2,785
Beckham	1,807	56.68%	866	27.16%	498	15.62%	17	0.53%	941	29.52%	3,188
Blaine	1,317	40.25%	1,598	48.84%	341	10.42%	16	0.49%	-281	-8.59%	3,272
Bryan	2,215	59.26%	1,044	27.93%	462	12.36%	17	0.45%	1,171	31.33%	3,738
Caddo	2,964	47.36%	2,860	45.69%	423	6.76%	12	0.19%	104	1.66%	6,259
Canadian	2,124	50.34%	1,931	45.77%	157	3.72%	7	0.17%	193	4.57%	4,219
Carter	2,181	53.46%	1,305	31.99%	587	14.39%	7	0.17%	876	21.47%	4,080
Cherokee	913	45.65%	1,039	51.95%	47	2.35%	1	0.05%	-126	-6.30%	2,000
Choctaw	1,038	46.44%	878	39.28%	312	13.96%	7	0.31%	160	7.16%	2,235
Cimarron	449	52.33%	371	43.24%	38	4.43%	0	0.00%	78	9.09%	858
Cleveland	1,437	47.80%	1,092	36.33%	414	13.77%	63	2.10%	345	11.48%	3,006
Coal	906	42.02%	722	33.49%	524	24.30%	4	0.19%	184	8.53%	2,156
Comanche	3,481	54.88%	2,437	38.42%	411	6.48%	14	0.22%	1,044	16.46%	6,343
Craig	1,578	53.75%	1,296	44.14%	56	1.91%	6	0.20%	282	9.60%	2,936
Creek	1,413	40.19%	1,761	50.09%	335	9.53%	7	0.20%	-348	-9.90%	3,516
Custer	1,721	47.18%	1,579	43.28%	333	9.13%	15	0.41%	142	3.89%	3,648
Delaware	974	58.92%	625	37.81%	52	3.15%	2	0.12%	349	21.11%	1,653
Dewey	1,075	38.67%	1,210	43.53%	486	17.48%	9	0.32%	-135	-4.86%	2,780
Ellis	1,260	43.84%	1,379	47.98%	224	7.79%	11	0.38%	-119	-4.14%	2,874
Garfield	2,618	45.09%	2,924	50.36%	254	4.37%	10	0.17%	-306	-5.27%	5,806
Garvin	2,390	59.13%	1,290	31.91%	356	8.81%	6	0.15%	1,100	27.21%	4,042
Grady	2,826	61.38%	1,491	32.38%	258	5.60%	29	0.63%	1,335	29.00%	4,604
Grant	1,866	49.35%	1,796	47.50%	105	2.78%	14	0.37%	70	1.85%	3,781
Greer	2,149	63.98%	708	21.08%	472	14.05%	30	0.89%	1,441	42.90%	3,359
Harper	746	40.79%	876	47.90%	201	10.99%	6	0.33%	-130	-7.11%	1,829
Haskell	1,401	48.21%	1,139	39.19%	363	12.49%	3	0.10%	262	9.02%	2,906
Hughes	1,649	47.21%	1,459	41.77%	380	10.88%	5	0.14%	190	5.44%	3,493
Jackson	1,897	68.31%	627	22.58%	230	8.28%	23	0.83%	1,270	45.73%	2,777
Jefferson	1,435	61.91%	604	26.06%	270	11.65%	9	0.39%	831	35.85%	2,318
Johnston	1,274	49.57%	693	26.96%	602	23.42%	1	0.04%	581	22.61%	2,570
Kay	2,511	46.41%	2,754	50.91%	138	2.55%	7	0.13%	-243	-4.49%	5,410
Kingfisher	1,540	39.68%	2,106	54.26%	226	5.82%	9	0.23%	-566	-14.58%	3,881
Kiowa	2,354	55.19%	1,591	37.30%	300	7.03%	20	0.47%	763	17.89%	4,265
Latimer	726	47.08%	616	39.95%	197	12.78%	3	0.19%	110	7.13%	1,542
Le Flore	1,872	48.22%	1,771	45.62%	230	5.92%	9	0.23%	101	2.60%	3,882
Lincoln	3,030	42.76%	3,503	49.44%	534	7.54%	19	0.27%	-473	-6.68%	7,086
Logan	2,183	35.38%	3,768	61.07%	203	3.29%	16	0.26%	-1,585	-25.69%	6,170
Love	835	55.63%	413	27.51%	253	16.86%	0	0.00%	422	28.11%	1,501
Major	877	31.30%	1,446	51.61%	463	16.52%	16	0.57%	-569	-20.31%	2,802
Marshall	842	50.75%	406	24.47%	405	24.41%	6	0.36%	436	26.28%	1,659
Mayes	1,186	52.59%	1,021	45.28%	44	1.95%	4	0.18%	165	7.32%	2,255
McClain	1,234	51.83%	780	32.76%	363	15.25%	4	0.17%	454	19.07%	2,381
McCurtain	565	46.97%	482	40.07%	148	12.30%	8	0.67%	83	6.90%	1,203
McIntosh	1,236	41.34%	1,606	53.71%	141	4.72%	7	0.23%	-370	-12.37%	2,990
Murray	1,111	56.28%	574	29.08%	280	14.18%	9	0.46%	537	27.20%	1,974
Muskogee	2,793	42.57%	3,592	54.75%	168	2.56%	8	0.12%	-799	-12.18%	6,561
Noble	1,364	45.94%	1,476	49.71%	125	4.21%	4	0.13%	-112	-3.77%	2,969
Nowata	909	45.63%	1,020	51.20%	61	3.06%	2	0.10%	-111	-5.57%	1,992
Okfuskee	872	33.89%	1,297	50.41%	402	15.62%	2	0.08%	-425	-16.52%	2,573
Oklahoma	4,876	45.17%	5,401	50.03%	493	4.57%	25	0.23%	-525	-4.86%	10,795
Okmulgee	1,103	39.39%	1,400	50.00%	295	10.54%	2	0.07%	-297	-10.61%	2,800
Osage	1,584	48.38%	1,528	46.67%	159	4.86%	3	0.09%	56	1.71%	3,274
Ottawa	1,297	50.55%	1,174	45.75%	93	3.62%	2	0.08%	123	4.79%	2,566
Pawnee	1,500	44.66%	1,556	46.32%	291	8.66%	12	0.36%	-56	-1.67%	3,359
Payne	1,980	42.81%	2,244	48.52%	390	8.43%	11	0.24%	-264	-5.71%	4,625
Pittsburg	2,891	46.14%	2,735	43.65%	629	10.04%	11	0.18%	156	2.49%	6,266
Pontotoc	1,841	56.09%	860	26.20%	578	17.61%	3	0.09%	981	29.89%	3,282
Pottawatomie	3,551	52.80%	2,609	38.79%	555	8.25%	11	0.16%	942	14.01%	6,726
Pushmataha	625	50.65%	484	39.22%	125	10.13%	0	0.00%	141	11.43%	1,234
Roger Mills	1,168	48.32%	839	34.71%	403	16.67%	7	0.29%	329	13.61%	2,417
Rogers	1,599	55.64%	1,134	39.46%	131	4.56%	10	0.35%	465	16.18%	2,874
Seminole	945	36.78%	1,168	45.47%	452	17.59%	4	0.16%	-223	-8.68%	2,569
Sequoyah	1,648	43.19%	2,037	53.38%	131	3.43%	0	0.00%	-389	-10.19%	3,816
Stephens	1,761	56.37%	725	23.21%	629	20.13%	9	0.29%	1,036	33.16%	3,124
Texas	1,470	48.48%	1,315	43.37%	239	7.88%	8	0.26%	155	5.11%	3,032
Tillman	1,661	66.02%	732	29.09%	109	4.33%	14	0.56%	929	36.92%	2,516
Tulsa	2,292	49.08%	2,150	46.04%	226	4.84%	2	0.04%	142	3.04%	4,670
Wagoner	1,143	33.38%	2,107	61.54%	167	4.88%	7	0.20%	-964	-28.15%	3,424
Washington	1,409	45.94%	1,528	49.82%	123	4.01%	7	0.23%	-119	-3.88%	3,067
Washita	1,867	54.82%	1,118	32.82%	409	12.01%	12	0.35%	749	21.99%	3,406
Woods	1,420	43.43%	1,557	47.61%	286	8.75%	7	0.21%	-137	-4.19%	3,270
Woodward	1,308	39.61%	1,614	48.88%	371	11.24%	9	0.27%	-306	-9.27%	3,302
Totals	122,363	47.93%	110,474	43.27%	21,755	8.52%	708	0.28%	11,889	4.66%	255,300

== See also ==
- United States presidential elections in Oklahoma
