= 1924 United States presidential election in Oklahoma =

- November 4, 1924

Nominee	John W. Davis	Calvin Coolidge	Robert M. La Follette
Party	Democratic	Republican	Farmer–Labor
Alliance			Progressive
Home state	West Virginia	Massachusetts	Wisconsin
Running mate	Charles W. Bryan	Charles G. Dawes	Burton K. Wheeler
Electoral vote	10	0	0
Popular vote	255,798	226,242	46,375
Percentage	48.41%	42.82%	8.78%
County results
Davis
40–50%
50–60%
60–70%
70–80%
Coolidge
40–50%
50–60%
President before election
Calvin Coolidge
Republican
Elected President
Calvin Coolidge
Republican

The 1924 United States presidential election in Oklahoma took place on November 4, 1924, as part of the 1924 United States presidential election which was held throughout all contemporary forty-eight states. Voters chose ten representatives, or electors to the Electoral College, who voted for president and vice president.

In its early years, Oklahoma was a “Solid South” state whose founding fathers like "Alfalfa Bill" Murray and Charles N. Haskell had disfranchised most of its black population via literacy tests and grandfather clauses, the latter of which would be declared unconstitutional in Guinn v. United States. In 1920 this “Solid South” state, nonetheless, joined the Republican landslide of Warren G. Harding, electing a GOP senator and five congressmen, but in 1922 the Democratic Party returned to their typical ascendancy as the state GOP became bitterly divided.

Also in the running was the Progressive Party nominee, Senator Robert M. La Follette of Wisconsin and his running mate Senator Burton K. Wheeler of Montana, though they ran under the Farmer–Labor Party label in Oklahoma. Despite problems in the state's agricultural sector, La Follette did not have the appeal in Oklahoma he had in more northerly areas of the Plains. Isolationism was weaker in this heavily Southern, Protestant state and Bryan-era pietist Democratic support struck a different cultural vein from La Follette's largely Catholic and Lutheran backers. Unlike the Bryanites, La Follette's base strongly opposed the Ku Klux Klan, which dominated politics in Oklahoma at the time, and was focused on farm cooperatives.

Oklahoma was won by Democratic nominee, Ambassador John W. Davis of West Virginia, over Republican nominee, incumbent President Calvin Coolidge of Massachusetts. Davis ran with Governor Charles W. Bryan of Nebraska, while Coolidge ran with former Budget Director Charles G. Dawes of Illinois. Davis won the state by a margin of 5.59 percentage points. This made Oklahoma the only state outside the former Confederacy to vote for him. This is also the last time Oklahoma would vote for a losing Democratic candidate, and just one of two times (the other being its first election in 1908) overall.

== Results ==
General Election Results
Party	Pledged to	Elector	Votes
Democratic Party	John W. Davis	H. D. Henry	255,798
Democratic Party	John W. Davis	A. L. Kates	254,953
Democratic Party	John W. Davis	J. A. Alderson	254,708
Democratic Party	John W. Davis	J. P. Roetzel	254,663
Democratic Party	John W. Davis	C. W. Miller	254,531
Democratic Party	John W. Davis	William T. Bowling	254,342
Democratic Party	John W. Davis	A. G. C. Bierer	254,167
Democratic Party	John W. Davis	Henry R. Vance	254,142
Democratic Party	John W. Davis	Kirby Fitzpatrick	254,012
Democratic Party	John W. Davis	H. P. Hosey	253,933
Republican Party	Calvin Coolidge	Joe C. Fox	226,242
Republican Party	Calvin Coolidge	Charles Wilson	226,216
Republican Party	Calvin Coolidge	W. B. Johnson	226,182
Republican Party	Calvin Coolidge	A. E. Landon	225,755
Republican Party	Calvin Coolidge	George F. Langley	225,395
Republican Party	Calvin Coolidge	Florence Lindley	225,029
Republican Party	Calvin Coolidge	W. P. Fleeman	224,998
Republican Party	Calvin Coolidge	Estelle Chisholm Ward	224,814
Republican Party	Calvin Coolidge	A. B. Honeycutt	224,496
Republican Party	Calvin Coolidge	Irene L. Sams	224,417
Farmer–Labor Party	Robert M. La Follette Sr.	J. A. Showen	41,141
Farmer–Labor Party	Robert M. La Follette Sr.	J. L. Gordon	41,057
Farmer–Labor Party	Robert M. La Follette Sr.	W. S. Beesley	41,048
Farmer–Labor Party	Robert M. La Follette Sr.	G. E. Metts	41,021
Farmer–Labor Party	Robert M. La Follette Sr.	C. D. Webster	41,009
Farmer–Labor Party	Robert M. La Follette Sr.	H. W. Worthington	40,944
Farmer–Labor Party	Robert M. La Follette Sr.	L. Euneau	40,897
Farmer–Labor Party	Robert M. La Follette Sr.	Clara Stofer	40,831
Farmer–Labor Party	Robert M. La Follette Sr.	W. W. Whalen	40,786
Farmer–Labor Party	Robert M. La Follette Sr.	Freda Hogan	40,422
Socialist Party	Robert M. La Follette Sr.	Wm. Chambers	5,234
Socialist Party	Robert M. La Follette Sr.	Leonard Johnson	4,982
Socialist Party	Robert M. La Follette Sr.	Mary Blackwell	4,928
Socialist Party	Robert M. La Follette Sr.	Minnie Brannun	4,927
Socialist Party	Robert M. La Follette Sr.	J. A. Hart	4,905
Socialist Party	Robert M. La Follette Sr.	E. H. H. Gates	4,903
Socialist Party	Robert M. La Follette Sr.	Rose Ella Gates	4,890
Socialist Party	Robert M. La Follette Sr.	S. C. Brannun	4,883
Socialist Party	Robert M. La Follette Sr.	Myrtle Blackwell	4,839
Socialist Party	Robert M. La Follette Sr.	K. Feige	4,752
Votes cast (Note: Based on totals for highest elector on each ticket)			528,415

=== Results by county ===
County	John William Davis Democratic		John Calvin Coolidge Republican		Robert M. La Follette Sr. Farmer–Labor		Margin		Total votes cast
County	#	%	#	%	#	%	#	%	Total votes cast
Adair	1,942	43.27%	2,317	51.63%	229	5.10%	-375	-8.36%	4,488
Alfalfa	1,558	30.07%	2,967	57.27%	656	12.66%	-1,409	-27.20%	5,181
Atoka	2,204	54.30%	1,130	27.84%	725	17.86%	1,074	26.46%	4,059
Beaver	1,195	37.73%	1,565	49.42%	407	12.85%	-370	-11.68%	3,167
Beckham	2,496	56.90%	1,357	30.93%	534	12.17%	1,139	25.96%	4,387
Blaine	1,488	32.02%	2,255	48.53%	904	19.45%	-767	-16.51%	4,647
Bryan	4,593	64.95%	1,780	25.17%	699	9.88%	2,813	39.78%	7,072
Caddo	4,211	44.19%	4,388	46.04%	931	9.77%	-177	-1.86%	9,530
Canadian	3,065	41.44%	3,070	41.50%	1,262	17.06%	-5	-0.07%	7,397
Carter	7,134	65.68%	3,164	29.13%	564	5.19%	3,970	36.55%	10,862
Cherokee	2,454	46.65%	2,622	49.84%	185	3.52%	-168	-3.19%	5,261
Choctaw	2,528	47.90%	2,013	38.14%	737	13.96%	515	9.76%	5,278
Cimarron	672	47.26%	586	41.21%	164	11.53%	86	6.05%	1,422
Cleveland	2,841	56.73%	1,672	33.39%	495	9.88%	1,169	23.34%	5,008
Coal	1,772	55.74%	800	25.17%	607	19.09%	972	30.58%	3,179
Comanche	3,523	47.30%	3,084	41.41%	841	11.29%	439	5.89%	7,448
Cotton	1,825	49.26%	1,581	42.67%	299	8.07%	244	6.59%	3,705
Craig	3,096	53.51%	2,519	43.54%	171	2.96%	577	9.97%	5,786
Creek	7,969	44.99%	8,894	50.21%	851	4.80%	-925	-5.22%	17,714
Custer	2,473	43.93%	2,409	42.80%	747	13.27%	64	1.14%	5,629
Delaware	1,729	48.64%	1,563	43.97%	263	7.40%	166	4.67%	3,555
Dewey	1,126	32.51%	1,539	44.43%	799	23.07%	-413	-11.92%	3,464
Ellis	879	28.56%	1,499	48.70%	700	22.74%	-620	-20.14%	3,078
Garfield	3,791	28.36%	7,524	56.28%	2,054	15.36%	-3,733	-27.92%	13,369
Garvin	4,758	68.63%	1,863	26.87%	312	4.50%	2,895	41.76%	6,933
Grady	5,091	59.29%	2,640	30.75%	855	9.96%	2,451	28.55%	8,586
Grant	1,990	36.77%	2,800	51.74%	622	11.49%	-810	-14.97%	5,412
Greer	1,982	70.13%	551	19.50%	293	10.37%	1,431	50.64%	2,826
Harmon	1,049	72.05%	339	23.28%	68	4.67%	710	48.76%	1,456
Harper	824	34.12%	1,226	50.77%	365	15.11%	-402	-16.65%	2,415
Haskell	2,480	51.50%	1,935	40.18%	401	8.33%	545	11.32%	4,816
Hughes	3,996	64.45%	1,994	32.16%	210	3.39%	2,002	32.29%	6,200
Jackson	2,342	61.57%	941	24.74%	521	13.70%	1,401	36.83%	3,804
Jefferson	2,441	64.87%	1,108	29.44%	214	5.69%	1,333	35.42%	3,763
Johnston	2,122	57.03%	923	24.81%	676	18.17%	1,199	32.22%	3,721
Kay	6,049	41.87%	7,392	51.16%	1,007	6.97%	-1,343	-9.30%	14,448
Kingfisher	1,644	32.27%	2,834	55.62%	617	12.11%	-1,190	-23.36%	5,095
Kiowa	2,635	54.29%	1,688	34.78%	531	10.94%	947	19.51%	4,854
Latimer	1,457	53.92%	971	35.94%	274	10.14%	486	17.99%	2,702
Le Flore	4,069	49.34%	3,326	40.33%	852	10.33%	743	9.01%	8,247
Lincoln	3,283	39.83%	4,220	51.20%	739	8.97%	-937	-11.37%	8,242
Logan	2,366	31.29%	4,445	58.78%	751	9.93%	-2,079	-27.49%	7,562
Love	1,713	62.79%	479	17.56%	536	19.65%	1,177 (Note: In this county where Coolidge ran third behind both Davis and La Follette, margin given is Davis vote minus La Follette vote and percentage margin Davis percentage minus La Follette percentage.)	43.15%	2,728
Major	649	21.32%	1,781	58.51%	614	20.17%	-1,132	-37.19%	3,044
Marshall	1,935	57.83%	866	25.88%	545	16.29%	1,069	31.95%	3,346
Mayes	2,246	45.95%	2,317	47.40%	325	6.65%	-71	-1.45%	4,888
McClain	2,519	62.80%	1,233	30.74%	259	6.46%	1,286	32.06%	4,011
McCurtain	3,279	63.24%	1,669	32.19%	237	4.57%	1,610	31.05%	5,185
McIntosh	2,723	60.58%	1,675	37.26%	97	2.16%	1,048	23.31%	4,495
Murray	2,083	69.09%	784	26.00%	148	4.91%	1,299	43.08%	3,015
Muskogee	6,895	50.34%	6,158	44.96%	644	4.70%	737	5.38%	13,697
Noble	1,927	36.77%	2,680	51.15%	633	12.08%	-753	-14.37%	5,240
Nowata	2,049	45.54%	2,296	51.03%	154	3.42%	-247	-5.49%	4,499
Okfuskee	2,654	61.03%	1,431	32.90%	264	6.07%	1,223	28.12%	4,349
Oklahoma	21,708	50.38%	17,504	40.63%	3,873	8.99%	4,204	9.76%	43,085
Okmulgee	5,927	46.17%	6,015	46.85%	896	6.98%	-88	-0.69%	12,838
Osage	7,070	49.78%	6,363	44.80%	769	5.41%	707	4.98%	14,202
Ottawa	4,522	43.58%	5,197	50.08%	658	6.34%	-675	-6.50%	10,377
Pawnee	2,376	39.46%	3,093	51.37%	552	9.17%	-717	-11.91%	6,021
Payne	4,342	43.71%	4,817	48.49%	774	7.79%	-475	-4.78%	9,933
Pittsburg	6,062	56.31%	3,554	33.01%	1,149	10.67%	2,508	23.30%	10,765
Pontotoc	4,268	64.47%	1,859	28.08%	493	7.45%	2,409	36.39%	6,620
Pottawatomie	5,072	48.73%	4,040	38.81%	1,297	12.46%	1,032	9.91%	10,409
Pushmataha	1,647	54.79%	1,084	36.06%	275	9.15%	563	18.73%	3,006
Roger Mills	1,318	47.36%	946	33.99%	519	18.65%	372	13.37%	2,783
Rogers	2,901	54.28%	2,207	41.29%	237	4.43%	694	12.98%	5,345
Seminole	3,007	51.77%	2,326	40.05%	475	8.18%	681	11.73%	5,808
Sequoyah	3,429	53.80%	2,875	45.11%	70	1.10%	554	8.69%	6,374
Stephens	4,745	62.98%	2,377	31.55%	412	5.47%	2,368	31.43%	7,534
Texas	1,812	45.73%	1,745	44.04%	405	10.22%	67	1.69%	3,962
Tillman	2,653	63.73%	1,326	31.85%	184	4.42%	1,327	31.88%	4,163
Tulsa	14,377	40.87%	19,537	55.54%	1,265	3.60%	-5,160	-14.67%	35,179
Wagoner	1,985	50.86%	1,646	42.17%	272	6.97%	339	8.69%	3,903
Washington	3,487	42.01%	4,579	55.17%	234	2.82%	-1,092	-13.16%	8,300
Washita	2,325	57.35%	1,357	33.47%	372	9.18%	968	23.88%	4,054
Woods	1,533	30.73%	2,615	52.43%	840	16.84%	-1,082	-21.69%	4,988
Woodward	1,418	35.34%	1,831	45.64%	763	19.02%	-413	-10.29%	4,012
Totals	255,798	48.45%	225,756	42.76%	46,372	8.78%	30,042	5.69%	527,926

== See also ==
- United States presidential elections in Oklahoma
