= 1976 United States presidential election in Oklahoma =

- November 3, 1976

Nominee	Gerald Ford	Jimmy Carter
Party	Republican	Democratic
Home state	Michigan	Georgia
Running mate	Bob Dole	Walter Mondale
Electoral vote	8	0
Popular vote	545,708	532,442
Percentage	49.96%	48.75%
County results
Ford
50–60%
60–70%
Carter
40–50%
50–60%
60–70%
70–80%
President before election
Gerald Ford
Republican
Elected President
Jimmy Carter
Democratic

The 1976 United States presidential election in Oklahoma took place on November 2, 1976, as part of the 1976 United States presidential election. All fifty states and the District of Columbia participated in the election. Oklahoma voters chose eight electors to the Electoral College, who voted for president and vice president.

Oklahoma was won by incumbent President Gerald Ford (R) by a narrow margin of 1.21 percent. Despite Ford's narrow victory, Oklahoma is a reliably Republican state, and the last Democratic presidential candidate to carry the state was Lyndon Johnson in 1964.

As of the 2024 presidential election, this is the last election in which a Democrat carried one of the three counties in the Oklahoma Panhandle, namely Cimarron County, as well as the last time Grant County, Jackson County, Rogers County, Adair County, Dewey County, Roger Mills County, Lincoln County, Creek County, Grady County, Logan County, McClain County, Pottawatomie County, and Wagoner County voted for a Democratic presidential candidate. Carter's 532,442 votes is the most received by a Democratic presidential candidate in the state's history.

Oklahoma, a very socially conservative state, had last voted for a Democratic presidential nominee in 1964, but Democrats maintained a large advantage in party registration and in the state legislature in this era. Going into election day, ABC News rated the state as a tossup between Democratic Georgia Governor Jimmy Carter and Republican President Gerald Ford.

On election day, Oklahoma voted for Ford by a narrow margin of 1.21% or 13,266 votes. While Carter carried most of the rural counties in southern and eastern Oklahoma, Ford ran up large margins in Tulsa and Oklahoma counties.

== Results ==
Electoral results
Presidential candidate	Party	Home state	Popular vote		Electoral vote	Running mate		
Presidential candidate	Party	Home state	Count	Percentage	Electoral vote	Vice-presidential candidate	Home state	Electoral vote
Gerald Ford (incumbent)	Republican	Michigan	545,708	49.96%	8	Robert Dole	Kansas	8
Jimmy Carter	Democratic	Georgia	534,442	48.75%	0	Walter Mondale	Minnesota	0
Eugene McCarthy	Independent	Minnesota	14,101	1.26%	0	—	—	0
Total			1,094,251	100%	8			8
Needed to win					270			270

=== Results by county ===
County	Gerald Ford Republican		Jimmy Carter Democratic		Eugene McCarthy Independent		Margin		Total votes cast
County	#	%	#	%	#	%	#	%	Total votes cast
Adair	3,013	48.14%	3,183	50.85%	63	1.01%	-170	-2.71%	6,259
Alfalfa	2,113	54.22%	1,725	44.26%	59	1.51%	388	9.96%	3,897
Atoka	1,098	24.94%	3,276	74.42%	28	0.64%	-2,178	-49.48%	4,402
Beaver	1,801	58.84%	1,213	39.63%	47	1.54%	588	19.21%	3,061
Beckham	2,351	33.90%	4,530	65.32%	54	0.78%	-2,179	-31.42%	6,935
Blaine	2,682	53.05%	2,297	45.43%	77	1.52%	385	7.62%	5,056
Bryan	2,848	27.67%	7,410	71.99%	35	0.34%	-4,562	-44.32%	10,293
Caddo	3,854	34.02%	7,382	65.17%	91	0.80%	-3,528	-31.15%	11,327
Canadian	9,766	56.32%	7,288	42.03%	285	1.64%	2,478	14.29%	17,339
Carter	6,668	44.25%	8,319	55.20%	83	0.55%	-1,651	-10.95%	15,070
Cherokee	4,443	42.06%	6,006	56.85%	115	1.09%	-1,563	-14.79%	10,564
Choctaw	1,821	29.66%	4,269	69.53%	50	0.81%	-2,448	-39.87%	6,140
Cimarron	872	46.41%	962	51.20%	45	2.39%	-90	-4.79%	1,879
Cleveland	22,098	51.06%	20,054	46.33%	1,129	2.61%	2,044	4.73%	43,281
Coal	769	29.97%	1,774	69.13%	23	0.90%	-1,005	-39.16%	2,566
Comanche	13,163	50.04%	12,910	49.08%	230	0.87%	253	0.96%	26,303
Cotton	1,127	36.78%	1,911	62.37%	26	0.85%	-784	-25.59%	3,064
Craig	2,540	41.11%	3,577	57.90%	61	0.99%	-1,037	-16.79%	6,178
Creek	8,458	48.08%	8,964	50.96%	169	0.96%	-506	-2.88%	17,591
Custer	4,847	50.78%	4,597	48.16%	102	1.07%	250	2.62%	9,546
Delaware	3,642	42.07%	4,924	56.88%	91	1.05%	-1,282	-14.81%	8,657
Dewey	1,230	43.54%	1,540	54.51%	55	1.95%	-310	-10.97%	2,825
Ellis	1,429	52.04%	1,256	45.74%	61	2.22%	173	6.30%	2,746
Garfield	14,202	60.50%	8,969	38.21%	303	1.29%	5,233	22.29%	23,474
Garvin	3,905	36.21%	6,797	63.02%	83	0.77%	-2,892	-26.81%	10,785
Grady	4,686	39.20%	7,155	59.85%	114	0.95%	-2,469	-20.65%	11,955
Grant	1,685	46.96%	1,853	51.64%	50	1.39%	-168	-4.68%	3,588
Greer	1,164	35.19%	2,113	63.88%	31	0.94%	-949	-28.69%	3,308
Harmon	666	32.57%	1,371	67.04%	8	0.39%	-705	-34.47%	2,045
Harper	1,303	56.16%	978	42.16%	39	1.68%	325	14.00%	2,320
Haskell	1,401	29.08%	3,388	70.32%	29	0.60%	-1,987	-41.24%	4,818
Hughes	1,715	28.79%	4,185	70.27%	56	0.94%	-2,470	-41.48%	5,956
Jackson	3,189	39.07%	4,914	60.20%	60	0.74%	-1,725	-21.13%	8,163
Jefferson	956	29.10%	2,303	70.11%	26	0.79%	-1,347	-41.01%	3,285
Johnston	1,127	28.65%	2,765	70.28%	42	1.07%	-1,638	-41.63%	3,934
Kay	12,441	56.33%	9,371	42.43%	274	1.24%	3,070	13.90%	22,086
Kingfisher	3,443	58.39%	2,372	40.22%	82	1.39%	1,071	18.17%	5,897
Kiowa	1,971	36.37%	3,403	62.79%	46	0.85%	-1,432	-26.42%	5,420
Latimer	1,312	32.57%	2,661	66.06%	55	1.37%	-1,349	-33.49%	4,028
LeFlore	4,907	37.50%	8,033	61.39%	145	1.11%	-3,126	-23.89%	13,085
Lincoln	4,429	46.38%	4,988	52.23%	133	1.39%	-559	-5.85%	9,550
Logan	4,382	47.96%	4,594	50.28%	160	1.75%	-212	-2.32%	9,136
Love	846	30.45%	1,923	69.22%	9	0.32%	-1,077	-38.77%	2,778
McClain	2,444	37.19%	4,048	61.59%	80	1.22%	-1,604	-24.40%	6,572
McCurtain	3,423	30.89%	7,560	68.23%	97	0.88%	-4,137	-37.34%	11,080
McIntosh	1,822	30.29%	4,145	68.91%	48	0.80%	-2,323	-38.62%	6,015
Major	2,282	61.73%	1,357	36.71%	58	1.57%	925	25.02%	3,697
Marshall	1,358	31.41%	2,939	67.97%	27	0.62%	-1,581	-36.56%	4,324
Mayes	5,040	44.14%	6,298	55.15%	81	0.71%	-1,258	-11.01%	11,419
Murray	1,563	34.46%	2,932	64.64%	41	0.90%	-1,369	-30.18%	4,536
Muskogee	10,287	40.89%	14,678	58.35%	190	0.76%	-4,391	-17.46%	25,155
Noble	2,634	53.05%	2,278	45.88%	53	1.07%	356	7.17%	4,965
Nowata	2,077	48.18%	2,195	50.92%	39	0.90%	-118	-2.74%	4,311
Okfuskee	1,630	37.69%	2,663	61.57%	32	0.74%	-1,033	-23.88%	4,325
Oklahoma	119,120	56.69%	87,185	41.49%	3,808	1.81%	31,935	15.20%	210,113
Okmulgee	5,333	38.19%	8,499	60.87%	131	0.94%	-3,166	-22.68%	13,963
Osage	6,398	47.93%	6,832	51.18%	118	0.88%	-434	-3.25%	13,348
Ottawa	4,985	39.83%	7,446	59.50%	84	0.67%	-2,461	-19.67%	12,515
Pawnee	3,111	50.17%	3,031	48.88%	59	0.95%	80	1.29%	6,201
Payne	13,481	56.43%	9,987	41.81%	420	1.76%	3,494	14.62%	23,888
Pittsburg	4,807	30.63%	10,743	68.46%	142	0.90%	-5,936	-37.83%	15,692
Pontotoc	4,895	39.20%	7,466	59.79%	125	1.00%	-2,571	-20.59%	12,486
Pottawatomie	9,090	44.19%	11,255	54.71%	226	1.10%	-2,165	-10.52%	20,571
Pushmataha	1,360	31.08%	2,987	68.26%	29	0.66%	-1,627	-37.18%	4,376
Roger Mills	873	38.92%	1,346	60.01%	24	1.07%	-473	-21.09%	2,243
Rogers	7,318	49.40%	7,368	49.73%	129	0.87%	-50	-0.33%	14,815
Seminole	4,237	41.53%	5,874	57.58%	91	0.89%	-1,637	-16.05%	10,202
Sequoyah	3,938	39.84%	5,873	59.42%	73	0.74%	-1,935	-19.58%	9,884
Stephens	7,099	41.71%	9,795	57.55%	126	0.74%	-2,696	-15.84%	17,020
Texas	3,919	59.56%	2,591	39.38%	70	1.06%	1,328	20.18%	6,580
Tillman	1,802	38.38%	2,852	60.75%	41	0.87%	-1,050	-22.37%	4,695
Tulsa	108,653	61.63%	65,298	37.04%	2,349	1.33%	43,355	24.59%	176,300
Wagoner	5,071	45.86%	5,879	53.17%	107	0.97%	-808	-7.31%	11,057
Washington	14,560	67.19%	6,898	31.83%	212	0.98%	7,662	35.36%	21,670
Washita	2,165	39.14%	3,304	59.74%	62	1.12%	-1,139	-20.60%	5,531
Woods	2,788	51.43%	2,530	46.67%	103	1.90%	258	4.76%	5,421
Woodward	3,782	56.52%	2,807	41.95%	102	1.52%	975	14.57%	6,691
Totals	545,708	49.96%	532,442	48.75%	14,101	1.29%	13,266	1.21%	1,092,251

==== Counties that flipped from Republican to Democratic ====
- Adair
- Atoka
- Beckham
- Bryan
- Caddo
- Carter
- Cherokee
- Choctaw
- Cimarron
- Coal
- Cotton
- Craig
- Creek
- Delaware
- Dewey
- Garvin
- Grady
- Grant
- Greer
- Harmon
- Haskell
- Hughes
- Jackson
- Jefferson
- Johnston
- Kiowa
- Latimer
- LeFlore
- Lincoln
- Logan
- Love
- Marshall
- Mayes
- McClain
- McCurtain
- McIntosh
- Murray
- Muskogee
- Nowata
- Okfuskee
- Okmulgee
- Osage
- Ottawa
- Pittsburg
- Pontotoc
- Pottawatomie
- Pushmataha
- Roger Mills
- Rogers
- Seminole
- Sequoyah
- Stephens
- Tillman
- Wagoner
- Washita

=== By congressional district ===
Ford and Carter each won half of the state's congressional districts, with Ford winning 2 that elected Democrats.

District	Ford	Carter	Representative
1st	61.6%	38.4%	James R. Jones
2nd	45.9%	54.1%	Ted Risenhoover
3rd	36.1%	63.9%	Carl Albert
3rd	36.1%	63.9%	Wes Watkins
4th	46.1%	53.9%	Tom Steed
5th	58.1%	41.9%	John Jarman
5th	58.1%	41.9%	Mickey Edwards
6th	55.2%	44.8%	Glenn English

== See also ==
- United States presidential elections in Oklahoma
