= Lenapah, Oklahoma =

- Town
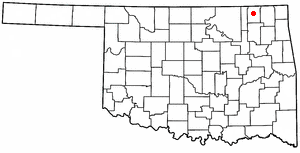
- Location of Lenapah, Oklahoma
- Coordinates: 36°51′05″N 95°38′09″W
- Country: United States
- State: Oklahoma
- County: Nowata

Area
  - Total: 0.41 sq mi (1.07 km^{2})
  - Land: 0.41 sq mi (1.07 km^{2})
  - Water: 0 sq mi (0.00 km^{2})
- Elevation: 755 ft (230 m)

Population (2020)
  - Total: 272
  - Density: 661/sq mi (255.1/km^{2})
- Time zone: UTC-6 (Central (CST))
  - Summer (DST): UTC-5 (CDT)
- ZIP code: 74042
- Area codes: 539/918
- FIPS code: 40-42300
- GNIS feature ID: 2412889

Lenapah is a town in north central Nowata County, Oklahoma, United States, eleven miles north of Nowata and sixty two miles northeast of Tulsa. Its name is an adaptation of Lenape, the name of a Delaware Tribe of Indians. As of the 2020 census, Lenapah had a population of 272.

== History ==
The town is primarily an agricultural community. The Kansas and Arkansas Valley Railway, now part of the Union Pacific Railroad system, established a depot at Lenapah in 1889, and a post office opened in the following year. There were 154 residents in the 1900 census, and 331 at statehood in 1907. The highest population was 434 at the 1920 census.

Oil and natural gas were discovered nearby after the start of the 20th century. Although this activity did not contribute much to the town's growth, it resulted in piping gas to Lenapah's homes and businesses.

== Geography ==
Lenapah is located just west of US Route 169 approximately fourteen miles south of Coffeyville, Kansas and 4.5 miles north of the community of Delaware. The Verdigris River flows past approximately six miles to the east.

According to the United States Census Bureau, the town has a total area of 0.4 square miles (1.0 km^{2}), all land.

== Demographics ==
Historical population
Census	Pop.	Note	%±
1900	154		—
1910	412		167.5%
1920	434		5.3%
1930	336		−22.6%
1940	395		17.6%
1950	328		−17.0%
1960	322		−1.8%
1970	325		0.9%
1980	350		7.7%
1990	253		−27.7%
2000	298		17.8%
2010	293		−1.7%
2020	272		−7.2%
U.S. Decennial Census

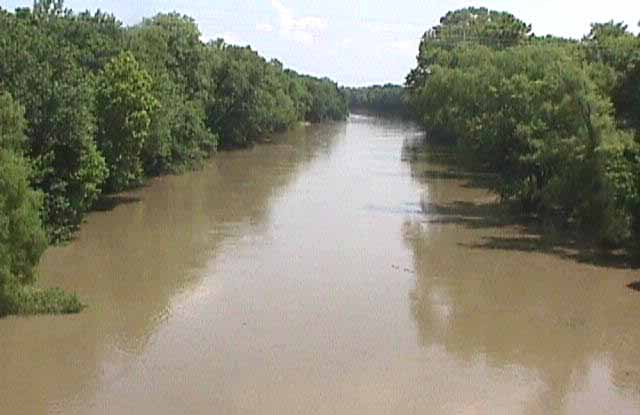
The Verdigris River near Lenapah, Oklahoma

=== 2020 census ===
As of the 2020 census, Lenapah had a population of 272. The median age was 33.0 years. 28.7% of residents were under the age of 18 and 8.8% of residents were 65 years of age or older. For every 100 females there were 107.6 males, and for every 100 females age 18 and over there were 106.4 males age 18 and over.

0.0% of residents lived in urban areas, while 100.0% lived in rural areas.

There were 96 households in Lenapah, of which 42.7% had children under the age of 18 living in them. Of all households, 44.8% were married-couple households, 21.9% were households with a male householder and no spouse or partner present, and 27.1% were households with a female householder and no spouse or partner present. About 24.0% of all households were made up of individuals and 5.2% had someone living alone who was 65 years of age or older.

There were 120 housing units, of which 20.0% were vacant. The homeowner vacancy rate was 0.0% and the rental vacancy rate was 11.4%.

Racial composition as of the 2020 census
Race	Number	Percent
White	148	54.4%
Black or African American	8	2.9%
American Indian and Alaska Native	64	23.5%
Asian	0	0.0%
Native Hawaiian and Other Pacific Islander	0	0.0%
Some other race	0	0.0%
Two or more races	52	19.1%
Hispanic or Latino (of any race)	10	3.7%

=== 2000 census ===
As of the census of 2000, there were 298 people, 109 households, and 81 families residing in the town. The population density was 770.5 inhabitants per square mile (297.5/km^{2}). There were 139 housing units at an average density of 359.4 per square mile (138.8/km^{2}). The racial makeup of the town was 66.78% White, 7.72% African American, 16.78% Native American, 1.01% from other races, and 7.72% from two or more races. Hispanic or Latino of any race were 1.34% of the population.

There were 109 households, out of which 40.4% had children under the age of 18 living with them, 56.9% were married couples living together, 13.8% had a female householder with no husband present, and 24.8% were non-families. 22.0% of all households were made up of individuals, and 14.7% had someone living alone who was 65 years of age or older. The average household size was 2.73 and the average family size was 3.12.

In the town, the population was spread out, with 31.9% under the age of 18, 8.1% from 18 to 24, 28.9% from 25 to 44, 18.5% from 45 to 64, and 12.8% who were 65 years of age or older. The median age was 34 years. For every 100 females, there were 102.7 males. For every 100 females age 18 and over, there were 89.7 males.

The median income for a household in the town was $29,688, and the median income for a family was $35,357. Males had a median income of $31,250 versus $22,000 for females. The per capita income for the town was $14,087. About 14.5% of families and 17.3% of the population were below the poverty line, including 18.5% of those under the age of eighteen and 22.0% of those 65 or over.

== Notable people ==
- Al Downing, musician
- Chris Penn, football player
