= Nowata County, Oklahoma =

County in Oklahoma, United States

- County
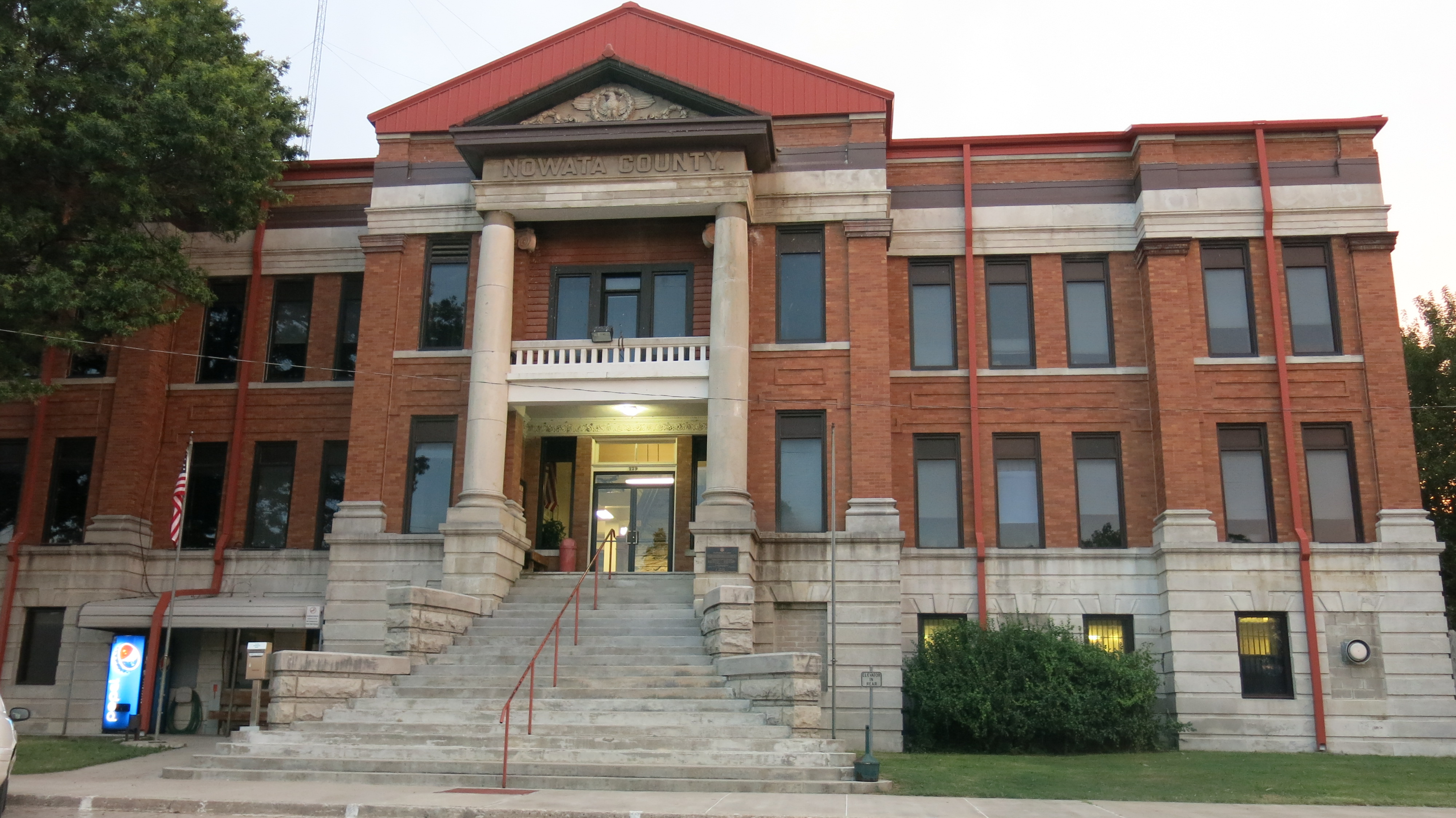
- Nowata County Courthouse in Nowata (2016)

- Location within the U.S. state of Oklahoma
- Coordinates: 36°47′N 95°37′W
- Country: United States
- State: Oklahoma
- Founded: 1907
- Seat: Nowata
- Largest city: Nowata

Area
  - Total: 581 sq mi (1,500 km^{2})
  - Land: 566 sq mi (1,470 km^{2})
  - Water: 15 sq mi (39 km^{2}) 2.6%

Population (2020)
  - Total: 9,320
  - Estimate (2025): 9,522 ▲
  - Density: 16.5/sq mi (6.36/km^{2})
- Congressional district: 2nd
- Website: nowata.com

Nowata County is a county located in northeastern Oklahoma, United States, on the Kansas border. As of the 2020 census, its population is 9,320. Its county seat is Nowata. Their name is derived from a Delaware word, no-we-ata, meaning "come here" or "welcome".

== History ==
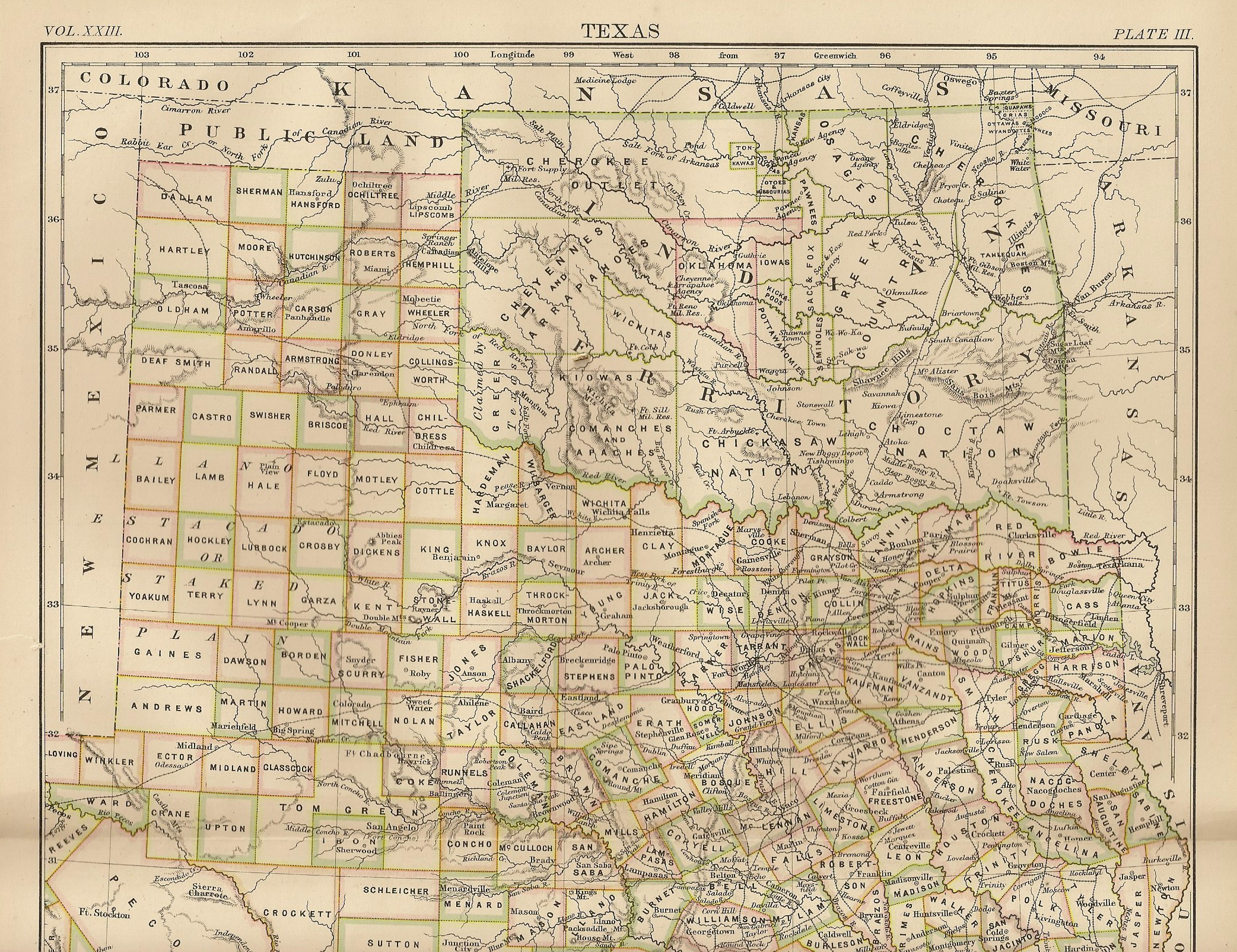
Map of Indian Territory from 1889 Encyclopædia Britannica 9th edition

For millennia, the land now known as Oklahoma was inhabited by Native Americans. The Encyclopedia of Oklahoma History and Culture states that archaeological evidence indicates that humans first lived in this area in the Verdigris River valley over six thousand years ago. In the 17th century, white trappers first visiting the area found it occupied mostly by the Osage and Quapaw tribes. It was recognized as Osage territory by the time United States secured it as part of the Louisiana Purchase in 1803. In 1819, the Arkansas Territory was organized, then was split in 1824 and 1828. An 1828 treaty with the Cherokee Nation assigned the area of Nowata County to the Cherokees, who included it in 1856 in their newly created Cooweescoowee District. The Cherokees and the Delaware signed a treaty in 1867 that resulted in Delaware settlements near the present towns of Delaware, Lenapah and Nowata, Oklahoma.

The state of Oklahoma and Nowata County was established in 1907, and the county had a population of 10,453. The town of Nowata was named as county seat. The exact origin is unknown, but the two most common stories are that railroad surveyors used the Delaware word noweta for welcome or that a sign was posted indicating that local springs had no water: No wata.

== Geography ==
According to the U.S. Census Bureau, the county has a total area of 581 square miles (1,500 km^{2}), of which 566 square miles (1,470 km^{2}) is land and 15 square miles (39 km^{2}) (2.6%) is water.

The Verdigris River divides the county into eastern and western halves. Creeks in the extreme western part of the county drain into the Caney River. All other creeks drain into the Verdigris River. Lake Oologah lies partly in this county.

=== Major highways ===
- U.S. Highway 60
- U.S. Highway 169
- State Highway 10
- State Highway 28

=== Adjacent counties ===
- Montgomery County, Kansas (north)
- Labette County, Kansas (northeast)
- Craig County (east)
- Rogers County (south)
- Washington County (west)

== Demographics ==
Historical population
Census	Pop.	Note	%±
1910	14,223		—
1920	15,899		11.8%
1930	13,611		−14.4%
1940	15,774		15.9%
1950	12,734		−19.3%
1960	10,848		−14.8%
1970	9,773		−9.9%
1980	11,486		17.5%
1990	9,992		−13.0%
2000	10,569		5.8%
2010	10,536		−0.3%
2020	9,320		−11.5%
2025 (est.)	9,522	▲	2.2%
U.S. Decennial Census; 1790-1960 1900-1990; 1990-2000 2010

=== 2020 census ===
As of the 2020 census, the county had a population of 9,320. Of the residents, 22.6% were under the age of 18 and 20.6% were 65 years of age or older; the median age was 43.8 years. For every 100 females there were 96.5 males, and for every 100 females age 18 and over there were 95.7 males.

The racial makeup of the county was 63.3% White, 1.2% Black or African American, 17.2% American Indian and Alaska Native, 0.1% Asian, 0.4% from some other race, and 17.8% from two or more races. Hispanic or Latino residents of any race comprised 2.6% of the population.

There were 3,794 households in the county, of which 29.0% had children under the age of 18 living with them and 24.5% had a female householder with no spouse or partner present. About 28.5% of all households were made up of individuals and 14.2% had someone living alone who was 65 years of age or older.

There were 4,351 housing units, of which 12.8% were vacant. Among occupied housing units, 76.2% were owner-occupied and 23.8% were renter-occupied. The homeowner vacancy rate was 1.5% and the rental vacancy rate was 11.1%.

=== 2000 census ===
As of the 2000 census, there were 10,569 people, 4,147 households, and 2,989 families residing in the county. The population density was 7/km^{2} (18/mi^{2}). There were 4,705 housing units at an average density of 3/km^{2} (7.8/mi^{2}). The racial makeup of the county was 72.43% White, 2.46% Black or African American, 16.56% Native American, 0.12% Asian, 0.26% from other races, and 8.17% from two or more races. 1.23% of the population were Hispanic or Latino of any race.

There were 4,147 households, out of which 31.80% had children under the age of 18 living with them, 58.80% were married couples living together, 9.80% had a female householder with no husband present, and 27.90% were non-families. 25.50% of all households were made up of individuals, and 13.30% had someone living alone who was 65 years of age or older. The average household size was 2.50 and the average family size was 2.97.

In the county, the population was spread out, with 26.10% under the age of 18, 7.60% from 18 to 24, 25.30% from 25 to 44, 23.70% from 45 to 64, and 17.30% who were 65 years of age or older. The median age was 39 years. For every 100 females there were 96.70 males. For every 100 females age 18 and over, there were 93.20 males.

The median income for a household in the county was $29,470, and the median income for a family was $36,354. Males had a median income of $27,047 versus $19,371 for females. The per capita income for the county was $14,244. About 9.00% of families and 14.10% of the population were below the poverty line, including 18.00% of those under age 18 and 11.30% of those age 65 or over.

== Economy ==
The economy of Nowata County has been based on agriculture. The most important crops are wheat, corn, oats, and sorghum. Cattle ranching is also important to the local economy.

== Government ==
The county operates the Nowata County Jail. In 2019 the county government wanted the jail to be open even though there had been a carbon monoxide leak around three weeks prior. The sheriff and several deputies resigned.

The county has renamed or renumbered many addresses so that emergency first responders will be better able to find locations from which 9-1-1 calls have been placed.

== Politics ==
At presidential level, Nowata County has voted for Democratic and Republican candidates at different times in its history, though from 2000, the county has voted solidly Republican.

Voter Registration and Party Enrollment as of June 30, 2023
Party	Number of Voters	Percentage
Democratic	1,424	23.20%
Republican	3,796	61.84%
Others	918	14.96%
Total	6,138	100%

United States presidential election results for Nowata County, Oklahoma
Year	Republican		Democratic		Third party(ies)	
Year	No.	%	No.	%	No.	%
1908	1,020	51.20%	909	45.63%	63	3.16%
1912	1,087	47.86%	1,012	44.56%	172	7.57%
1916	1,322	46.21%	1,355	47.36%	184	6.43%
1920	2,679	60.19%	1,697	38.13%	75	1.69%
1924	2,296	51.03%	2,049	45.54%	154	3.42%
1928	2,930	62.18%	1,763	37.42%	19	0.40%
1932	1,900	33.49%	3,773	66.51%	0	0.00%
1936	2,552	41.95%	3,512	57.73%	20	0.33%
1940	3,406	48.24%	3,615	51.20%	39	0.55%
1944	2,730	51.26%	2,581	48.46%	15	0.28%
1948	2,119	44.08%	2,688	55.92%	0	0.00%
1952	3,226	54.84%	2,657	45.16%	0	0.00%
1956	3,168	58.28%	2,268	41.72%	0	0.00%
1960	3,014	58.65%	2,125	41.35%	0	0.00%
1964	2,142	44.76%	2,644	55.24%	0	0.00%
1968	2,116	46.92%	1,314	29.14%	1,080	23.95%
1972	3,293	72.61%	1,096	24.17%	146	3.22%
1976	2,077	48.18%	2,195	50.92%	39	0.90%
1980	2,640	59.06%	1,694	37.90%	136	3.04%
1984	3,030	63.64%	1,687	35.43%	44	0.92%
1988	2,000	47.24%	2,203	52.03%	31	0.73%
1992	1,531	33.84%	1,912	42.26%	1,081	23.89%
1996	1,457	37.80%	1,788	46.39%	609	15.80%
2000	2,069	53.75%	1,703	44.25%	77	2.00%
2004	2,805	62.82%	1,660	37.18%	0	0.00%
2008	3,031	68.24%	1,411	31.76%	0	0.00%
2012	2,832	69.48%	1,244	30.52%	0	0.00%
2016	3,321	78.38%	742	17.51%	174	4.11%
2020	3,610	82.21%	712	16.21%	69	1.57%
2024	3,774	82.75%	720	15.79%	67	1.47%

== Communities ==
=== City ===
- Nowata (county seat)

=== Towns ===
- Delaware
- Lenapah
- New Alluwe
- South Coffeyville
- Wann

=== Unincorporated communities ===
- Alluwe (ghost town)
- Watova (census-designated place)
- Childers

== Historic Places ==
The following sites in Nowata County are listed on the National Register of Historic Places:

- Cemetery Patent 110, Delaware
- Diamond Point School, Nowata
- Nowata County Courthouse, Nowata
