= 1920 United States presidential election in Oklahoma =

- November 2, 1920
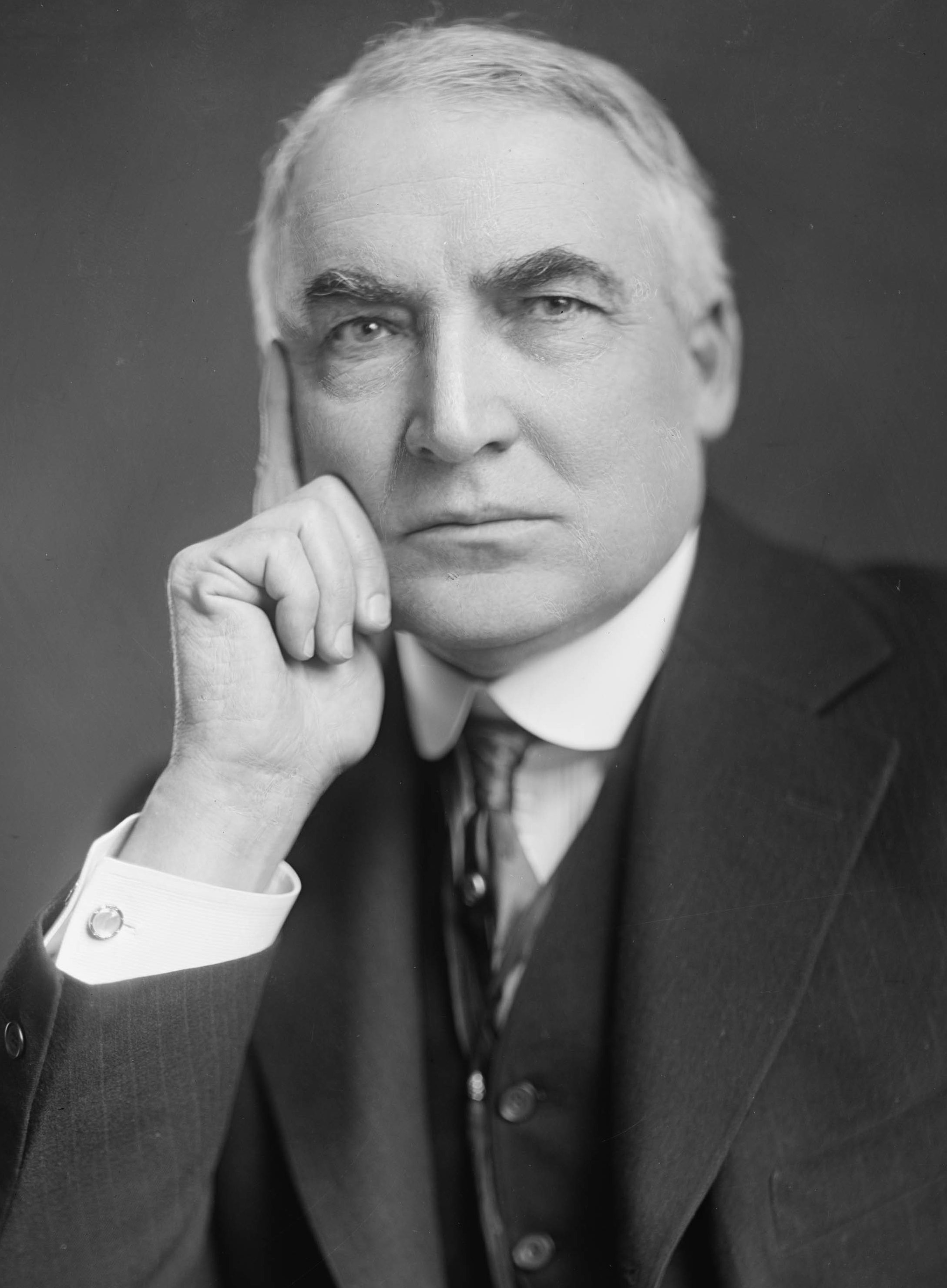

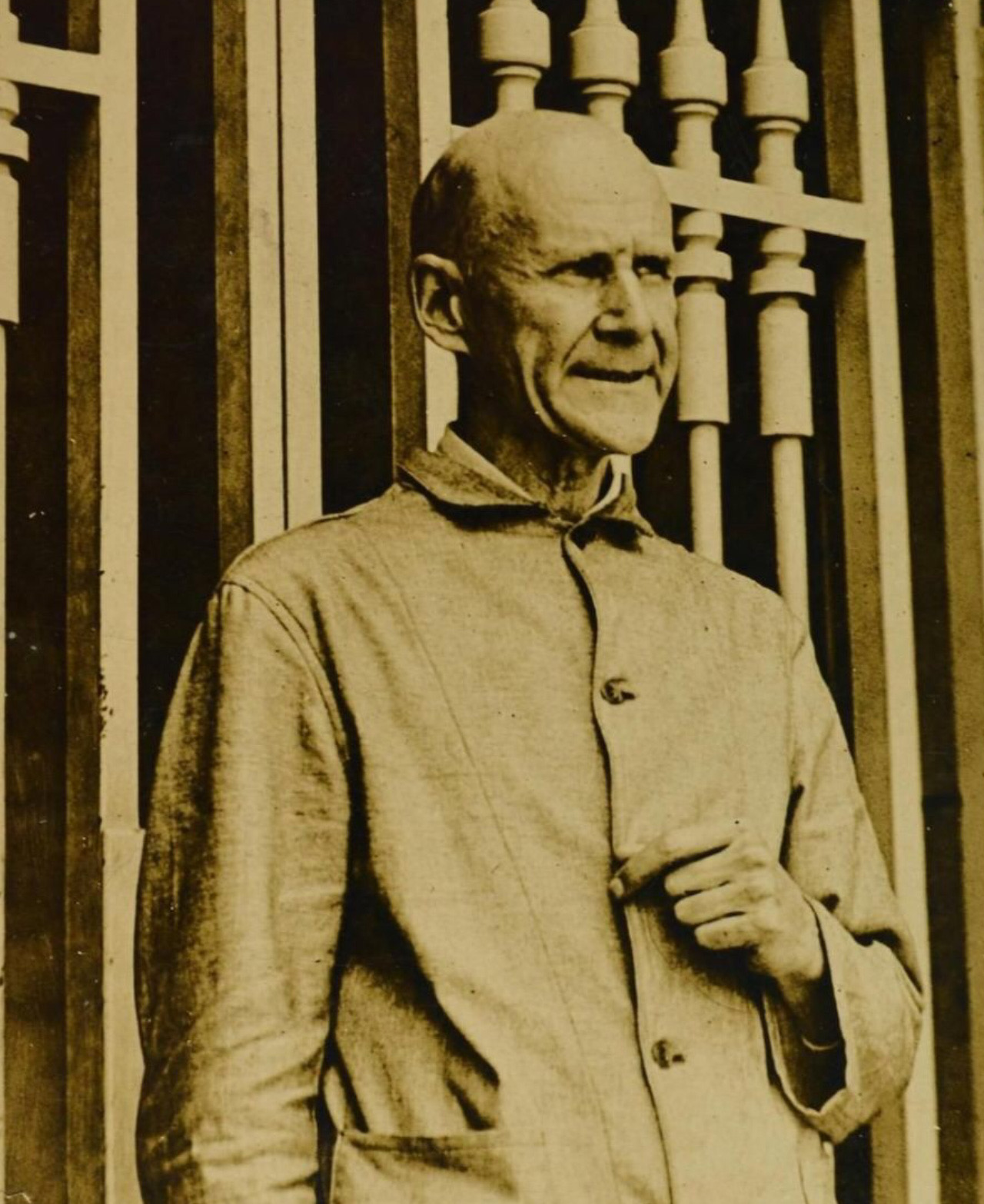
Nominee	Warren G. Harding	James M. Cox	Eugene V. Debs
Party	Republican	Democratic	Socialist
Home state	Ohio	Ohio	Indiana
Running mate	Calvin Coolidge	Franklin D. Roosevelt	Seymour Stedman
Electoral vote	10	0	0
Popular vote	243,831	217,053	25,726
Percentage	50.11%	44.61%	5.29%
County results
Harding
40–50%
50–60%
60–70%
Cox
40–50%
50–60%
60–70%
President before election
Woodrow Wilson
Democratic
Elected President
Warren G. Harding
Republican

The 1920 United States presidential election in Oklahoma took place on November 2, 1920, as part of the 1920 United States presidential election which was held throughout all contemporary 48 states. Voters chose ten representatives, or electors to the Electoral College, who voted for president and vice president.

In its early years, Oklahoma was a “Solid South” Democratic state whose founding fathers like "Alfalfa Bill" Murray and Charles N. Haskell had disfranchised most of its black population via literacy tests and grandfather clauses, the latter of which would be declared unconstitutional in Guinn v. United States. Partly owing to the absence of the poll taxes found in other Southern states due to the strength of populism amongst the state's white settlers, the state became a stronghold of the Socialist Party in the 1910s, especially in the southeast and the northwestern Plains.

However, despite being less stridently isolationist than states further north in the Great Plains, Oklahoma was nonetheless caught up in the hostility towards President Wilson and his various foreign policy proposals, as well as his inability to deal with large-scale domestic conflict. In early polls this was thought insufficient to split the state from the “Solid South”, but as it turned out a large swing caused the Democrats to lose the state, alongside Tennessee, for the first break in the “Solid South” since Reconstruction. The Republicans also elected a Senator and five Congressmen, so strong was the hostility towards Wilson.

Oklahoma voted for the Republican nominee, Ohio Senator Warren G. Harding, over the Democratic nominee, Ohio Governor James M. Cox and Socialist nominee Eugene V. Debs of Indiana. Harding ran with Massachusetts Governor Calvin Coolidge, while Cox ran with Assistant Secretary of the Navy Franklin D. Roosevelt of New York and Debs ran with Seymour Stedman of Illinois. Harding won the state by a margin of 5.5 percentage points. As a result of his win, Harding became the first Republican presidential candidate to win Oklahoma. This was the only election until 2008 in which Oklahoma did not vote the same way as Virginia.

== Results ==
General Election Results
Party	Pledged to	Elector	Votes
Republican Party	Warren G. Harding	Joseph W. Morris	243,831
Republican Party	Warren G. Harding	James S. Mabon	243,610
Republican Party	Warren G. Harding	Abbie B. Hillerman	243,609
Republican Party	Warren G. Harding	H. P. Warfield	243,607
Republican Party	Warren G. Harding	A. W. Green	243,582
Republican Party	Warren G. Harding	Charles E. Goodwin	243,559
Republican Party	Warren G. Harding	C. H. Wilson	243,516
Republican Party	Warren G. Harding	Jake Sims	243,513
Republican Party	Warren G. Harding	W. G. Roe	243,464
Republican Party	Warren G. Harding	Daisy A. Riehl	243,284
Democratic Party	James M. Cox	W. S. Vernon	217,753
Democratic Party	James M. Cox	E. B. Johnson	216,171
Democratic Party	James M. Cox	Roberta E. Lawson	216,158
Democratic Party	James M. Cox	Ira C. Haycock	216,029
Democratic Party	James M. Cox	John C. Cassidy	216,024
Democratic Party	James M. Cox	C. V. Porter	216,020
Democratic Party	James M. Cox	Felix C. Duvall	216,010
Democratic Party	James M. Cox	A. McCrory	215,940
Democratic Party	James M. Cox	George Trice	215,808
Democratic Party	James M. Cox	Elmer L. Fulton	215,803
Socialist Party	Eugene V. Debs	Sallie I. Long	25,726
Socialist Party	Eugene V. Debs	Flora Brinker	25,724
Socialist Party	Eugene V. Debs	Sarah Geist	25,716
Socialist Party	Eugene V. Debs	Ed. F. Winterburg	25,683
Socialist Party	Eugene V. Debs	Kate E. Stiles	25,679
Socialist Party	Eugene V. Debs	J. C. Calhoun	25,663
Socialist Party	Eugene V. Debs	Herman Hobbie	25,662
Socialist Party	Eugene V. Debs	R. M. Price	25,609
Socialist Party	Eugene V. Debs	Steve M. Gipson	25,551
Socialist Party	Eugene V. Debs	C. C. Guy	25,484
Votes cast (Note: Based on totals for highest elector on each ticket)			487,310

=== Results by county ===
Results by county
County	Warren Gamaliel Harding Republican		James Middleton Cox Democratic		Eugene Victor Debs Socialist		Margin		Total votes cast
County	#	%	#	%	#	%	#	%	Total votes cast
Adair	2,181	57.90%	1,560	41.41%	26	0.69%	621	16.49%	3,767
Alfalfa	3,009	63.56%	1,363	28.79%	362	7.65%	1,646	34.77%	4,734
Atoka	2,081	43.14%	2,106	43.66%	637	13.20%	−25	−0.52%	4,824
Beaver	1,973	59.91%	1,079	32.77%	241	7.32%	894	27.15%	3,293
Beckham	1,755	36.93%	2,352	49.49%	645	13.57%	−597	−12.56%	4,752
Blaine	2,786	61.54%	1,303	28.78%	438	9.68%	1,483	32.76%	4,527
Bryan	3,127	38.83%	4,502	55.90%	424	5.27%	−1,375	−17.07%	8,053
Caddo	4,826	53.17%	3,595	39.61%	655	7.22%	1,231	13.56%	9,076
Canadian	3,894	52.18%	3,273	43.86%	295	3.95%	621	8.32%	7,462
Carter	3,561	35.12%	6,003	59.20%	576	5.68%	−2,442	−24.08%	10,140
Cherokee	2,524	56.48%	1,859	41.60%	86	1.92%	665	14.88%	4,469
Choctaw (Note: Republican: the official returns print 2,988 for elector Daisy A. Riehl, against 2,086–2,094 for the other nine; treated as a typing error.)	2,094	42.64%	2,534	51.60%	283	5.76%	−440	−8.96%	4,911
Cimarron	630	53.48%	465	39.47%	83	7.05%	165	14.01%	1,178
Cleveland	2,283	45.80%	2,397	48.08%	305	6.12%	−114	−2.29%	4,985
Coal	1,748	43.37%	1,797	44.59%	485	12.03%	−49	−1.22%	4,030
Comanche	3,332	48.91%	3,049	44.75%	432	6.34%	283	4.15%	6,813
Cotton	1,820	42.76%	2,264	53.20%	172	4.04%	−444	−10.43%	4,256
Craig	3,095	50.82%	2,908	47.75%	87	1.43%	187	3.07%	6,090
Creek	7,948	56.84%	5,417	38.74%	618	4.42%	2,531	18.10%	13,983
Custer	3,228	55.18%	2,279	38.96%	343	5.86%	949	16.22%	5,850
Delaware (Note: Democratic: the official returns print 1,385 (C. V. Porter) and 1,383 (Felix Duvall), against 1,280–1,285 for the other eight; treated as typing errors.)	2,059	59.08%	1,285	36.87%	141	4.05%	774	22.21%	3,485
Dewey	1,738	51.71%	998	29.69%	625	18.60%	740	22.02%	3,361
Ellis	1,786	59.02%	858	28.35%	382	12.62%	928	30.67%	3,026
Garfield	6,618	60.74%	3,683	33.80%	595	5.46%	2,935	26.94%	10,896
Garvin	2,922	40.07%	4,096	56.17%	274	3.76%	−1,174	−16.10%	7,292
Grady	3,412	41.56%	4,320	52.62%	478	5.82%	−908	−11.06%	8,210
Grant	3,210	60.45%	1,893	35.65%	207	3.90%	1,317	24.80%	5,310
Greer	1,013	32.71%	1,857	59.96%	227	7.33%	−844	−27.25%	3,097
Harmon	643	34.06%	1,129	59.80%	116	6.14%	−486	−25.74%	1,888
Harper	1,404	59.87%	757	32.28%	184	7.85%	647	27.59%	2,345
Haskell (Note: Republican: the official returns print 3,673 for elector A. W. Green, against 2,673 for the other nine; treated as a typing error.)	2,673	52.66%	2,202	43.38%	201	3.96%	471	9.28%	5,076
Hughes	3,049	45.55%	3,495	52.21%	150	2.24%	−446	−6.66%	6,694
Jackson	1,345	30.12%	2,703	60.54%	417	9.34%	−1,358	−30.41%	4,465
Jefferson	1,733	39.34%	2,290	51.99%	382	8.67%	−557	−12.64%	4,405
Johnston	1,952	43.60%	2,133	47.64%	392	8.76%	−181	−4.04%	4,477
Kay	5,961	55.19%	4,609	42.67%	231	2.14%	1,352	12.52%	10,801
Kingfisher (Note: Republican: the official returns print 1,207–1,220 for all ten Republican electors, but the statewide totals and the Senate vote (3,077 for Harreld) show the leading digit should be 3; the highest figure is given as 3,220.)	3,220	61.50%	1,767	33.75%	249	4.76%	1,453	27.75%	5,236
Kiowa	2,649	47.13%	2,529	44.99%	443	7.88%	120	2.13%	5,621
Latimer	1,410	47.68%	1,214	41.06%	333	11.26%	196	6.63%	2,957
Le Flore	4,934	54.27%	3,770	41.47%	387	4.26%	1,164	12.80%	9,091
Lincoln	5,264	59.22%	2,985	33.58%	640	7.20%	2,279	25.64%	8,889
Logan	4,618	64.88%	2,218	31.16%	282	3.96%	2,400	33.72%	7,118
Love	716	28.30%	1,662	65.69%	152	6.01%	−946	−37.39%	2,530
Major	1,924	60.05%	784	24.47%	496	15.48%	1,140	35.58%	3,204
Marshall (Note: Democratic: the official returns print 1,889 for electors Roberta E. Lawson and W. S. Vernon, against 1,589 for the other eight; treated as typing errors.)	1,487	44.45%	1,589	47.50%	269	8.04%	−102	−3.05%	3,345
Mayes	2,448	53.15%	1,995	43.31%	163	3.54%	453	9.83%	4,606
McClain	1,733	40.24%	2,324	53.96%	250	5.80%	−591	−13.72%	4,307
McCurtain	1,966	40.17%	2,610	53.33%	318	6.50%	−644	−13.16%	4,894
McIntosh	2,358	44.81%	2,645	50.27%	259	4.92%	−287	−5.45%	5,262
Murray	1,362	42.14%	1,749	54.12%	121	3.74%	−387	−11.97%	3,232
Muskogee	5,187	44.43%	6,389	54.72%	99	0.85%	−1,202	−10.30%	11,675
Noble	2,467	59.57%	1,520	36.71%	154	3.72%	947	22.87%	4,141
Nowata	2,680	59.92%	1,718	38.41%	75	1.68%	962	21.51%	4,473
Okfuskee	1,769	48.20%	1,659	45.20%	242	6.59%	110	3.00%	3,670
Oklahoma	15,350	44.59%	17,854	51.86%	1,221	3.55%	−2,504	−7.27%	34,425
Okmulgee (Note: Republican: the official returns print 5,570 for elector Daisy A. Riehl, against 5,316–5,373 for the other nine; treated as a typing error.)	5,373	51.34%	4,499	42.99%	593	5.67%	874	8.35%	10,465
Osage	4,569	52.86%	3,818	44.17%	256	2.96%	751	8.69%	8,643
Ottawa	5,298	54.91%	3,978	41.23%	372	3.86%	1,320	13.68%	9,648
Pawnee	2,982	56.05%	1,966	36.95%	372	6.99%	1,016	19.10%	5,320
Payne	4,583	54.73%	3,242	38.72%	549	6.56%	1,341	16.01%	8,374
Pittsburg	5,371	46.99%	5,375	47.03%	683	5.98%	−4	−0.03%	11,429
Pontotoc	2,370	37.16%	3,801	59.60%	206	3.23%	−1,431	−22.44%	6,377
Pottawatomie	5,357	47.50%	5,325	47.22%	595	5.28%	32	0.28%	11,277
Pushmataha	1,864	53.24%	1,370	39.13%	267	7.63%	494	14.11%	3,501
Roger Mills	1,194	46.66%	937	36.62%	428	16.73%	257	10.04%	2,559
Rogers	2,852	51.56%	2,463	44.53%	216	3.91%	389	7.03%	5,531
Seminole	3,389	60.63%	1,883	33.69%	318	5.69%	1,506	26.94%	5,590
Sequoyah	3,195	54.94%	2,507	43.11%	113	1.94%	688	11.83%	5,815
Stephens	2,040	39.13%	2,826	54.20%	348	6.67%	−786	−15.07%	5,214
Texas	1,762	53.30%	1,408	42.59%	136	4.11%	354	10.71%	3,306
Tillman (Note: Democratic: the official returns print 3,649 for elector A. McCrory, against 2,640–2,659 for the other nine; treated as a typing error.)	1,540	35.39%	2,659	61.11%	152	3.49%	−1,119	−25.72%	4,351
Tulsa	14,495	57.56%	10,048	39.90%	640	2.54%	4,447	17.66%	25,183
Wagoner	1,433	47.93%	1,399	46.79%	158	5.28%	34	1.14%	2,990
Washington	4,105	57.78%	2,811	39.56%	189	2.66%	1,294	18.21%	7,105
Washita	2,070	45.82%	2,127	47.08%	321	7.10%	−57	−1.26%	4,518
Woods	2,827	60.28%	1,531	32.64%	332	7.08%	1,296	27.63%	4,690
Woodward	2,495	58.98%	1,444	34.14%	291	6.88%	1,051	24.85%	4,230
Totals	244,119	50.15%	216,811	44.54%	25,883	5.32%	27,308	5.61%	486,813

== See also ==
- United States presidential elections in Oklahoma
