= 1964 United States presidential election in Oklahoma =

- November 3, 1964

| Nominee | Lyndon B. Johnson | Barry Goldwater |
| Party | Democratic | Republican |
| Home state | Texas | Arizona |
| Running mate | Hubert Humphrey | William E. Miller |
| Electoral vote | 8 | 0 |
| Popular vote | 519,834 | 412,665 |
| Percentage | 55.75% | 44.25% |
County results
Johnson
50–60%
60–70%
70–80%
Goldwater
50–60%
60–70%
President before election
Lyndon B. Johnson
Democratic
Elected President
Lyndon B. Johnson
Democratic

The 1964 United States presidential election in Oklahoma took place on November 3, 1964. All fifty states and The District of Columbia were part of the 1964 United States presidential election. Voters chose eight electors to the Electoral College, who voted for president and vice president.

Incumbent President Lyndon B. Johnson of Texas, the Democratic Party candidate, won Oklahoma with an 11.49 percent margin of victory against Senator Barry Goldwater of Arizona, winning its eight electoral votes. Oklahoma had begun trending Republican since 1952, with the margin of victory steadily increasing. In 1964, a majority of voters rejected the staunchly conservative Goldwater, who was portrayed as a right-wing extremist, and defected to the more moderate Johnson.

In typical fashion for the time, Johnson overwhelmingly won Southern Oklahoma, the most Democratic region of the state, carrying every county with over 60% of the vote. Goldwater performed strongly in the northern region including the Oklahoma Panhandle and Garfield County, home to Enid. Goldwater was able to hold Johnson below 60% in counties he won in this region except for Ottawa County and Craig County. As for the major urban areas, Johnson carried Oklahoma County, home of Oklahoma City, 52%–48%, while Goldwater carried Tulsa County 55%–45%. As a result, Oklahoma weighed in as 11.08 percentage points more Republican than the national average.

As of the 2024 presidential election, this is the only presidential race since 1948 where Oklahoma voted Democratic. Johnson was also the last Democrat to carry Oklahoma County (home to Oklahoma City), Cleveland County (home to Norman), Comanche County, Canadian County, Custer County, Noble County, and Payne County (home to Stillwater). Despite this, Oklahoma would remain reliably Democratic at the state level for the next several decades.

Johnson's strong performance likely helped fellow Democrat Fred R. Harris down-ballot in his narrow victory in the concurrent special election to the United States Senate.

== Results ==
1964 United States presidential election in Oklahoma
| Party | Candidate | Votes | Percentage | Electoral votes |
|---|---|---|---|---|
| Democratic | Lyndon B. Johnson (inc.) | 519,834 | 55.75% | 8 |
| Republican | Barry Goldwater | 412,665 | 44.25% | 0 |
| Totals | | 932,499 | 100.0% | 8 |
| Voter turnout (voting age/registered voters) | | | | 63%/71% |

=== Results by county ===
| County | Lyndon B. Johnson Democratic | | Barry Goldwater Republican | | Margin | | Total votes cast |
| County | # | % | # | % | # | % | Total votes cast |
|---|---|---|---|---|---|---|---|
| Adair | 3,003 | 51.23% | 2,859 | 48.77% | 144 | 2.46% | 5,862 |
| Alfalfa | 1,730 | 41.39% | 2,450 | 58.61% | −720 | −17.22% | 4,180 |
| Atoka | 2,459 | 63.33% | 1,424 | 36.67% | 1,035 | 26.66% | 3,883 |
| Beaver | 1,508 | 43.21% | 1,982 | 56.79% | −474 | −13.58% | 3,490 |
| Beckham | 4,115 | 61.68% | 2,557 | 38.32% | 1,558 | 23.36% | 6,672 |
| Blaine | 2,384 | 46.52% | 2,741 | 53.48% | −357 | −6.96% | 5,125 |
| Bryan | 5,934 | 69.11% | 2,652 | 30.89% | 3,282 | 38.22% | 8,586 |
| Caddo | 7,447 | 66.66% | 3,724 | 33.34% | 3,723 | 33.32% | 11,171 |
| Canadian | 5,747 | 52.53% | 5,193 | 47.47% | 554 | 5.06% | 10,940 |
| Carter | 10,645 | 68.10% | 4,986 | 31.90% | 5,659 | 36.20% | 15,631 |
| Cherokee | 4,449 | 56.20% | 3,467 | 43.80% | 982 | 12.40% | 7,916 |
| Choctaw | 3,969 | 69.79% | 1,718 | 30.21% | 2,251 | 39.58% | 5,687 |
| Cimarron | 878 | 41.75% | 1,225 | 58.25% | −347 | −16.50% | 2,103 |
| Cleveland | 11,599 | 54.57% | 9,656 | 45.43% | 1,943 | 9.14% | 21,255 |
| Coal | 1,613 | 69.11% | 721 | 30.89% | 892 | 38.22% | 2,334 |
| Comanche | 13,585 | 63.12% | 7,936 | 36.88% | 5,649 | 26.24% | 21,521 |
| Cotton | 2,216 | 66.37% | 1,123 | 33.63% | 1,093 | 32.74% | 3,339 |
| Craig | 3,838 | 60.17% | 2,541 | 39.83% | 1,297 | 20.34% | 6,379 |
| Creek | 9,836 | 60.75% | 6,355 | 39.25% | 3,481 | 21.50% | 16,191 |
| Custer | 4,464 | 57.04% | 3,362 | 42.96% | 1,102 | 14.08% | 7,826 |
| Delaware | 3,702 | 57.44% | 2,743 | 42.56% | 959 | 14.88% | 6,445 |
| Dewey | 1,617 | 52.96% | 1,438 | 47.04% | 179 | 5.92% | 3,055 |
| Ellis | 1,120 | 43.55% | 1,452 | 56.45% | −332 | −12.90% | 2,572 |
| Garfield | 10,175 | 45.28% | 12,297 | 54.72% | −2,122 | −9.44% | 22,472 |
| Garvin | 7,013 | 66.90% | 3,470 | 33.10% | 3,543 | 33.80% | 10,483 |
| Grady | 7,593 | 68.03% | 3,569 | 31.97% | 4,024 | 36.06% | 11,162 |
| Grant | 2,120 | 51.56% | 1,992 | 48.44% | 128 | 3.12% | 4,112 |
| Greer | 2,671 | 68.17% | 1,247 | 31.83% | 1,424 | 36.34% | 3,918 |
| Harmon | 1,665 | 73.45% | 602 | 26.55% | 1,063 | 46.90% | 2,267 |
| Harper | 1,240 | 47.35% | 1,379 | 52.65% | −139 | −5.30% | 2,619 |
| Haskell | 2,542 | 65.23% | 1,355 | 34.77% | 1,187 | 30.46% | 3,897 |
| Hughes | 4,477 | 72.57% | 1,692 | 27.43% | 2,785 | 45.14% | 6,169 |
| Jackson | 5,894 | 71.36% | 2,366 | 28.64% | 3,528 | 42.72% | 8,260 |
| Jefferson | 2,555 | 75.91% | 811 | 24.09% | 1,744 | 51.82% | 3,366 |
| Johnston | 2,370 | 69.00% | 1,065 | 31.00% | 1,305 | 38.00% | 3,435 |
| Kay | 11,296 | 48.42% | 12,033 | 51.58% | −737 | −3.16% | 23,329 |
| Kingfisher | 2,512 | 44.63% | 3,117 | 55.37% | −605 | −10.74% | 5,629 |
| Kiowa | 3,686 | 62.56% | 2,206 | 37.44% | 1,480 | 25.12% | 5,892 |
| Latimer | 2,297 | 73.01% | 849 | 26.99% | 1,448 | 46.02% | 3,146 |
| LeFlore | 7,105 | 64.54% | 3,904 | 35.46% | 3,201 | 29.08% | 11,009 |
| Lincoln | 5,046 | 56.70% | 3,854 | 43.30% | 1,192 | 13.40% | 8,900 |
| Logan | 4,279 | 53.05% | 3,787 | 46.95% | 492 | 6.10% | 8,066 |
| Love | 1,863 | 73.75% | 663 | 26.25% | 1,200 | 47.50% | 2,526 |
| McClain | 3,638 | 68.95% | 1,638 | 31.05% | 2,000 | 37.90% | 5,276 |
| McCurtain | 5,982 | 66.74% | 2,981 | 33.26% | 3,001 | 33.48% | 8,963 |
| McIntosh | 3,497 | 71.01% | 1,428 | 28.99% | 2,069 | 42.02% | 4,925 |
| Major | 1,291 | 34.64% | 2,436 | 65.36% | −1,145 | −30.72% | 3,727 |
| Marshall | 2,318 | 67.80% | 1,101 | 32.20% | 1,217 | 35.60% | 3,419 |
| Mayes | 5,421 | 56.60% | 4,157 | 43.40% | 1,264 | 13.20% | 9,578 |
| Murray | 3,083 | 71.38% | 1,236 | 28.62% | 1,847 | 42.76% | 4,319 |
| Muskogee | 16,330 | 65.75% | 8,508 | 34.25% | 7,822 | 31.50% | 24,838 |
| Noble | 2,713 | 55.71% | 2,157 | 44.29% | 556 | 11.42% | 4,870 |
| Nowata | 2,644 | 55.24% | 2,142 | 44.76% | 502 | 10.48% | 4,786 |
| Okfuskee | 2,905 | 64.07% | 1,629 | 35.93% | 1,276 | 28.14% | 4,534 |
| Oklahoma | 90,641 | 52.00% | 83,660 | 48.00% | 6,981 | 4.00% | 174,301 |
| Okmulgee | 10,195 | 68.43% | 4,704 | 31.57% | 5,491 | 36.86% | 14,899 |
| Osage | 7,395 | 56.49% | 5,695 | 43.51% | 1,700 | 12.98% | 13,090 |
| Ottawa | 7,589 | 64.98% | 4,090 | 35.02% | 3,499 | 29.96% | 11,679 |
| Pawnee | 2,389 | 51.19% | 2,278 | 48.81% | 111 | 2.38% | 4,667 |
| Payne | 8,906 | 52.88% | 7,936 | 47.12% | 970 | 5.76% | 16,842 |
| Pittsburg | 9,903 | 73.58% | 3,555 | 26.42% | 6,348 | 47.16% | 13,458 |
| Pontotoc | 7,449 | 64.13% | 4,166 | 35.87% | 3,283 | 28.26% | 11,615 |
| Pottawatomie | 10,884 | 61.40% | 6,841 | 38.60% | 4,043 | 22.80% | 17,725 |
| Pushmataha | 2,563 | 65.80% | 1,332 | 34.20% | 1,231 | 31.60% | 3,895 |
| Roger Mills | 1,345 | 59.23% | 926 | 40.77% | 419 | 18.46% | 2,271 |
| Rogers | 5,449 | 56.46% | 4,202 | 43.54% | 1,247 | 12.92% | 9,651 |
| Seminole | 6,582 | 64.16% | 3,676 | 35.84% | 2,906 | 28.32% | 10,258 |
| Sequoyah | 4,304 | 60.20% | 2,846 | 39.80% | 1,458 | 20.40% | 7,150 |
| Stephens | 9,272 | 63.53% | 5,323 | 36.47% | 3,949 | 27.06% | 14,595 |
| Texas | 2,500 | 42.82% | 3,339 | 57.18% | −839 | −14.36% | 5,839 |
| Tillman | 3,354 | 62.63% | 2,001 | 37.37% | 1,353 | 25.26% | 5,355 |
| Tulsa | 61,484 | 44.47% | 76,770 | 55.53% | −15,286 | −11.06% | 138,254 |
| Wagoner | 3,957 | 58.22% | 2,840 | 41.78% | 1,117 | 16.44% | 6,797 |
| Washington | 8,571 | 40.91% | 12,382 | 59.09% | −3,811 | −18.18% | 20,953 |
| Washita | 3,339 | 60.86% | 2,147 | 39.14% | 1,192 | 21.72% | 5,486 |
| Woods | 2,750 | 48.79% | 2,886 | 51.21% | −136 | −2.42% | 5,636 |
| Woodward | 2,934 | 48.67% | 3,094 | 51.33% | −160 | −2.66% | 6,028 |
| Totals | 519,834 | 55.75% | 412,665 | 44.25% | 107,169 | 11.50% | 932,499 |

==== Counties that flipped from Republican to Democratic ====
- Adair
- Atoka
- Beckham
- Caddo
- Canadian
- Cherokee
- Cleveland
- Comanche
- Custer
- Craig
- Creek
- Delaware
- Dewey
- Grant
- Garvin
- Grady
- Greer
- Haskell
- Hughes
- Kiowa
- Lincoln
- Logan
- LeFlore
- McClain
- Mayes
- McIntosh
- Muskogee
- Nowata
- Noble
- Oklahoma
- Osage
- Okfuskee
- Ottawa
- Pawnee
- Payne
- Pottawatomie
- Pontotoc
- Pushmataha
- Roger Mills
- Rogers
- Seminole
- Sequoyah
- Stephens
- Wagoner
- Washita

== See also ==
- United States presidential elections in Oklahoma
