= Delaware, Oklahoma =

- Town
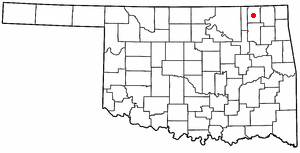
- Location of Delaware, Oklahoma
- Coordinates: 36°46′44″N 95°38′33″W
- Country: United States
- State: Oklahoma
- County: Nowata

Area
  - Total: 0.39 sq mi (1.02 km^{2})
  - Land: 0.39 sq mi (1.02 km^{2})
  - Water: 0 sq mi (0.00 km^{2})
- Elevation: 715 ft (218 m)

Population (2020)
  - Total: 267
  - Density: 677.9/sq mi (261.74/km^{2})
- Time zone: UTC-6 (Central (CST))
  - Summer (DST): UTC-5 (CDT)
- ZIP code: 74027
- Area codes: 539/918
- FIPS code: 40-19850
- GNIS feature ID: 2412417

Delaware is a town in Nowata County, Oklahoma, United States. Its population was 267 at the 2020 census, a decline of 35.9% from the 417 recorded in 2010. The town is named for the Eastern Delaware tribe that moved into this area from Kansas after signing a treaty with the Cherokee Nation in 1867.

== History ==
In 1889, the Kansas and Arkansas Valley Railroad built a line through this area. It constructed a switch at the present townsite, which it named Comana Switch. A small community sprung up here, which soon became known as Delaware. The name became permanent when a post office was established by that name on March 19, 1898.

Discovery of oil nearby in 1904 briefly turned Delaware into a boom town with 4000 residents, but the boom burst and the population quickly fell to 108 by November 1907. The population has fluctuated since then, though generally declining from an official high of 804 in 1920.

== Geography ==
Delaware is on rolling prairie just west of the Verdigris River.

According to the United States Census Bureau, the town has a total area of 0.4 square miles (1.0 km^{2}), all land.

== Demographics ==
Historical population
Census	Pop.	Note	%±
1910	662		—
1920	804		21.5%
1930	526		−34.6%
1940	542		3.0%
1950	582		7.4%
1960	540		−7.2%
1970	534		−1.1%
1980	544		1.9%
1990	434		−20.2%
2000	456		5.1%
2010	417		−8.6%
2020	267		−36.0%
U.S. Decennial Census

=== 2020 census ===
As of the 2020 census, Delaware had a population of 267. The median age was 46.4 years. 17.2% of residents were under the age of 18 and 21.7% of residents were 65 years of age or older. For every 100 females there were 97.8 males, and for every 100 females age 18 and over there were 97.3 males age 18 and over.

0.0% of residents lived in urban areas, while 100.0% lived in rural areas.

There were 117 households in Delaware, of which 25.6% had children under the age of 18 living in them. Of all households, 43.6% were married-couple households, 18.8% were households with a male householder and no spouse or partner present, and 29.9% were households with a female householder and no spouse or partner present. About 30.0% of all households were made up of individuals and 14.5% had someone living alone who was 65 years of age or older.

There were 149 housing units, of which 21.5% were vacant. The homeowner vacancy rate was 4.2% and the rental vacancy rate was 7.1%.

Racial composition as of the 2020 census
Race	Number	Percent
White	156	58.4%
Black or African American	0	0.0%
American Indian and Alaska Native	52	19.5%
Asian	1	0.4%
Native Hawaiian and Other Pacific Islander	1	0.4%
Some other race	2	0.7%
Two or more races	55	20.6%
Hispanic or Latino (of any race)	7	2.6%

=== 2000 census ===
As of the 2000 census, 456 people, 171 households, and 129 families resided in the town. The population density was 1,209.6 inhabitants per square mile (467.0/km^{2}). The 194 housing units had an average density of 514.6/sq mi (198.7/km^{2}). The racial makeup of the town was 73.25% White, 21.93% Native American, 0.44% from other races, and 4.39% from two or more races. Hispanic or Latinos of any race were 0.66% of the population.

Of the 171 households, 36.8% had children under 18 living with them, 60.2% were married couples living together, 9.9% had a female householder with no husband present, and 24.0% were not families. About 20.5% of all households were made up of individuals, and 9.9% had someone living alone who was 65 or older. The average household size was 2.67 and the average family size was 3.05.

In the town, the age distribution was 28.1% under 18, 11.0% from 18 to 24, 27.9% from 25 to 44, 20.6% from 45 to 64, and 12.5% who were 65 or older. The median age was 36 years. For every 100 females, there were 109.2 males. For every 100 females 18 and over, there were 97.6 males.

The median income for a household in the town was $28,167, and for a family was $31,071. Males had a median income of $27,917 versus $18,125 for females. The per capita income for the town was $11,099. About 9.7% of families and 18.5% of the population were below the poverty line, including 20.7% of those under age 18 and 22.7% of those age 65 or over.
