= 1952 United States presidential election in Oklahoma =

- November 4, 1952

All 8 Oklahoma votes to the Electoral College

Nominee	Dwight D. Eisenhower	Adlai Stevenson
Party	Republican	Democratic
Home state	New York	Illinois
Running mate	Richard Nixon	John Sparkman
Electoral vote	8	0
Popular vote	518,045	430,939
Percentage	54.59%	45.41%
County results
Eisenhower
50–60%
60–70%
70–80%
80–90%
Stevenson
50–60%
60–70%
70–80%
President before election
Harry S. Truman
Democratic
Elected President
Dwight D. Eisenhower
Republican

The 1952 United States presidential election in Oklahoma took place on November 4, 1952, as part of the 1952 United States presidential election. Voters chose eight electors to the Electoral College, who voted for president and vice president.

Oklahoma was won by Columbia University President Dwight D. Eisenhower (R–New York), running with Senator Richard Nixon, with 54.59 percent of the popular vote, against Adlai Stevenson (D–Illinois), running with Senator John Sparkman, with 45.41 percent of the popular vote.

The electors selected were Jesse Berry of Chandler, J. Kelsey McClure of Oklahoma City, George E. Nobles of Checotah, David G. Reed of Carnagie, Blanche Kay Young and Mary F. Lawson of Oklahoma City, Arch Stout of Wewoka and Earl E. Ridle of Andarko according to The Daily Ardmoreite article of December 13, 1952. All voted, as pledged, for Eisenhower and Nixon.

With his win, Eisenhower became the first Republican presidential candidate since Herbert Hoover in 1928 to win the state.

== Results ==
1952 United States presidential election in Oklahoma
Party	Candidate	Votes	%
Republican	Dwight D. Eisenhower	518,045	54.59%
Democratic	Adlai Stevenson	430,939	45.41%
Total votes		948,984	100%

=== Results by county ===
County	Dwight D. Eisenhower Republican		Adlai Stevenson Democratic		Margin		Total votes cast
County	#	%	#	%	#	%	Total votes cast
Adair	3,037	52.71%	2,725	47.29%	312	5.42%	5,762
Alfalfa	4,155	78.80%	1,118	21.20%	3,037	57.60%	5,273
Atoka	2,004	43.02%	2,654	56.98%	-650	-13.96%	4,658
Beaver	2,539	75.61%	819	24.39%	1,720	51.22%	3,358
Beckham	4,504	53.14%	3,972	46.86%	532	6.28%	8,476
Blaine	4,851	72.65%	1,826	27.35%	3,025	45.30%	6,677
Bryan	3,340	33.14%	6,739	66.86%	-3,399	-33.72%	10,079
Caddo	6,834	52.62%	6,153	47.38%	681	5.24%	12,987
Canadian	7,289	63.43%	4,203	36.57%	3,086	26.86%	11,492
Carter	5,974	36.76%	10,276	63.24%	-4,302	-26.48%	16,250
Cherokee	3,326	50.70%	3,234	49.30%	92	1.40%	6,560
Choctaw	2,251	34.57%	4,260	65.43%	-2,009	-30.86%	6,511
Cimarron	1,438	67.10%	705	32.90%	733	34.20%	2,143
Cleveland	8,149	56.83%	6,190	43.17%	1,959	13.66%	14,339
Coal	1,106	38.66%	1,755	61.34%	-649	-22.68%	2,861
Comanche	8,756	49.23%	9,029	50.77%	-273	-1.54%	17,785
Cotton	1,897	47.26%	2,117	52.74%	-220	-5.48%	4,014
Craig	3,830	54.99%	3,135	45.01%	695	9.98%	6,965
Creek	9,257	51.21%	8,818	48.79%	439	2.42%	18,075
Custer	5,667	63.72%	3,226	36.28%	2,441	27.44%	8,893
Delaware	3,399	55.86%	2,686	44.14%	713	11.72%	6,085
Dewey	2,583	66.85%	1,281	33.15%	1,302	33.70%	3,864
Ellis	2,583	78.27%	717	21.73%	1,866	56.54%	3,300
Garfield	17,589	71.40%	7,047	28.60%	10,542	42.80%	24,636
Garvin	4,402	39.14%	6,844	60.86%	-2,442	-21.72%	11,246
Grady	6,348	45.16%	7,710	54.84%	-1,362	-9.68%	14,058
Grant	3,996	72.43%	1,521	27.57%	2,475	44.86%	5,517
Greer	2,147	48.05%	2,321	51.95%	-174	-3.90%	4,468
Harmon	1,057	35.70%	1,904	64.30%	-847	-28.60%	2,961
Harper	2,057	73.65%	736	26.35%	1,321	47.30%	2,793
Haskell	1,872	41.68%	2,619	58.32%	-747	-16.64%	4,491
Hughes	3,012	39.37%	4,639	60.63%	-1,627	-21.26%	7,651
Jackson	2,627	34.80%	4,921	65.20%	-2,294	-30.40%	7,548
Jefferson	1,384	32.52%	2,872	67.48%	-1,488	-34.96%	4,256
Johnston	1,349	35.09%	2,495	64.91%	-1,146	-29.82%	3,844
Kay	16,460	66.26%	8,382	33.74%	8,078	32.52%	24,842
Kingfisher	4,873	76.96%	1,459	23.04%	3,414	53.92%	6,332
Kiowa	4,100	54.03%	3,489	45.97%	611	8.06%	7,589
Latimer	1,668	42.22%	2,283	57.78%	-615	-15.56%	3,951
LeFlore	4,631	42.18%	6,349	57.82%	-1,718	-15.64%	10,980
Lincoln	5,778	58.67%	4,071	41.33%	1,707	17.34%	9,849
Logan	6,172	64.18%	3,444	35.82%	2,728	28.36%	9,616
Love	806	29.01%	1,972	70.99%	-1,166	-41.98%	2,778
Major	3,495	80.53%	845	19.47%	2,650	61.06%	4,340
Marshall	1,204	34.48%	2,288	65.52%	-1,084	-31.04%	3,492
Mayes	4,704	55.08%	3,837	44.92%	867	10.16%	8,541
McClain	2,326	42.08%	3,201	57.92%	-875	-15.84%	5,527
McCurtain	2,748	32.17%	5,793	67.83%	-3,045	-35.66%	8,541
McIntosh	2,295	43.29%	3,007	56.71%	-712	-13.42%	5,302
Murray	1,885	39.66%	2,868	60.34%	-983	-20.68%	4,753
Muskogee	11,810	47.53%	13,040	52.47%	-1,230	-4.94%	24,850
Noble	4,422	71.04%	1,803	28.96%	2,619	42.08%	6,225
Nowata	3,226	54.84%	2,657	45.16%	569	9.68%	5,883
Okfuskee	2,469	47.08%	2,775	52.92%	-306	-5.84%	5,244
Oklahoma	95,492	57.63%	70,199	42.37%	25,293	15.26%	165,691
Okmulgee	6,717	39.91%	10,115	60.09%	-3,398	-20.18%	16,832
Osage	7,731	53.52%	6,714	46.48%	1,017	7.04%	14,445
Ottawa	7,211	51.87%	6,692	48.13%	519	3.74%	13,903
Pawnee	3,975	63.61%	2,274	36.39%	1,701	27.22%	6,249
Payne	10,605	62.04%	6,490	37.96%	4,115	24.08%	17,095
Pittsburg	5,909	38.23%	9,546	61.77%	-3,637	-23.54%	15,455
Pontotoc	5,389	42.78%	7,208	57.22%	-1,819	-14.44%	12,597
Pottawatomie	10,099	51.65%	9,455	48.35%	644	3.30%	19,554
Pushmataha	1,640	38.88%	2,578	61.12%	-938	-22.24%	4,218
Roger Mills	1,667	52.99%	1,479	47.01%	188	5.98%	3,146
Rogers	4,873	55.99%	3,830	44.01%	1,043	11.98%	8,703
Seminole	6,668	48.52%	7,076	51.48%	-408	-2.96%	13,744
Sequoyah	3,288	44.67%	4,072	55.33%	-784	-10.66%	7,360
Stephens	6,461	44.59%	8,029	55.41%	-1,568	-10.82%	14,490
Texas	4,196	68.66%	1,915	31.34%	2,281	37.32%	6,111
Tillman	2,657	42.20%	3,639	57.80%	-982	-15.60%	6,296
Tulsa	73,862	61.25%	46,728	38.75%	27,134	22.50%	120,590
Wagoner	3,321	52.82%	2,966	47.18%	355	5.64%	6,287
Washington	11,334	64.50%	6,238	35.50%	5,096	29.00%	17,572
Washita	3,914	55.20%	3,177	44.80%	737	10.40%	7,091
Woods	4,892	70.99%	1,999	29.01%	2,893	41.98%	6,891
Woodward	4,463	72.53%	1,690	27.47%	2,773	45.06%	6,153
Totals	518,045	54.59%	430,939	45.41%	87,106	9.18%	948,984

==== Counties that flipped from Democratic to Republican ====
- Adair
- Beaver
- Beckham
- Caddo
- Canadian
- Cherokee
- Cleveland
- Cimarron
- Custer
- Craig
- Creek
- Delaware
- Dewey
- Harper
- Kay
- Kiowa
- Lincoln
- Logan
- Mayes
- Nowata
- Noble
- Oklahoma
- Osage
- Ottawa
- Pawnee
- Payne
- Pottawatomie
- Roger Mills
- Rogers
- Texas
- Woods
- Wagoner
- Washita

== See also ==
- United States presidential elections in Oklahoma
