= National Register of Historic Places listings in Noble County, Oklahoma =

Location of Noble County in Oklahoma

This is a list of the National Register of Historic Places listings in Noble County, Oklahoma.

This is intended to be a complete list of the properties and districts on the National Register of Historic Places in Noble County, Oklahoma, United States. The locations of National Register properties and districts for which the latitude and longitude coordinates are included below, may be seen in a map.

There are 14 properties and districts listed on the National Register in the county.

This National Park Service list is complete through NPS recent listings posted May 29, 2026.

== Current listings ==
	Name on the Register	Image	Date listed	Location	City or town	Description
1	First National Bank and Trust Company Building	First National Bank and Trust Company Building	May 16, 1979 (#79002003)	300 N. 6th St. 36°17′10″N 97°17′07″W	Perry	
2	Kerr Homestead Dugout		June 4, 2026 (#100013089)	Address Restricted; 36°17′10″N 97°17′07″W	Morrison vicinity	
3	Morrison Baptist Church	Morrison Baptist Church	September 28, 1984 (#84003357)	202 3rd St. 36°17′55″N 97°00′27″W	Morrison	
4	Morrison Suspension Bridge		May 23, 1980 (#80003277)	East of Morrison off U.S. Route 64; 36°18′30″N 96°57′05″W	Morrison	Destroyed
5	Noble County Courthouse	Noble County Courthouse	August 23, 1984 (#84003361)	Courthouse Square; 36°17′12″N 97°17′11″W	Perry	
6	Perry Armory	Perry Armory	September 8, 1988 (#88001362)	Delaware and 14th Sts. 36°17′13″N 97°17′57″W	Perry	
7	Perry Courthouse Square Historic District	Perry Courthouse Square Historic District	September 2, 2003 (#03000881)	Roughly bounded by Birch, Elm, 6th and 7th 36°17′13″N 97°17′13″W	Perry	
8	Perry Lake Park	Perry Lake Park	June 1, 2007 (#07000523)	1520 S. 4th St. 36°16′01″N 97°16′41″W	Perry	
9	Rein School	Rein School	September 8, 1988 (#88001361)	Off U.S. Route 177; 36°33′55″N 97°04′07″W	Ponca City vicinity	
10	Renfrow Building	Renfrow Building	September 28, 1984 (#84003365)	127 W. Main St. 36°31′42″N 97°26′41″W	Billings	No longer extant per Google Street View.
11	Renfrow House	Renfrow House	September 28, 1984 (#84003373)	Graves St. and Broadway; 36°31′39″N 97°26′43″W	Billings	
12	Schultz-Neal Stone Barn		December 7, 2020 (#100005861)	250 yds. east of US 177/OK 15, 7 miles (11 km) southeast of Red Rock; 36°25′35″N 97°04′04″W	Red Rock vicinity	
13	Sumner School	Sumner School	April 26, 1996 (#96000492)	County Road N3300, 2 miles north of U.S. Route 64; 36°19′06″N 97°07′21″W	Morrison	
14	Wolleson-Nicewander Building	Wolleson-Nicewander Building	May 16, 1979 (#79002004)	615 Delaware St. 36°17′15″N 97°17′12″W	Perry	

== See also ==
- List of National Historic Landmarks in Oklahoma
- National Register of Historic Places listings in Oklahoma
