= Noble County, Oklahoma =

County in Oklahoma, United States

- County
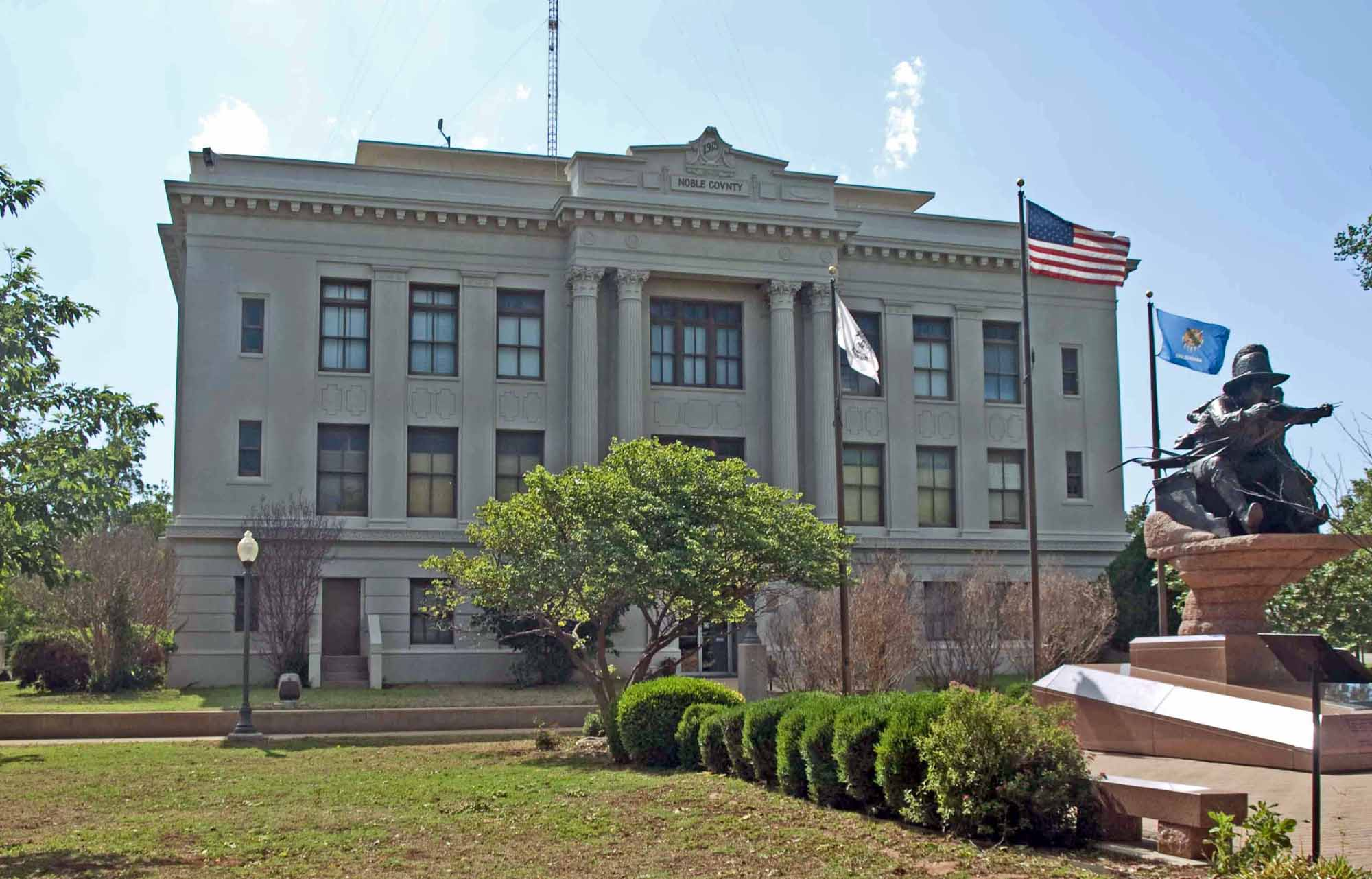
- Noble County Courthouse

- Location within the U.S. state of Oklahoma
- Coordinates: 36°23′N 97°14′W
- Country: United States
- State: Oklahoma
- Founded: 1893
- Named for: John Willock Noble
- Seat: Perry
- Largest city: Perry

Area
  - Total: 743 sq mi (1,920 km^{2})
  - Land: 732 sq mi (1,900 km^{2})
  - Water: 11 sq mi (28 km^{2}) 1.4%

Population (2020)
  - Total: 10,924
  - Estimate (2025): 10,899 ▼
  - Density: 14.9/sq mi (5.76/km^{2})
- Congressional district: 3rd
- Website: www.noblecountyok.com

Noble County is a county located in the north-central part of Oklahoma. As of the 2020 census, its population was 10,924. Its county seat is Perry. It was part of the Cherokee Outlet in Indian Territory until Oklahoma Territory was created in 1890, and the present county land was designated as County P. After the U.S. government opened the area to non-Indian settlement in 1893, it was renamed Noble County for John Willock Noble, then the United States secretary of the interior.

== History ==
During the 18th and 19th centuries, the area now occupied by Noble County was used as a hunting ground by the Osage Indians. In 1835, a treaty with the Cherokees made it part of the so-called Cherokee Outlet. During the time of Cherokee ownership, non-native cattlemen who belonged to the Cherokee Strip Live Stock Association leased grazing land from the tribe. Later, reservations were created in the northeastern part of the county for the Otoe and Ponca tribes. These reservations existed until 1904, when the lands were allotted and added to Noble County.

The Cherokee Outlet became part of Oklahoma Territory at the time of the Oklahoma Organic Act and was divided into counties. After the 1893 opening of the Cherokee Outlet for settlement by non-Indians, the land was divided into counties. One county, originally designated as County P, was renamed in honor of John W. Noble, U.S. interior secretary in 1893. The town of Perry was laid out in August 1893 as the county seat and land-office town

Oklahoma City bomber Timothy McVeigh was arrested in Noble County on April 19, 1995, heading north-bound on Interstate 35. McVeigh was stopped for not having a license tag on his car. He was minutes from being released when the Noble County Sheriff's Department was notified to hold McVeigh. McVeigh was tried and convicted for the bombing attack that killed 168 persons and injured many more. He was executed in 2001. McVeigh's arresting officer, Charlie Hanger, was elected Noble County Sheriff in 2004.

In 2010, the Keystone-Cushing Pipeline (Phase II) was constructed north to south through Noble County.

== Geography ==
According to the U.S. Census Bureau, the county has a total area of 743 square miles (1,920 km^{2}), of which 11 square miles (28 km^{2}) (1.4%) are covered by water. The Arkansas River forms part of the county's northeastern boundary. Two of its tributaries, Red Rock Creek in the north and Black Bear Creek in the south, drain the county watershed before emptying into the Arkansas River.

=== Major highways ===
- Interstate 35
- U.S. Highway 64
- U.S. Highway 77
- U.S. Highway 177
- U.S. Highway 412
- Cimarron Turnpike
- State Highway 15
- State Highway 86
- State Highway 108
- State Highway 156
- State Highway 164

=== Adjacent counties ===
- Kay County (north)
- Osage County (northeast)
- Pawnee County (east)
- Payne County (south)
- Logan County (southwest)
- Garfield County (west)

== Demographics ==
Historical population
Census	Pop.	Note	%±
1900	11,798		—
1910	14,945		26.7%
1920	13,560		−9.3%
1930	15,139		11.6%
1940	14,826		−2.1%
1950	12,156		−18.0%
1960	10,376		−14.6%
1970	10,043		−3.2%
1980	11,573		15.2%
1990	11,045		−4.6%
2000	11,411		3.3%
2010	11,561		1.3%
2020	10,924		−5.5%
2025 (est.)	10,899	▼	−0.2%
U.S. Decennial Census; 1790-1960 1900-1990; 1990-2000 2010

=== 2020 census ===
As of the 2020 census, the county had a population of 10,924. Of the residents, 23.4% were under 18 and 20.3% were 65 or older; the median age was 42.6 years. For every 100 females, there were 98.4 males, and for every 100 females 18 and over, there were 97.3 males.

The racial makeup of the county was 78.4% White, 1.4% Black or African American, 9.0% American Indian and Alaska Native, 0.4% Asian, 0.9% from some other race, and 9.8% from two or more races. Hispanic or Latino residents of any race comprised 3.8% of the population.

Of the 4,353 households in the county, 31.9% had children under 18 living with them, and 23.7% had a female householder with no spouse or partner present. About 27.1% of all households were made up of individuals, and 13.6% had someone living alone who was 65 or older.

The county had 5,057 housing units, of which 13.9% were vacant. Among occupied housing units, 75.8% were owner-occupied and 24.2% were renter-occupied. The homeowner vacancy rate was 2.7% and the rental vacancy rate was 9.9%.

=== 2000 census ===
As of the 2000 census, 11,411 people, 4,504 households, and 3,211 families resided in the county. The population density was 6/km^{2} (16/mi^{2}). The 5,082 housing units had an average density of 3/km^{2} (7.8/mi^{2}). The racial makeup of the county was 86.44% White, 1.58% Black or African American, 7.57% Native American, 0.33% Asian, 0.03% Pacific Islander, 0.65% from other races, and 3.40% from two or more races. About 1.80% of the population were Hispanic or Latino people of any race.

Of the 4,504 households, 32.0% had children under 18 living with them, 59.0% were married couples living together, 8.4% had a female householder with no husband present, and 28.7% were not families. About 25.5% of all households were made up of individuals, and 11.2% had someone living alone who was 65 or older. The average household size was 2.47, and the average family size was 2.97.

In the county, the age distribution was 25.5% under 18, 7.9% from 18 to 24, 27.5% from 25 to 44, 23.9% from 45 to 64, and 15.2% who were 65 or older. The median age was 38 years. For every 100 females, there were 97.4 males. For every 100 females 18 and over, there were 96.0 males.

The median income in the county for a household was $33,968 and for a family was $40,180. Males had a median income of $32,224 versus $21,235 for females. The per capita income for the county was $17,022. About 9.6% of families and 12.8% of the population were below the poverty line, including 16.4% of those under 18 and 11.0% of those 65 or over.

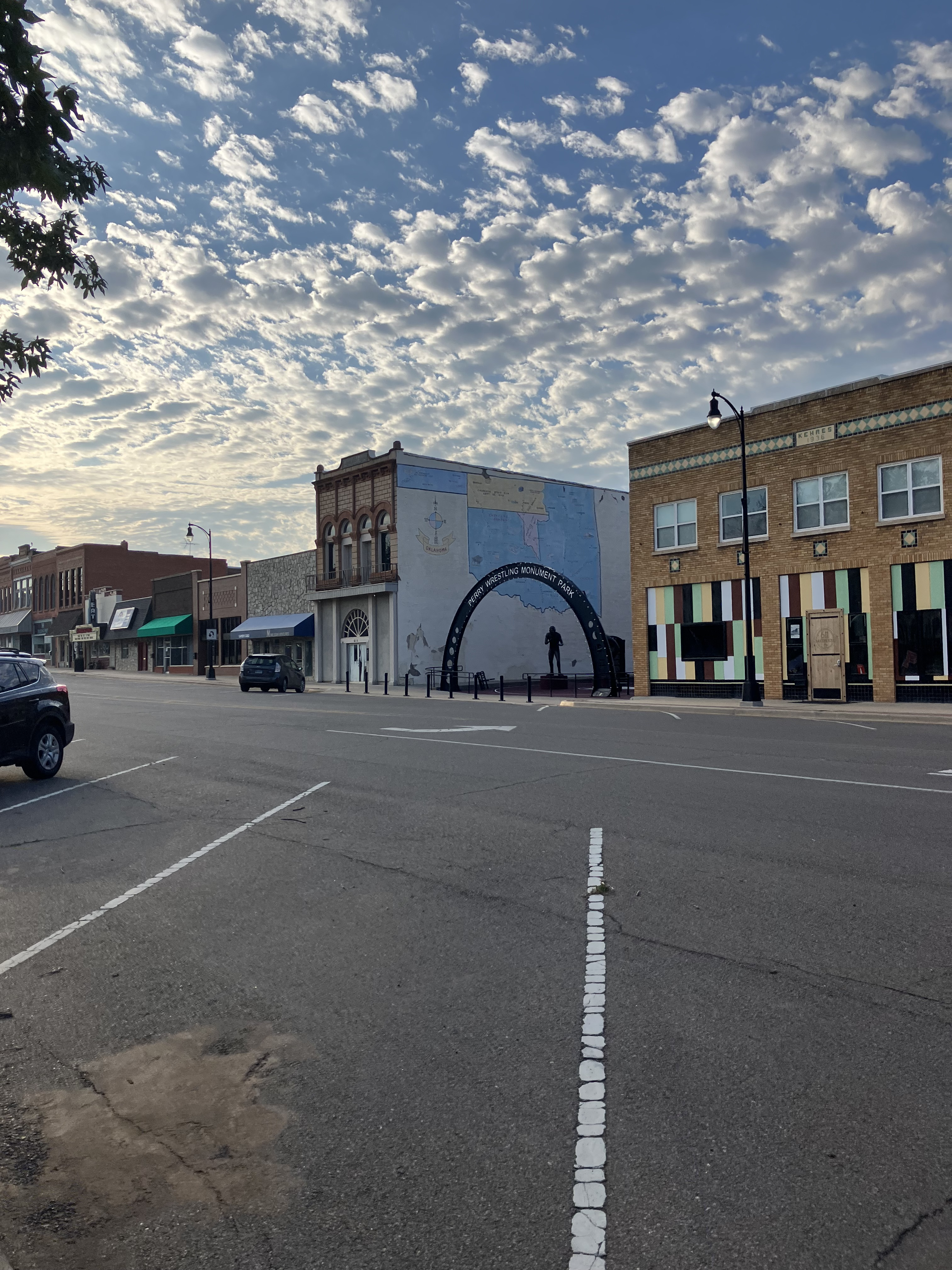
Downtown Perry

== Politics ==
Noble County is reliably Republican. In only five elections since 1908 (out of 30) has the Democratic nominee carried the county, and no Democrat carried it after 1964.

Voter Registration and Party Enrollment as of June 30, 2023
Party	Number of Voters	Percentage
Democratic	1,377	20.68%
Republican	4,364	65.54%
Others	918	13.79%
Total	6,659	100%

United States presidential election results for Noble County, Oklahoma
Year	Republican		Democratic		Third party(ies)	
Year	No.	%	No.	%	No.	%
1908	1,476	49.71%	1,364	45.94%	129	4.34%
1912	1,266	46.15%	1,188	43.31%	289	10.54%
1916	1,243	44.03%	1,346	47.68%	234	8.29%
1920	2,467	59.69%	1,515	36.66%	151	3.65%
1924	2,680	51.15%	1,927	36.77%	633	12.08%
1928	3,607	66.21%	1,777	32.62%	64	1.17%
1932	1,635	27.03%	4,414	72.97%	0	0.00%
1936	2,461	38.60%	3,901	61.19%	13	0.20%
1940	3,441	51.56%	3,226	48.34%	7	0.10%
1944	3,060	56.95%	2,300	42.81%	13	0.24%
1948	2,430	46.73%	2,770	53.27%	0	0.00%
1952	4,422	71.04%	1,803	28.96%	0	0.00%
1956	3,536	63.68%	2,017	36.32%	0	0.00%
1960	3,198	62.61%	1,910	37.39%	0	0.00%
1964	2,157	44.29%	2,713	55.71%	0	0.00%
1968	2,911	58.92%	1,412	28.58%	618	12.51%
1972	4,085	78.38%	999	19.17%	128	2.46%
1976	2,634	53.05%	2,278	45.88%	53	1.07%
1980	3,663	69.90%	1,398	26.68%	179	3.42%
1984	4,018	76.11%	1,238	23.45%	23	0.44%
1988	3,015	63.80%	1,661	35.15%	50	1.06%
1992	2,474	46.83%	1,333	25.23%	1,476	27.94%
1996	2,318	48.38%	1,756	36.65%	717	14.97%
2000	3,230	68.77%	1,416	30.15%	51	1.09%
2004	3,993	74.94%	1,335	25.06%	0	0.00%
2008	3,881	76.78%	1,174	23.22%	0	0.00%
2012	3,488	75.32%	1,143	24.68%	0	0.00%
2016	3,715	76.16%	901	18.47%	262	5.37%
2020	3,821	77.38%	1,003	20.31%	114	2.31%
2024	3,853	77.73%	1,009	20.36%	95	1.92%

== Economy ==
The county economy has largely been based on agriculture - row crops and cattle. Wheat was the major crop, although alfalfa, oats, corn, and barley have also been important. The county lies in the Mid-Continent oil and gas region. Natural gas wells began producing in 1915–1919. Oil production began in the 1920s.

Ditch Witch, a Charles Machine Works company, is headquartered in Perry, the county seat.

== Communities ==
=== City ===
- Perry (county seat)

=== Towns ===
- Billings
- Marland
- Morrison
- Red Rock

=== Census-designated places ===
- Lucien
- Sumner

=== Other unincorporated places ===
- Ceres
- Gansel
- Otoe

== Historic sites ==
These sites in Noble County are listed on the National Register of Historic Places:

- First National Bank and Trust Company Building, Perry
- Morrison Baptist Church, Morrison
- Morrison Suspension Bridge, Morrison
- Noble County Courthouse, Perry
- Perry Armory, Perry
- Perry Courthouse Square Historic District, Perry
- Perry Lake Park, Perry
- Rein School, Ponca City vicinity
- Renfrow Building, Billings
- Renfrow House, Billings
- Sumner School, Morrison
- Wolleson-Nicewander Building, Perry
