= First National Bank and Trust Building =

First National Bank and Trust Building or First National Bank and Trust Company Building may refer to:

- First National Bank and Trust Company Building (Flint, Michigan), listed on the National Register of Historic Places in Genesee County, Michigan
- First National Bank and Trust Building (Lima, Ohio), listed on the National Register of Historic Places in Allen County, Ohio
- First National Bank and Trust Company Building (Perry, Oklahoma), listed on the National Register of Historic Places in Noble County, Oklahoma
- First National Bank and Trust Building (Bryan, Texas), listed on the National Register of Historic Places in Brazos County, Texas
