= Sumner, Oklahoma =

- Unincorporated community
- Location within the state of Oklahoma Sumner, Oklahoma (the United States)
- Coordinates: 36°19′8″N 97°7′17″W
- Country: United States
- State: Oklahoma
- County: Noble

Area
  - Total: 0.15 sq mi (0.38 km^{2})
  - Land: 0.15 sq mi (0.38 km^{2})
  - Water: 0 sq mi (0.00 km^{2})
- Elevation: 938 ft (286 m)

Population (2020)
  - Total: 35
  - Density: 240.5/sq mi (92.87/km^{2})
- Time zone: UTC-6 (Central (CST))
  - Summer (DST): UTC-5 (CDT)
- FIPS code: 40-71500
- GNIS feature ID: 2812860

Sumner is an unincorporated community and census-designated place located in Noble County, Oklahoma, United States, ten miles east of Perry and two miles north of U.S. Route 64. Established prior to statehood along the St. Louis-San Francisco Railway, the post office opened on May 23, 1894. The town was named for Henry T. Sumner, a businessman from Perry. Per the 1905 Oklahoma Territorial Census, Sumner had sixty-four residents. The post office closed July 27, 1957.

As of the 2020 census, Sumner had a population of 35. At its peak the town had a bank, post office, two churches, a school, a grain elevator, and a train stop. Currently, the only significant buildings still in use are the Baptist church, the Christian church and the school.

== Demographics ==
=== 2020 census ===
As of the 2020 census, Sumner had a population of 35. The median age was 37.5 years. 22.9% of residents were under the age of 18 and 22.9% of residents were 65 years of age or older. For every 100 females there were 66.7 males, and for every 100 females age 18 and over there were 50.0 males age 18 and over.

0.0% of residents lived in urban areas, while 100.0% lived in rural areas.

There were 13 households in Sumner, of which 38.5% had children under the age of 18 living in them. Of all households, 84.6% were married-couple households, 15.4% were households with a male householder and no spouse or partner present, and 0.0% were households with a female householder and no spouse or partner present. About 15.4% of all households were made up of individuals and 0.0% had someone living alone who was 65 years of age or older.

There were 14 housing units, of which 7.1% were vacant. The homeowner vacancy rate was 0.0% and the rental vacancy rate was 0.0%.

Racial composition as of the 2020 census
Race	Number	Percent
White	25	71.4%
Black or African American	0	0.0%
American Indian and Alaska Native	4	11.4%
Asian	0	0.0%
Native Hawaiian and Other Pacific Islander	0	0.0%
Some other race	2	5.7%
Two or more races	4	11.4%
Hispanic or Latino (of any race)	4	11.4%
