= Oklahoma State Highway 86 =

State highway in Oklahoma, United States

State Highway 86

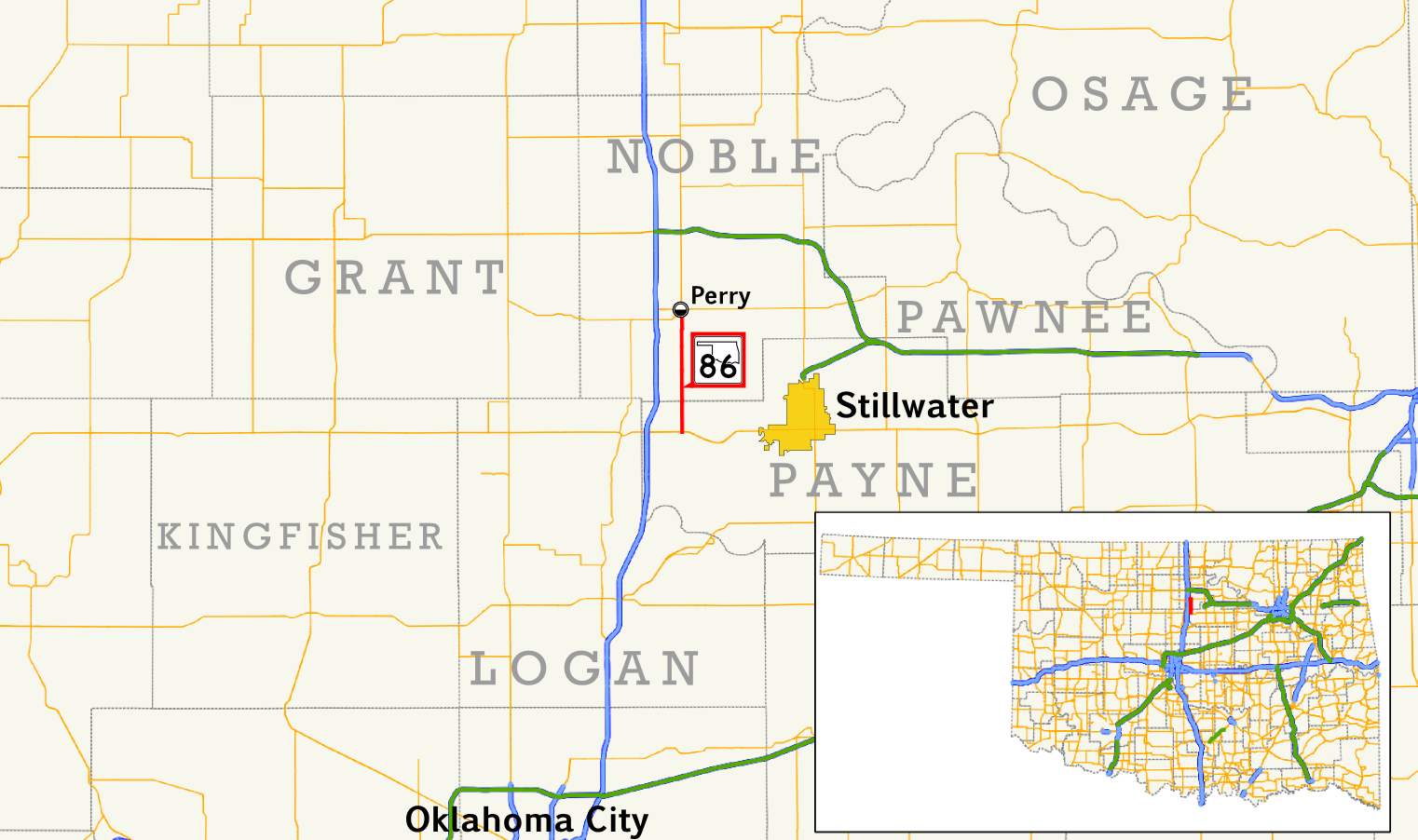

Route information
- Maintained by ODOT
- Length: 12.06 mi (19.41 km)
- Existed: 1940–present

Major junctions
- South end: SH-51 west of Stillwater
- North end: US 77 in Perry

Location
- Country: United States
- State: Oklahoma

Highway system
- Oklahoma State Highway System; Interstate; US; State; Turnpikes
← SH-85	→ SH-87

State Highway 86 (abbreviated SH-86) is a state highway in the U.S. state of Oklahoma that connects SH-51 with Perry and is 12.06 miles (19.41 km) long. The highway is contained wholly in Payne and Noble Counties. SH-86 has no lettered spurs or loops.

SH-86 was established in 1940. Initially a gravel highway, it remained unpaved until 1952.

== Route description ==
SH-86 begins at SH-51 in western Payne County, approximately 3 1/2 miles (5.6 km) east of Interstate 35. From this intersection, SH-86 heads north, crossing Stillwater Creek, just west of where it expands to form Lake Carl Blackwell, around two miles (3.2 km) north of SH-51. SH-86 crosses into Noble County 3.01 miles (4.84 km) into its journey. In Noble County, the highway mostly follows a due north course, except for a slight curve approximately two miles (3.2 km) south of Perry. The route passes just west of Lake Perry. Shortly thereafter, SH-86 comes to an end in Perry at US-77.

== History ==
State Highway 86 first appears on the official Oklahoma highway map on the 1941 edition. Originally, the driving surface consisted of untreated gravel. The route had the same extent and termini as the present-day highway. By 1953, the highway had been paved.

== Junction list ==
County	Location	mi	km	Destinations	Notes
Payne		0.00	0.00	SH-51	Southern terminus
Noble	Perry	12.06	19.41	US 77	Northern terminus
1.000 mi = 1.609 km; 1.000 km = 0.621 mi
