= Lucien, Oklahoma =

- Census-designated place & Unincorporated community
- Location within Oklahoma Location within the United States
- Coordinates: 36°16′29″N 97°27′18″W
- Country: United States
- State: Oklahoma
- County: Noble

Area
  - Total: 0.55 sq mi (1.42 km^{2})
  - Land: 0.55 sq mi (1.42 km^{2})
  - Water: 0 sq mi (0.00 km^{2})
- Elevation: 1,119 ft (341 m)

Population (2020)
  - Total: 66
  - Density: 120.7/sq mi (46.61/km^{2})
- Time zone: UTC-6 (Central (CST))
  - Summer (DST): UTC-5 (CDT)
- ZIP code: 73757
- Area code: 580
- GNIS feature ID: 2629930

Lucien is a census-designated place (CDP) and unincorporated community in Noble County, Oklahoma, United States. As of the 2020 census, Lucien had a population of 66.

== Demographics ==
Historical population
Census	Pop.	Note	%±
2020	66		—
U.S. Decennial Census

=== 2020 census ===
As of the 2020 census, Lucien had a population of 66. The median age was 61.0 years. 6.1% of residents were under the age of 18 and 39.4% of residents were 65 years of age or older. For every 100 females there were 100.0 males, and for every 100 females age 18 and over there were 100.0 males age 18 and over.

0.0% of residents lived in urban areas, while 100.0% lived in rural areas.

There were 33 households in Lucien, of which 6.1% had children under the age of 18 living in them. Of all households, 51.5% were married-couple households, 30.3% were households with a male householder and no spouse or partner present, and 18.2% were households with a female householder and no spouse or partner present. About 27.3% of all households were made up of individuals and 21.2% had someone living alone who was 65 years of age or older.

There were 43 housing units, of which 23.3% were vacant. The homeowner vacancy rate was 0.0% and the rental vacancy rate was 100.0%.

Racial composition as of the 2020 census
Race	Number	Percent
White	61	92.4%
Black or African American	0	0.0%
American Indian and Alaska Native	0	0.0%
Asian	0	0.0%
Native Hawaiian and Other Pacific Islander	0	0.0%
Some other race	0	0.0%
Two or more races	5	7.6%
Hispanic or Latino (of any race)	2	3.0%
