= Ditch Witch =

Brand of trencher machines

The Charles Machine Works, Inc.
- Type: Subsidiary
- Industry: Construction equipment
- Founded: Perry, Oklahoma, U.S. (1902)
- Founder: Edwin Malzahn (July 3, 1921 – December 11, 2015)
- Headquarters: Perry, Oklahoma, U.S.
- Products: Trenchers, Directional Drilling Machines
- Parent: The Toro Company
- Website: ditchwitch.com

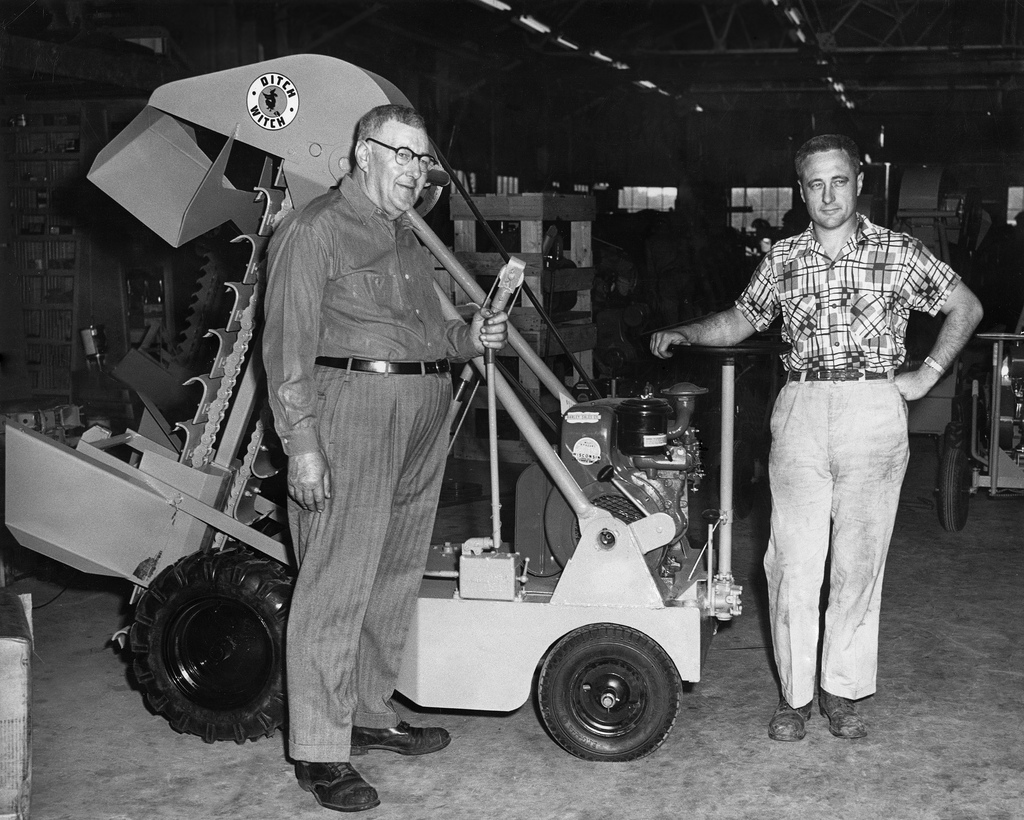
Charlie and Ed Malzahn with an early Ditch Witch.

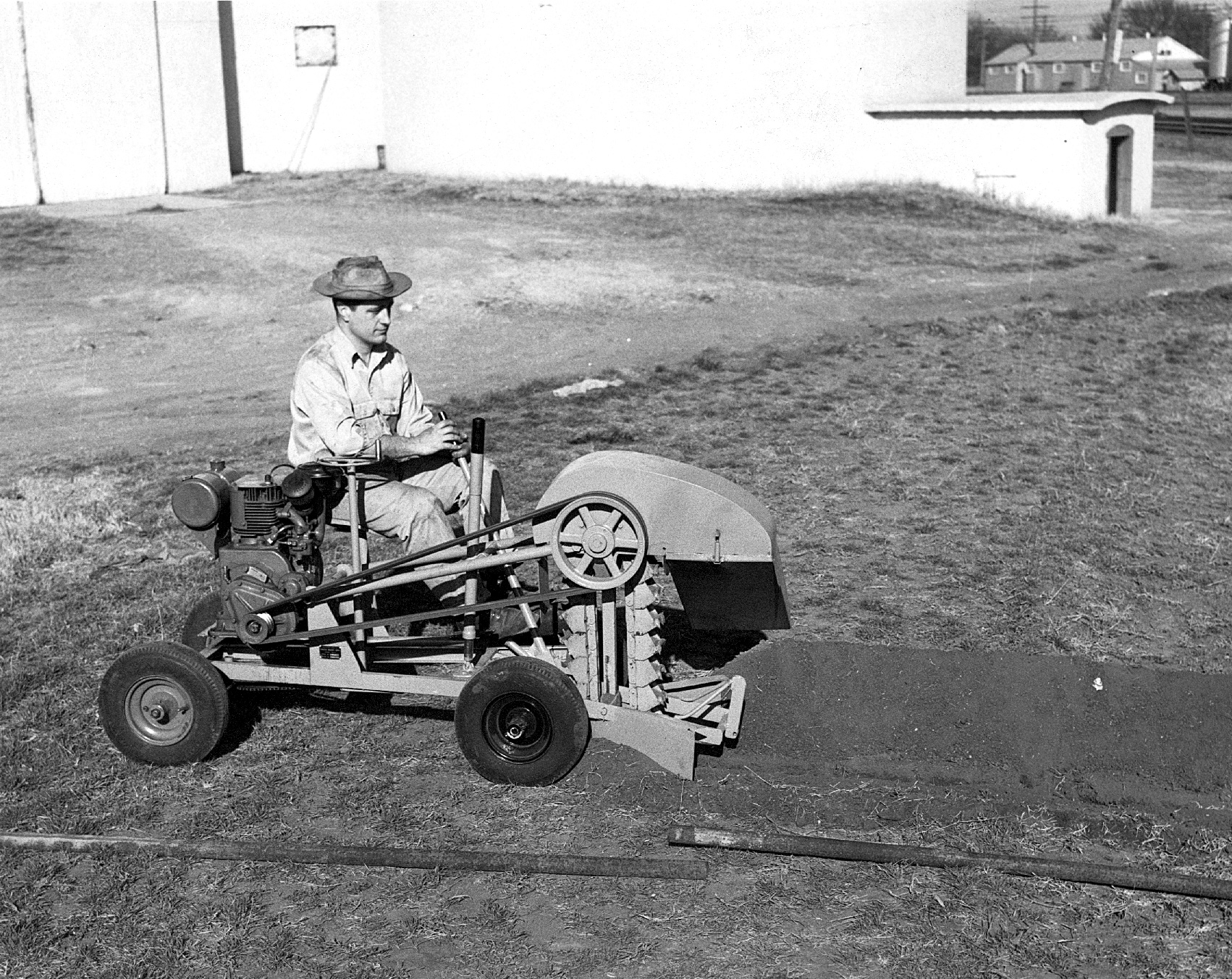
Ed Malzahn riding an early Ditch Witch trencher.

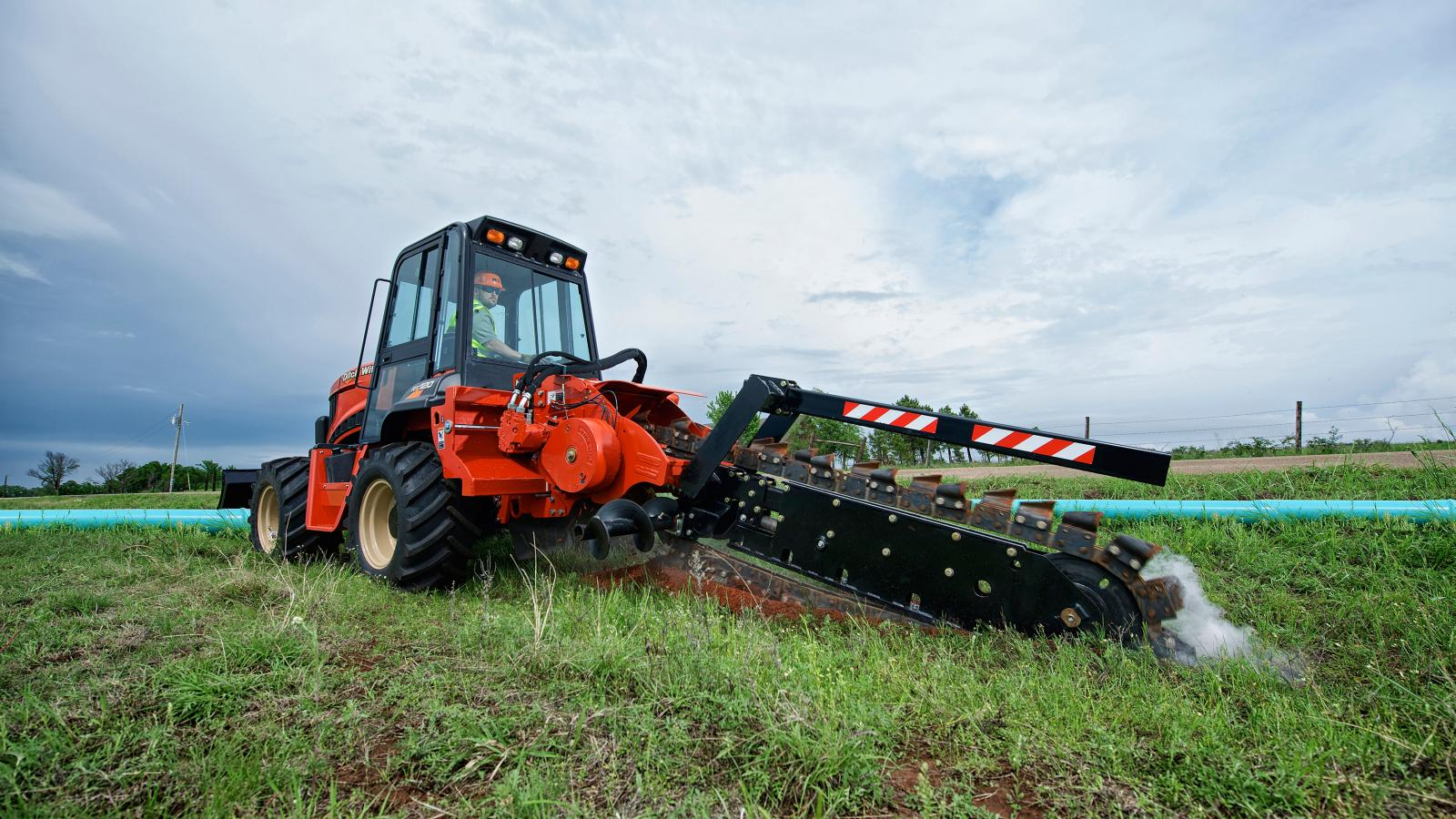
The Ditch Witch RT120 Ride-On Trencher

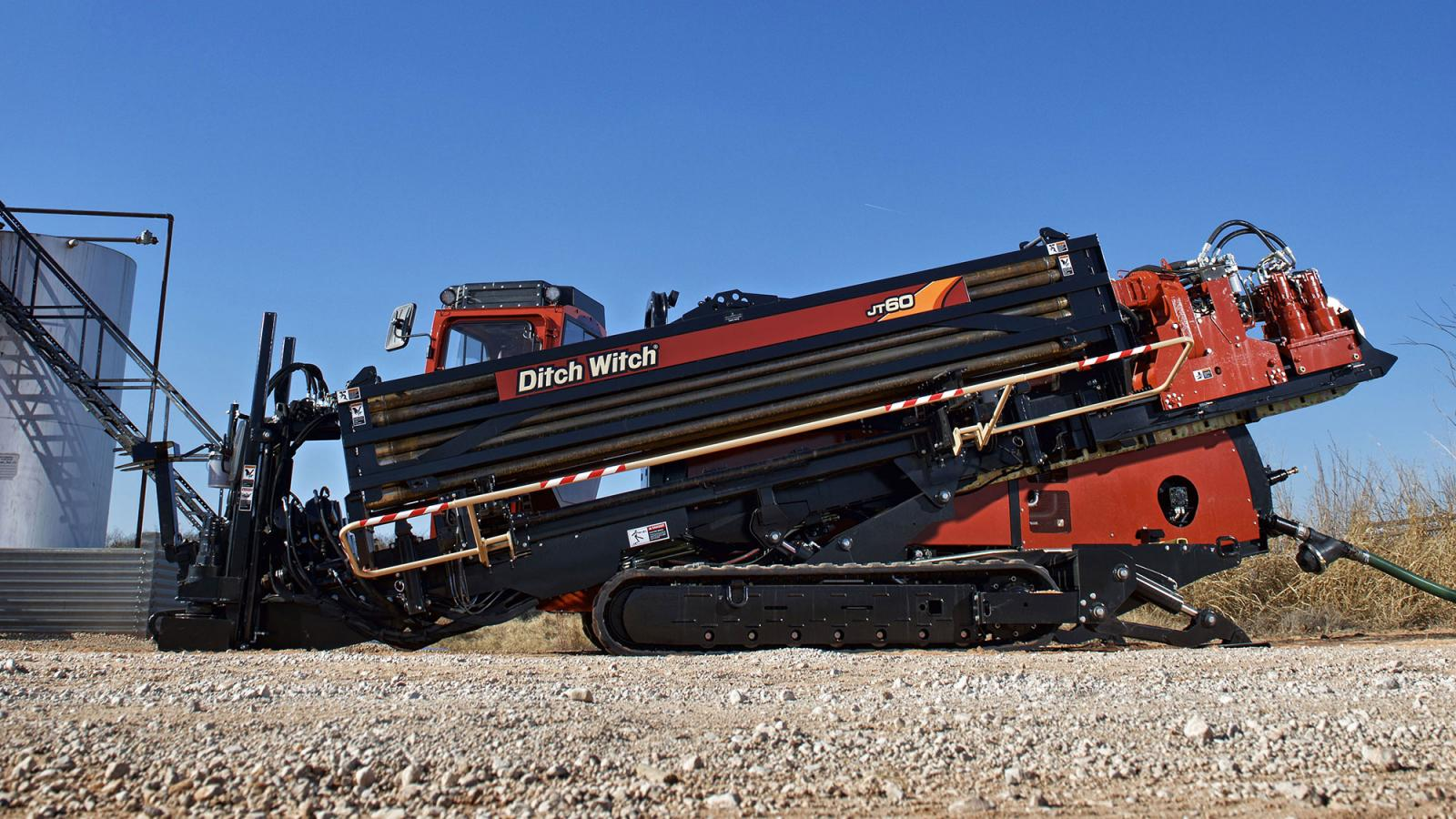
Ditch Witch JT60 Horizontal Directional Drill

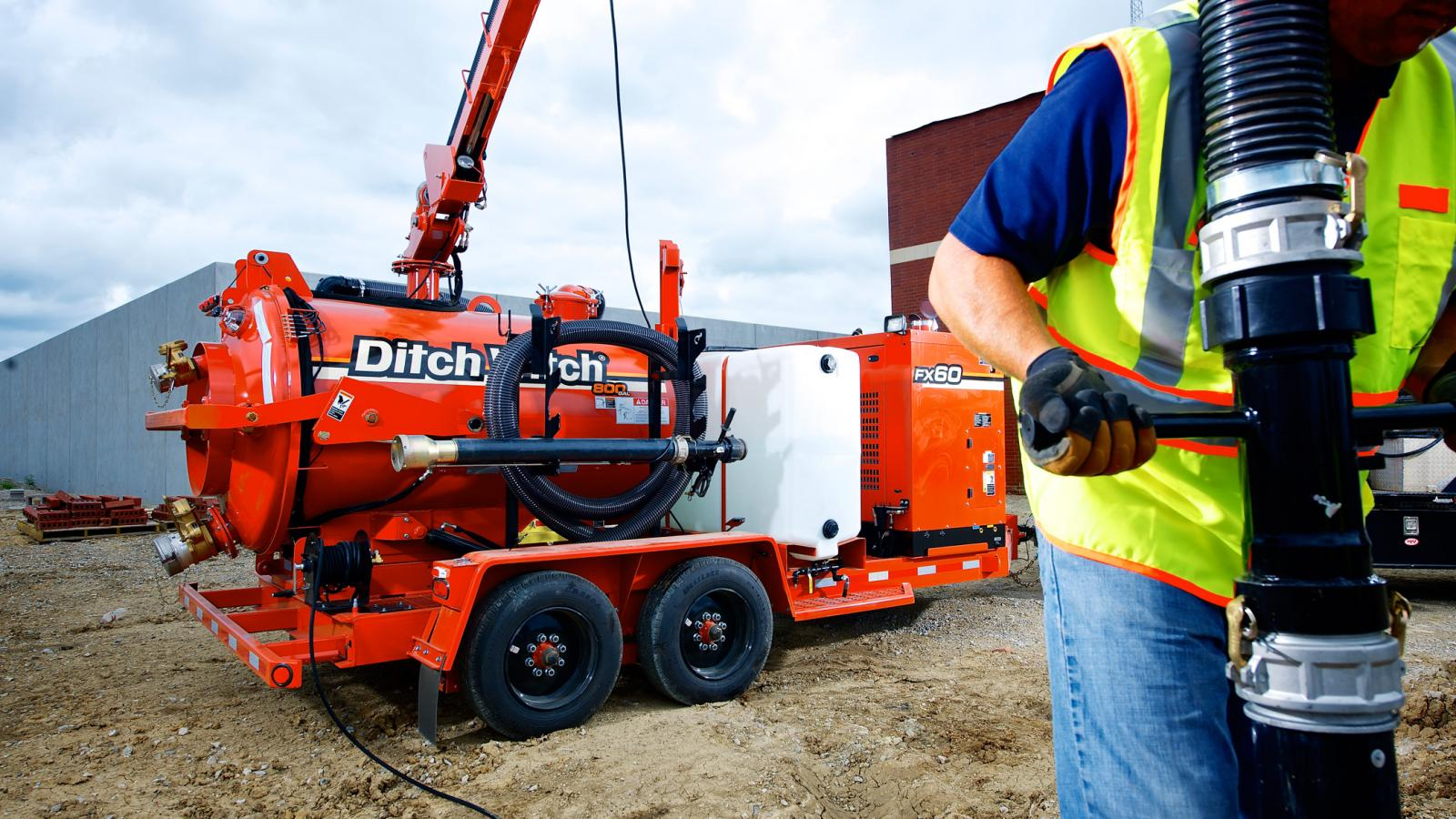
The Ditch Witch FX60 Vacuum Excavator

Ditch Witch, a trade name of Charles Machine Works, is an American brand of underground utility construction equipment, principally trenchers, which has been in operation since 1949. It is the leading subsidiary of Charles Machine Works, headquartered in Perry, Oklahoma. Charles Machine Works has been, since 2019, a subsidiary of The Toro Company.

Innovation of Ditch Witch machines started in the 1940s when a compact trenching machine was created to replace the pick and shovel for installation of underground residential utility services.

The Ditch Witch organization specializes in the design and manufacture of underground construction equipment. The company is a source for trenchers, vibratory plows, horizontal directional drilling systems, drill pipe, downhole tools, vacuum excavation systems, fluid management systems, and mini skid steers. Because of its extensive experience in the construction of subterranean structures and systems, CMW and Ditch Witch have been called, "The Underground Authority."

== History ==
In 1902, Carl Frederick Malzahn, a German immigrant seeking to escape the harsh winters of Minnesota, moved his family to Perry, Oklahoma, and opened the Malzahn Blacksmith Shop with his sons, Charlie and Gus. The sons took over the business in 1913 and renamed it Malzahn Brothers' General Blacksmithing. The business prospered, and several years later, with the advent of an oil boom, it began specializing in repairs for the nearby oil fields. After Gus died in 1928, Charlie renamed the business Charlie's Machine Shop. In 1944, Charlie persuaded his son, Edwin "Ed" Malzahn (July 3, 1921 – December 11, 2015), by then an Oklahoma A&M (now Oklahoma State)-trained mechanical engineer, to join the business.

== Compact trencher development ==
In the late 1940s, Malzahn began to apply his mechanical engineering knowledge to inventing a device that he believed would be in great demand, once it was produced. At the time, the process of installing residential utility services—electric, gas, and plumbing lines—involved slow, tedious pick-and-shovel labor. Malzahn's idea was to create a compact trencher that would dramatically reduce the time and effort of this process. Working together, Ed and his father spent months in the family machine shop creating the prototype of what would be known as the DWP, which stood for Ditch Witch Power. As described by the ASME, "The DWP used a vertical bucket line with an endless bucket chain to carry off the spoil, ...Small two piece buckets with sharp, finger-like edges were mounted on the vertical chain to gouge out chunks of dirt. The buckets were attached in sequence onto an endless moving chain that carried them down a ladder type mechanism to chew out chunks of soil, then upward to dump the spoil in neat piles on the ground as they began the downward descent to bring up more dirt. A 6-inch wide trench with a digging depth of 30 inches was the goal.

The first production trencher rolled off the assembly line in 1949. Called the "endless conveyor ditch digging machine," It was the first mechanized, compact service-line trencher developed for laying underground water lines between the street main and the house. It was initially marketed for $750 per machine. Before the end of the 1950s, the company bought 160 acres (650,000 m^{2}) of land west of Perry and built a new manufacturing facility. In 1955, Ed Malzahn's endless conveyor ditch digging machine received U.S. Patent No. 2,714,262.

Alex Baker, a landscape contractor from Long Island, New York, bought the first DWP machine that came off the production line. He used it to install underground sprinkler systems until he traded it in for a newer model in 1959. Ditch Witch company restored the older model to mint condition and put it on display in the Ditch Witch museum in Perry.

In 1958, Charles Machine Works incorporated with Charlie and Ed Malzahn having equal control. During the same year, the first Ditch Witch international office opened in Australia. Meanwhile, the DWP led to the creation of the compact trencher industry, which today produces all types of equipment for efficiently installing any type of underground utilities including water, sewer and gas lines, as well as telecommunications, CATV, and fiber-optic cables. By 1969, customers included utility, telephone, and cable television companies, government agencies, and general contractors.

In 2019, the Toro Company acquired Charles Machine Works, maintaining it as a Toro subsidiary. (Note: Toro immediately announced that the CMW/Ditch Witch operations will remain in Perry. CMW reportedly generated $725 million in 2018.Toro, based in Bloomington, Minnesota, reported its world-wide sales were about $2.6 billion in 2018.)

Still based in Perry, Oklahoma, as of 2022, The Charles Machine Works designs and manufactures a wide variety of underground construction equipment: trenchers, vibratory plows, horizontal directional drilling systems, drill pipe, downhole tools, vacuum excavation systems, fluid management systems, and mini skid steers, all bearing the Ditch Witch name. Charles Machine Works’ campus outside of Perry contains a 30-acre (120,000 m^{2}) manufacturing plant as well as training, testing, research, and product development facilities. It employs more than 1,300 people, making the company the largest employer in Perry and in Noble County.

== Accolades and awards ==
- The Ditch Witch compact trencher has twice been named "one of the 100 best American-made products in the world" by Fortune magazine.
- On December 16, 2002, American Society of Mechanical Engineers President Susan H. Kemp awarded the Ditch Witch organization a bronze plaque designating the DWP as a historical mechanical engineering landmark.
