= Noble County Courthouse (Oklahoma) =

- U.S. National Register of Historic Places
- U.S. National Historic Landmark District – Contributing property
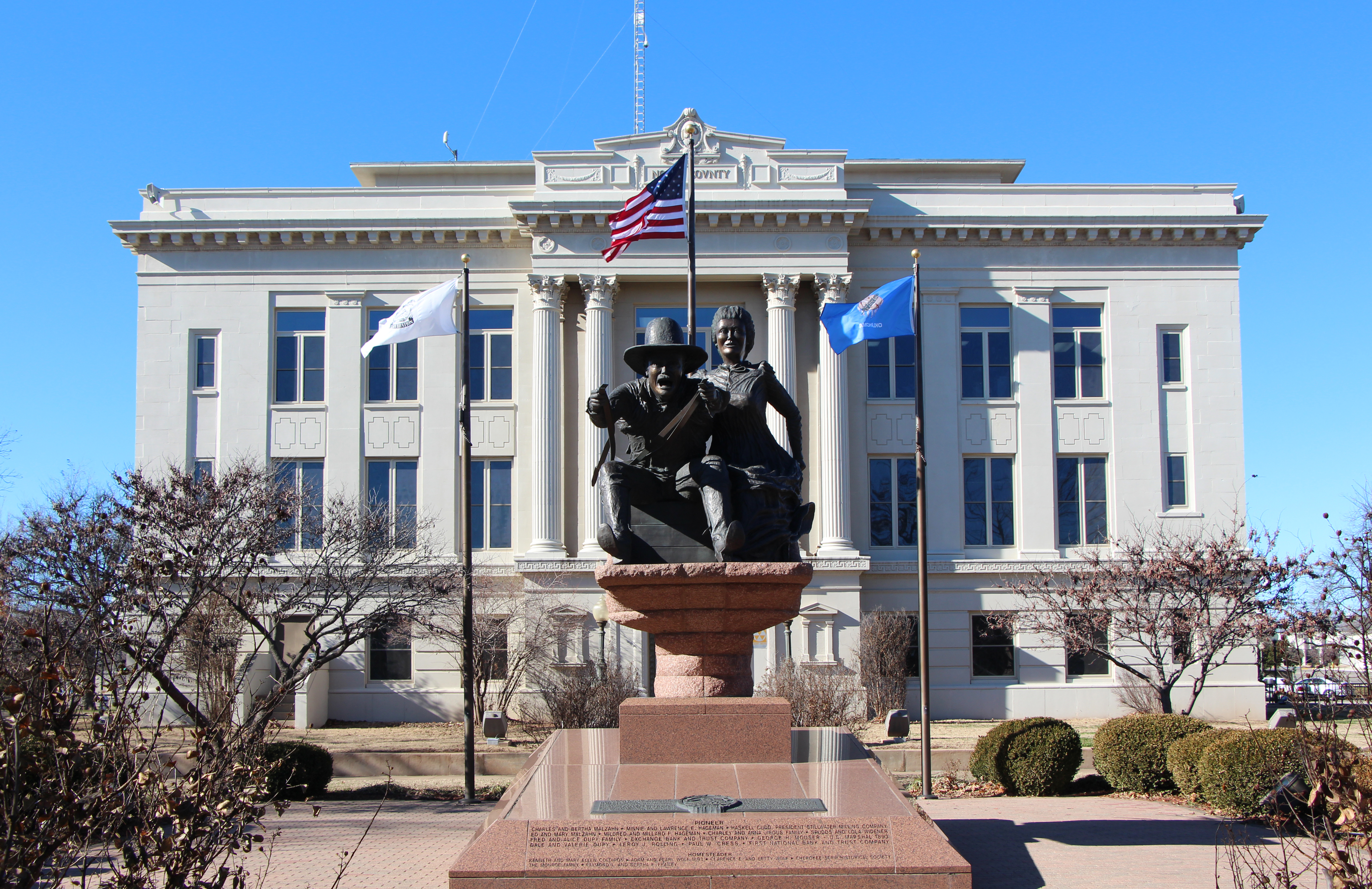
- Noble County Courthouse, 2015

- Location within Oklahoma Location within the United States
- Interactive map showing the location of Noble County Courthouse
- Location: Courthouse Sq., Perry, Oklahoma
- Coordinates: 36°17′12″N 97°17′11″W
- Area: 1 acre (0.40 ha)
- Built: 1915
- Architectural style: Late 19th And 20th Century Revivals
- Part of: Perry Courthouse Square Historic District (ID03000881)
- MPS: County Courthouses of Oklahoma TR
- NRHP reference No.: 84003361
- Added to NRHP: August 23, 1984

The Noble County Courthouse is a three-story building, built in 1915, located at the center of the Perry Courthouse Square Historic District. The size of the plot on which it stands is 1 acre (4,000 m^{2}). The architect was J.W. Hawk. There have been minimal alterations either inside or outside the building, and it still serves its original purpose as the center of county government and repository of all county records.

== Description ==
The Noble County Courthouse is constructed of stone and brick, and has a square footprint. The exterior is painted white. According to the NRHP nomination, the building's architecture style has many simplified features of the Second Renaissance Revival. The facades of all four elevations are divided between the first and second floors by a string course with Greek fretwork The facade of the first floor has heavily horizontally-incised, stone facing. Each of the four entries has fluted Corinthian pilaster strips and broken pediments. All of the windows are divided by flat-topped pilasters.

Alterations have been minimal, and the building retains its original architectural integrity.

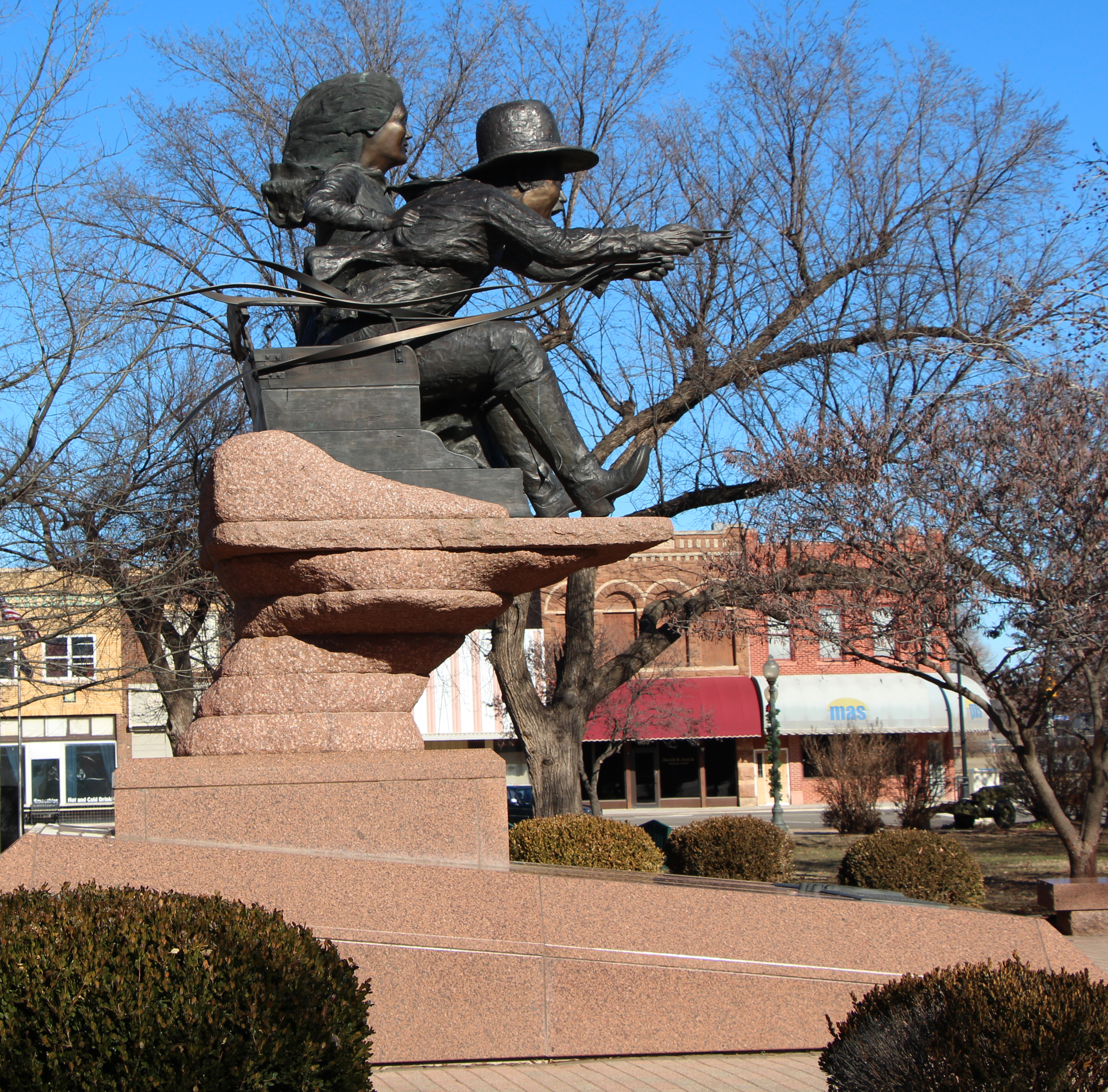
"Pioneer Statue" in front of Noble County Courthouse, 2015.

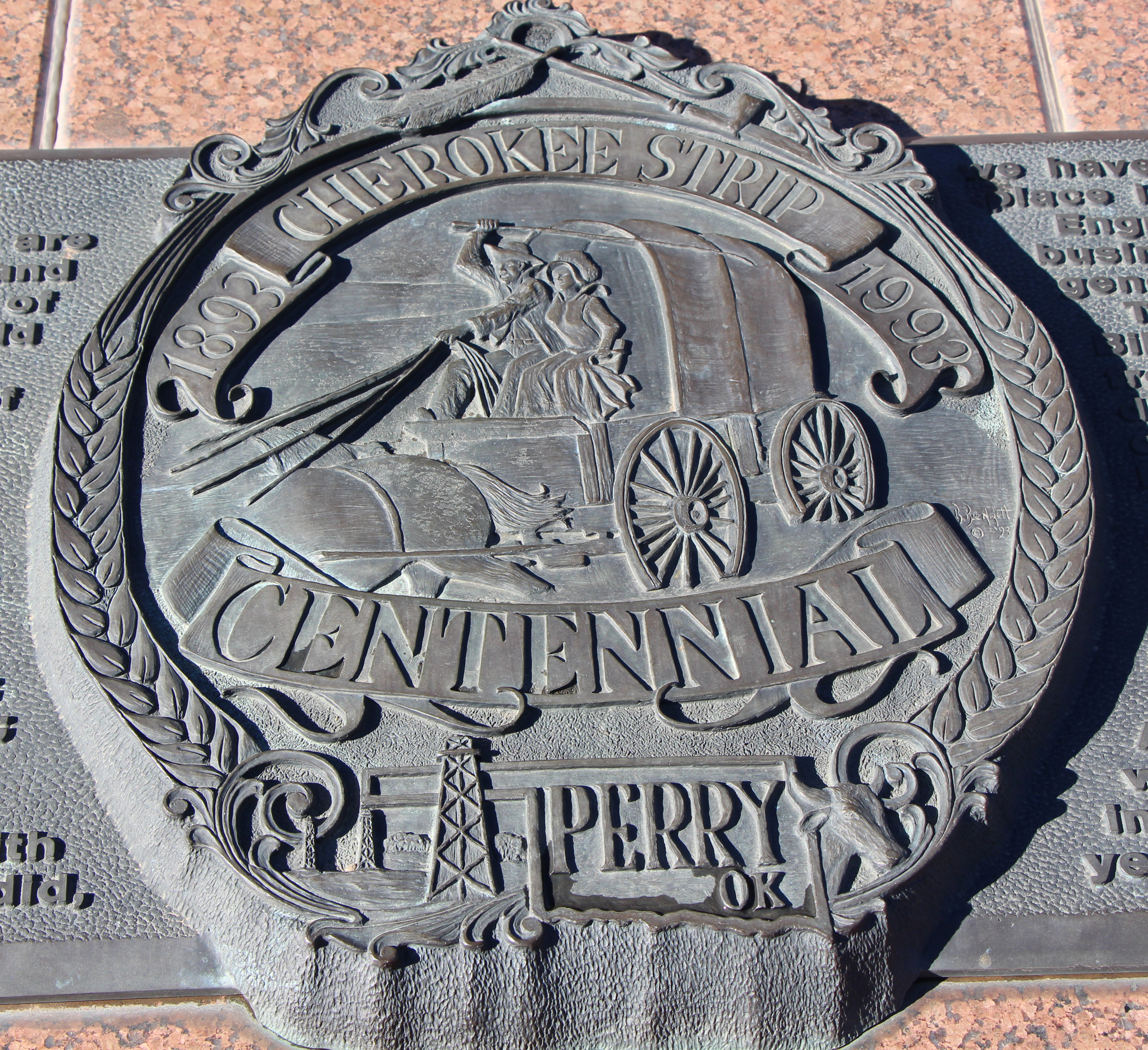
Plaque on Noble County Courthouse Statue, 2015.

== Statue ==
The statue on the courthouse lown, in front of the main entrance, is known either as the "Pioneer Statue" or the "Hopes and Dreams" statue. It depicts a man and woman riding in the land run on a buggy. The base of the slab on the ground shows the names of a number of Noble County pioneers and homesteaders on the front. The names of frontiersmen, claimstakers, and boomers are listed on the back of the slab. The red granite slab and the base of the statue were provided by Willia Granite Co. The sculptor is unidentified.
