= Perry, Oklahoma =

- City
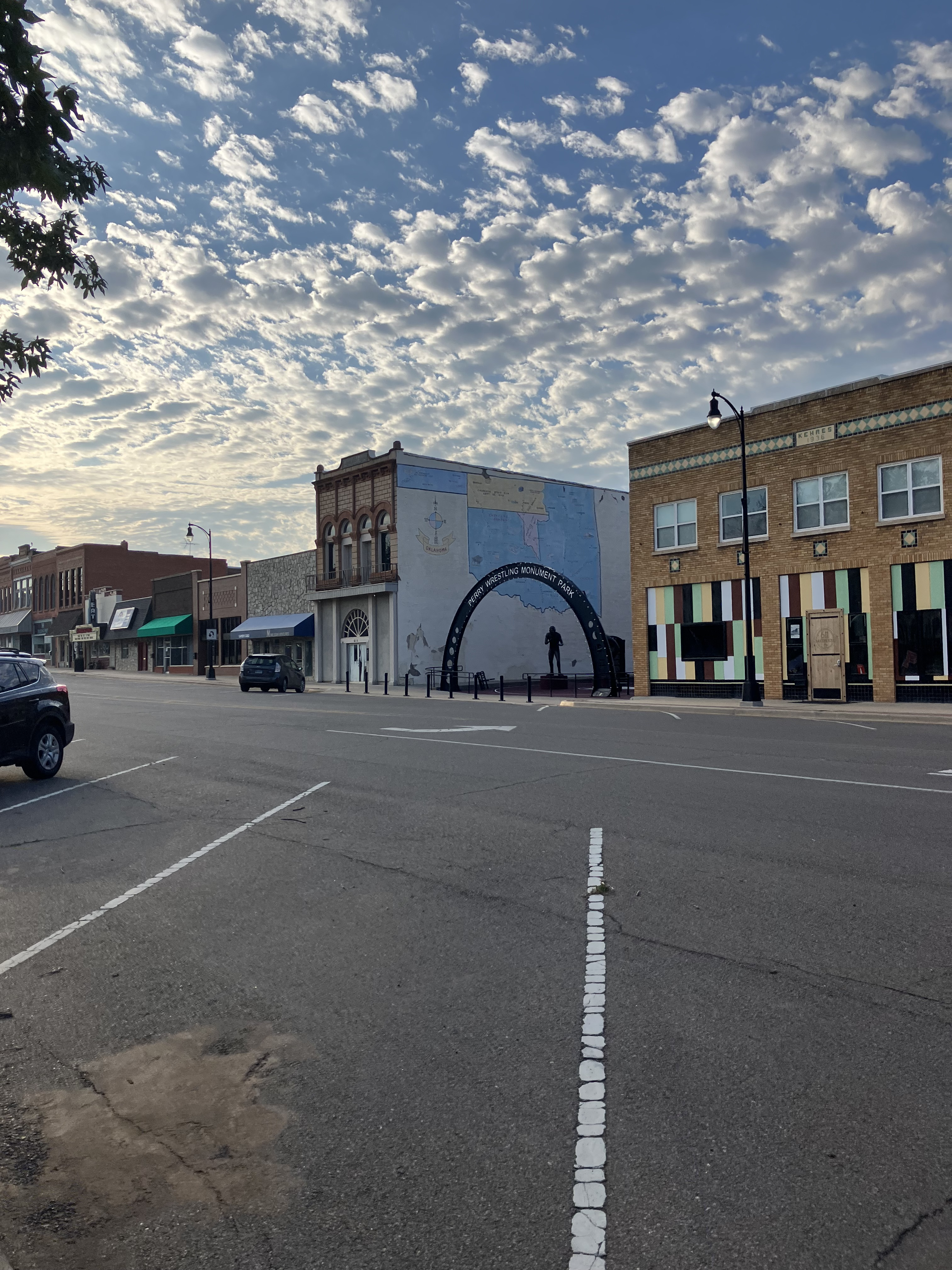
- Downtown Perry (2024)

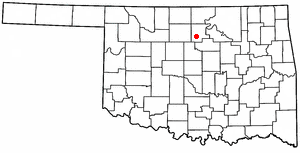
- Location within Noble County and Oklahoma
- Coordinates: 36°17′01″N 97°18′34″W
- Country: United States
- State: Oklahoma
- County: Noble

Area
  - Total: 7.78 sq mi (20.14 km^{2})
  - Land: 6.82 sq mi (17.66 km^{2})
  - Water: 0.96 sq mi (2.48 km^{2})
- Elevation: 1,060 ft (320 m)

Population (2020)
  - Total: 4,484
  - Density: 657.7/sq mi (253.95/km^{2})
- Time zone: UTC−6 (CST)
  - Summer (DST): UTC−5 (CDT)
- ZIP code: 73077
- Area code: 580
- FIPS code: 40-58250
- GNIS feature ID: 2411404
- Website: cityofperryok.com

Perry is a city in and the county seat of Noble County, Oklahoma, United States. As of the 2020 census, Perry had a population of 4,484. The city is home of Ditch Witch construction equipment manufacture.

== History ==
=== 19th century ===
The Treaty of New Echota, May 23, 1836, assigned the Cherokee Outlet to the Cherokees as a perpetual outlet to use for passage to travel and hunt in the West from their reservation in the eastern part of what became Oklahoma. This was in addition to the land given to the Cherokees for settlement after their arrival from their home in Georgia.

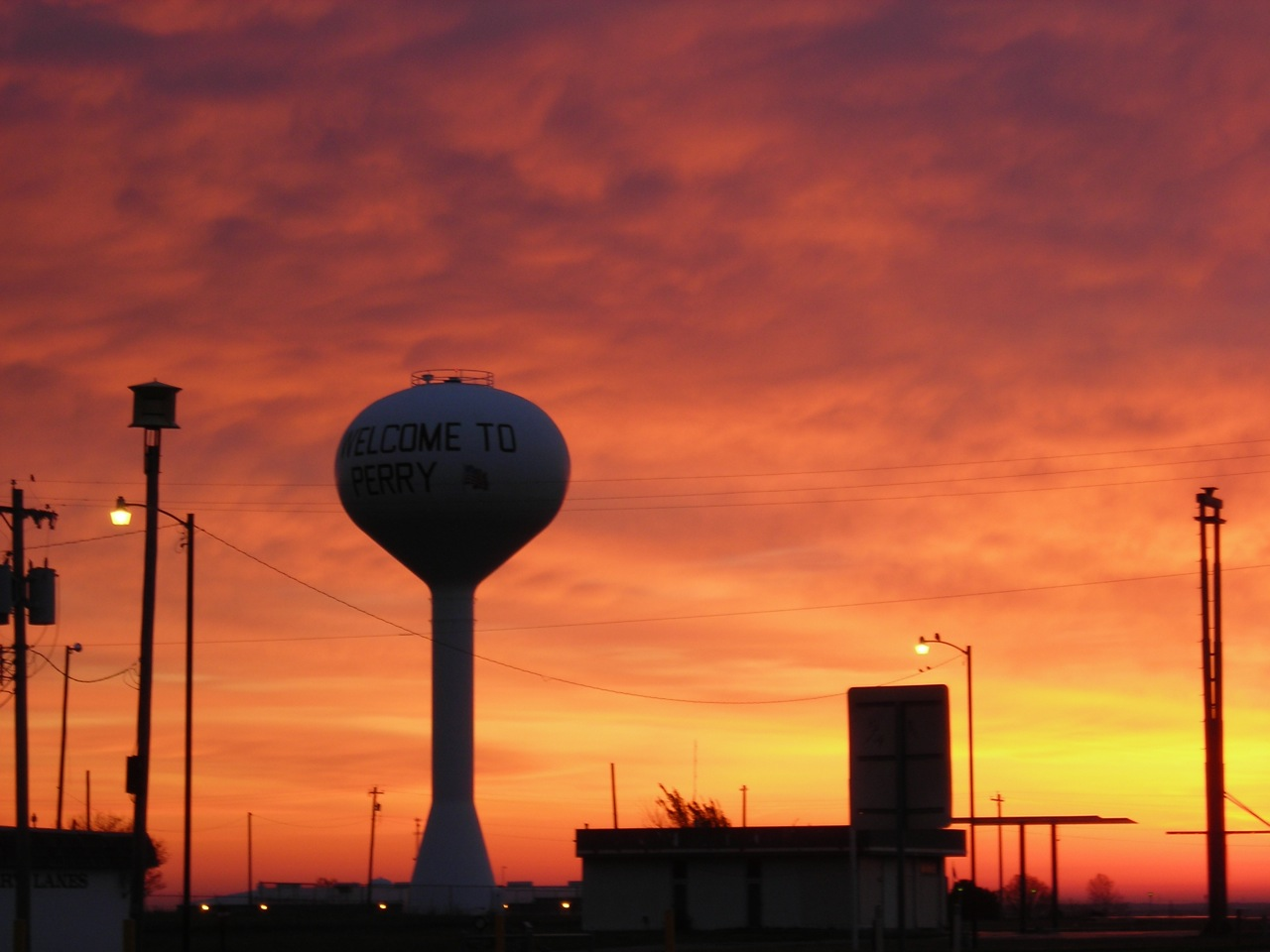
Sunrise in Perry (2007)

Perry's original name was Wharton, the name of a train station built in 1886 by the Southern Kansas Railway (part of the Atchison, Topeka and Santa Fe Railway system) about 1 mile south of the present city, and it was located within the Outlet. Before the 1893 Cherokee Outlet Opening, the U.S. government selected a site a mile north of Wharton for a land office. A town around the office was named after J.A. Perry, a man sent by the government to lay out land office towns. Perry later became one of the township location commissioners. Noble County, then known as "County P", was named after John Willock Noble of St. Louis, the Interior Secretary for President William Henry Harrison.

The Dalton Gang, which at that time included Bob Dalton, Emmett Dalton, Charlie Bryant, and George Newcomb, entered Wharton to rob a train in May 1891, stealing $1745. Shortly after the robbery, Bryant fell ill and was taken to Hennessey to see a doctor, but was spotted and arrested by Deputy Marshal Ed Short. During an escape attempt, Bryant and Short killed each other. Among those within the boundary of the Strip prior to the opening were the notorious Bill Doolin gang. A Santa Fe train was robbed at Wharton before the opening, and the gang escaped into Osage County. U.S. Marshal E.D. Nix and 100 deputies were commissioned to police the area and keep order.

At noon on September 16, 1893, "a run" for land within "the Strip" was opened. An estimated 90,000 men, women, and children took part and by nightfall, 40,000 had erected tents in Perry. Jack Tearney started at the county line and reached Perry within 31 minutes. By 4:00 pm, he had erected and opened the "Blue Bell" saloon, selling beer the first day for $1.00 a bottle, due to the scarcity of water, he sold 38,000 glasses.

Named "Hell's Half Acre", the original town's perimeter included A and F Streets and 1st and 9th Streets. About 110 saloons and gambling houses were in operation, with many of them set up 1/2 block east of the west side of the now-existing square.

Perry incorporated on September 20, 1893.

=== 20th century ===
In 1902, Carl Malzahn, a German immigrant, moved to Perry and opened the Malzahn Blacksmith Shop with his sons, Charles (Charlie) and Gus. The sons took over the business in 1913 and renamed it Malzahn Brothers' General Blacksmithing, specializing in repairing equipment for the nearby oil fields. After Gus died in 1928, the surviving brother renamed the business, Charlie’s Machine Shop. Charlie's son, Ed, a mechanical engineer, joined the business in 1944. Ed noticed a need for a machine to replace hand digging trenches for the installation of residential utility lines, and set to work developing such a device. By 1948, he had a successful device, a compact trencher, which he called the Ditch Witch. Soon, Ditch Witch became a successful company, wholly owned by the now-renamed Charles Machine Works Company, since 2019 a subsidiary of The Toro Company. It has grown into the largest employer in Perry and in Noble County, employing approximately 1,300 people.

Timothy McVeigh was stopped on April 19, 1995, along Interstate 35 outside of Perry by Oklahoma Highway Patrol Trooper Charlie Hanger. Trooper Hanger had passed McVeigh's yellow 1977 Mercury Marquis and noticed it had no license plate. He arrested McVeigh for carrying a loaded firearm. Three days later, while still in jail, McVeigh was identified as the subject of a nationwide manhunt for the perpetrator of the Oklahoma City bombing, which had happened on the day of McVeigh's arrest.

=== 21st century ===
Perry moved from a strong mayor form of government to a home rule charter. The town is in the process of transitioning to a city manager.

Operating under the home rule charter form of government, the City of Perry divides its responsibilities between the city council and the city manager. The city council acts as the legislative branch, establishing ordinances, setting policy, authorizing budgets, and directing the city manager when appropriate. The city manager oversees day-to-day operations and administration of the city. Together with city staff, the city manager and city council work to make the most efficient use of the limited resources available to the city.

As of February 2001, it is the smallest town in Oklahoma with a daily newspaper.

== Geography ==
Perry is 60 miles (97 km) north of Oklahoma City, and 100 miles (160 km) south of Wichita, Kansas.

According to the United States Census Bureau, the city has a total area of 6.8 square miles (18 km^{2}), of which 0.8 sq mi (2.1 km^{2}) (10.98%) is covered by water.

=== Climate ===
Climate data for Perry, Oklahoma (1991–2020)
Month	Jan	Feb	Mar	Apr	May	Jun	Jul	Aug	Sep	Oct	Nov	Dec	Year
Mean daily maximum °F (°C)	48.8 (9.3)	53.5 (11.9)	62.5 (16.9)	72.0 (22.2)	80.2 (26.8)	89.8 (32.1)	94.8 (34.9)	93.7 (34.3)	85.6 (29.8)	74.6 (23.7)	61.2 (16.2)	50.2 (10.1)	72.2 (22.3)
Daily mean °F (°C)	36.9 (2.7)	40.8 (4.9)	49.8 (9.9)	59.3 (15.2)	69.1 (20.6)	78.7 (25.9)	83.4 (28.6)	82.1 (27.8)	73.9 (23.3)	61.8 (16.6)	49.3 (9.6)	39.1 (3.9)	60.4 (15.8)
Mean daily minimum °F (°C)	24.9 (−3.9)	28.1 (−2.2)	37.2 (2.9)	46.6 (8.1)	58.1 (14.5)	67.6 (19.8)	72.0 (22.2)	70.5 (21.4)	62.2 (16.8)	48.9 (9.4)	37.4 (3.0)	28.0 (−2.2)	48.5 (9.2)
Average precipitation inches (mm)	1.25 (32)	1.50 (38)	2.58 (66)	3.98 (101)	5.19 (132)	4.44 (113)	3.54 (90)	3.44 (87)	3.13 (80)	3.25 (83)	1.94 (49)	1.84 (47)	36.08 (918)
Average snowfall inches (cm)	1.5 (3.8)	1.3 (3.3)	1.8 (4.6)	0.0 (0.0)	0.0 (0.0)	0.0 (0.0)	0.0 (0.0)	0.0 (0.0)	0.0 (0.0)	0.0 (0.0)	0.0 (0.0)	1.9 (4.8)	6.5 (16.5)
Source: NOAA

== Demographics ==
Historical population
Census	Pop.	Note	%±
1900	3,351		—
1910	3,133		−6.5%
1920	3,154		0.7%
1930	4,206		33.4%
1940	5,045		19.9%
1950	5,137		1.8%
1960	5,210		1.4%
1970	5,341		2.5%
1980	5,796		8.5%
1990	4,978		−14.1%
2000	5,230		5.1%
2010	5,126		−2.0%
2020	4,484		−12.5%
U.S. Decennial Census

=== 2020 census ===
As of the 2020 census, Perry had a population of 4,484. The median age was 41.4 years; 23.8% of the residents were under of 18 and 20.6% were 65 or older. For every 100 females, there were 92.0 males, and for every 100 females 18 and over, there were 90.4 males 18 and over.

Almost all of the residents lived in urban areas, while 1.8% lived in rural areas.

Of the 1,918 households in Perry, 30.4% had children under 18 living in them, 42.3% were married-couple households, 21.5% were households with a male householder and no spouse or partner present, and 30.1% were households with a female householder and no spouse or partner present. About 34.1% of all households were made up of individuals, and 17.0% had someone living alone who was 65 or older.

The city had 2,279 housing units, of which 15.8% were vacant. Among occupied housing units, 67.5% were owner-occupied and 32.5% were renter-occupied. The homeowner vacancy rate was 4.0% and the rental vacancy rate was 11.1%.

Racial composition as of the 2020 census
Race	Percentage
White	80.5%
Black or African American	2.4%
American Indian and Alaska Native	4.2%
Asian	0.7%
Native Hawaiian and other Pacific Islander	0%
Some other race	1.3%
Two or more races	10.9%
Hispanics or Latinos (of any race)	4.8%

=== 2000 census ===
As of the 2000 census, 5,230 people, 2,203 households, and 1,445 families were residing in the city. The population density was 860.1 inhabitants per square mile (332.1/km^{2}). The 2,493 housing units had an average density of 410.0 per square mile (158.3/km^{2}). The racial makeup of the city was 89.7% White, 3.1% African American, 3.3% Native American, 0.5% Asian, 0.1% Pacific Islander, 0.6% from other races, and 2.7% from two or more races. Hispanics or Latinos of any race were 1.8% of the population.

Of the 2,203 households, 29.4% had children under 18 living with them, 52.6% were married couples living together, 9.0% had a female householder with no husband present, and 34.4% were not families. About 30.6% of all households were made up of individuals, and 14.6% had someone living alone who was 65 or older. The average household size was 2.31, and the average family size was 2.88.

In the city, the age distribution was 24.0% under 18, 8.9% from 18 to 24, 27.2% from 25 to 44, 21.6% from 45 to 64, and 18.4% who were 65 or older. The median age was 38 years. The overall female/male ratio was 1:0.924 and for over 18 was 1:0.905.

The median income in the city for a household was $30,653 and for a family was $37,731. Males had a median income of $30,485 versus $22,039 for females. The per capita income for the city was $16,924. About 10.4% of families and 14.0% of the population were below the poverty line, including 16.2% of those under 18 and 11.0% of those 65 or over.

== Economy ==
The city is home to Charles Machine Works, which is the headquarters and manufacturing facility of Ditch Witch machinery and employs over 1,300 people. In November 2022, the company announced an expansion, adding over 200,000 square feet to the Ditch Witch campus with 100 new jobs.

== Government ==
The City of Perry has been governed under a home rule city charter form of government since the motion passed by popular vote and was approved by the governor in 2008.

The Perry Police Department consists of 12 full-time police officers, five dispatchers, and an animal control officer. The chief of police is Brian Thomas.

The Perry Fire Department has nine full-time firefighters.

== Education ==
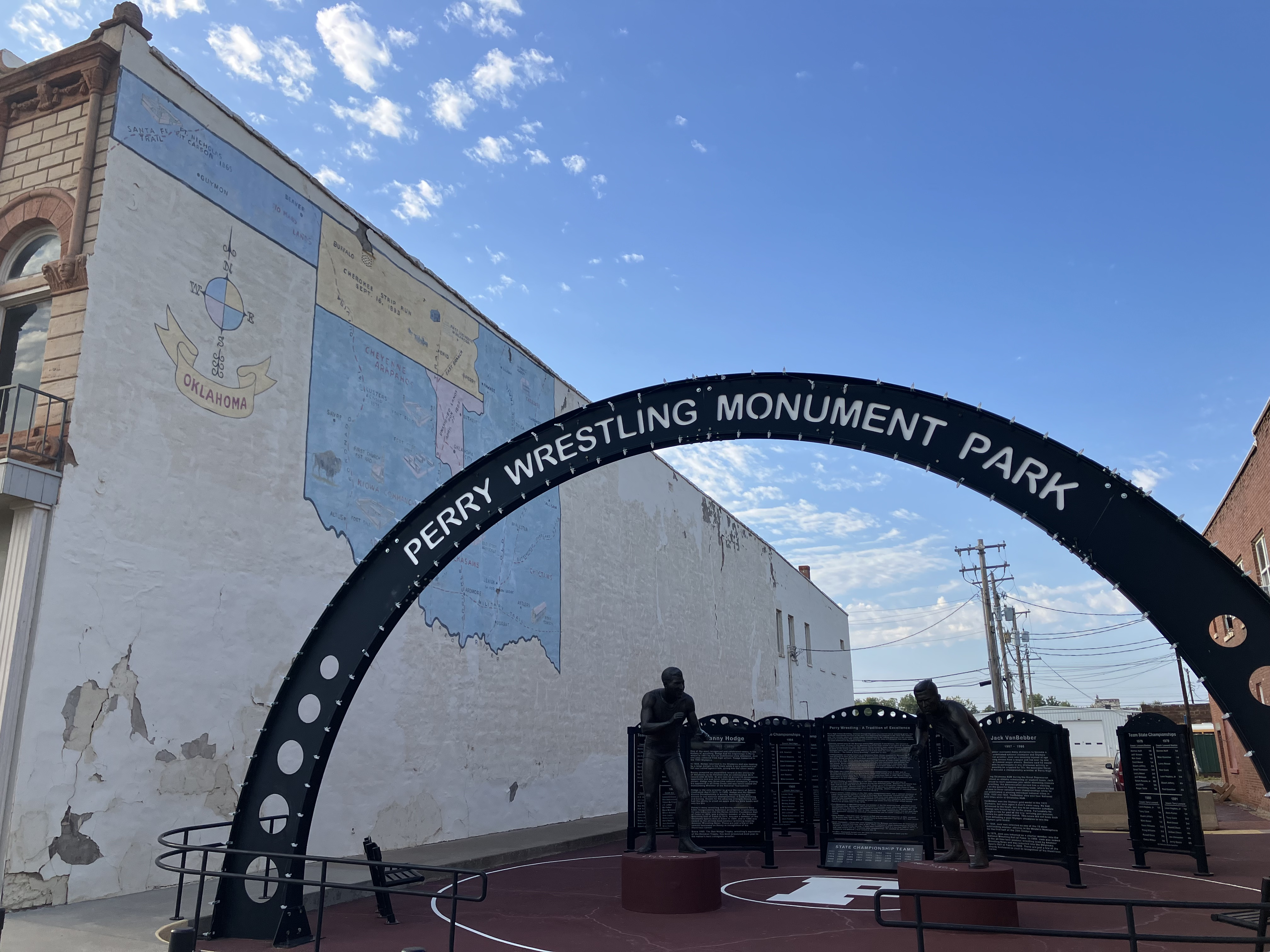
Wrestling Monument Park in Perry (2024)

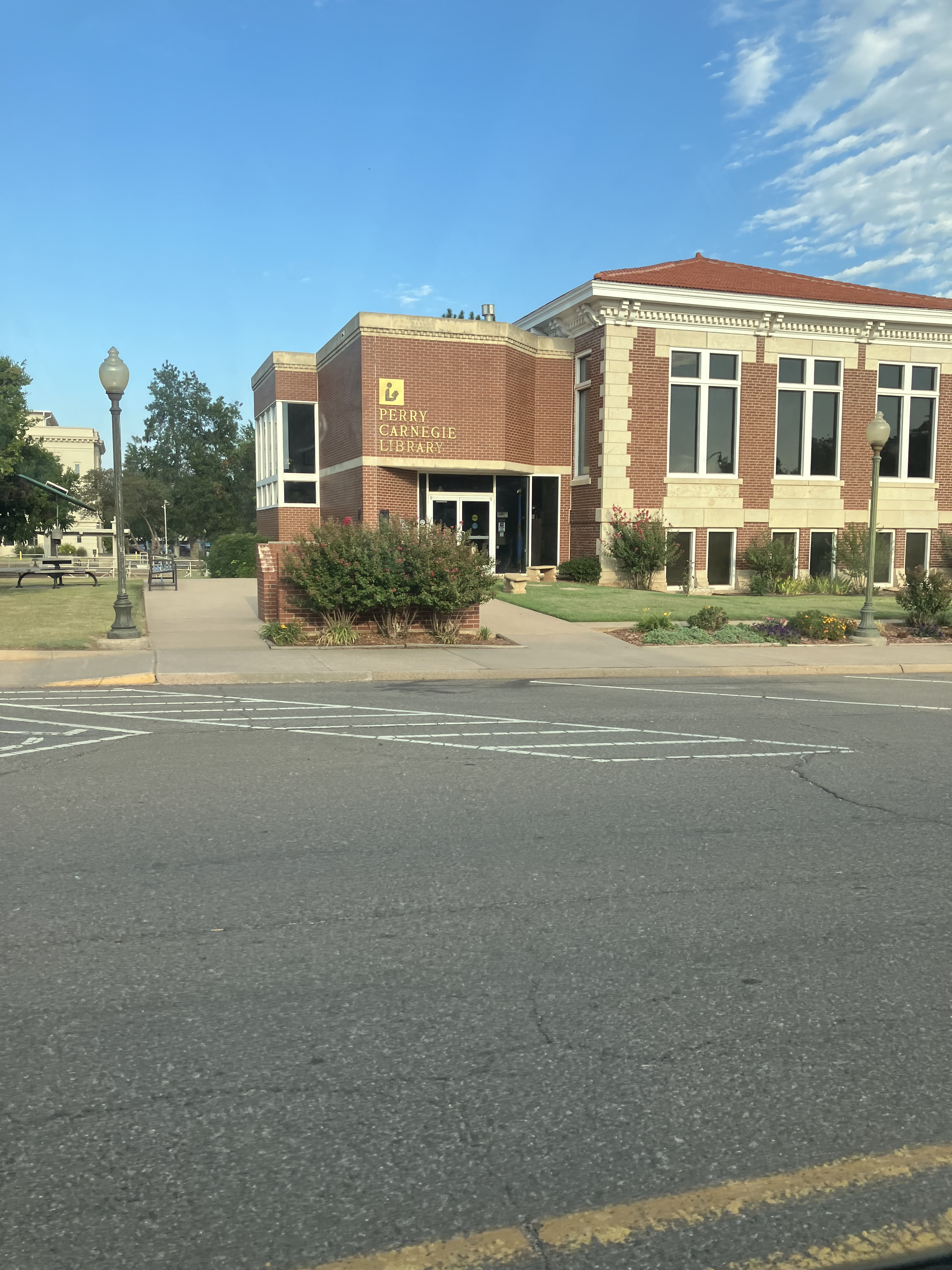
Carnegie Library in Perry (2024)

Perry Public Schools include:

- Perry High School, grades 9–12
- Perry Junior-High School, grades 7–8
- Perry Upper Elementary School, grades 3–6
- Perry Lower Elementary School, prekindergarten–grade 2

Perry High School is noted for its wrestling program, historically one of the most successful programs in the United States; it has won 63 state championships, including 43 team and 20 dual championships since 1952, and 163 individual state championships.

Perry is also home to one of the many Carnegie Libraries in the United States.

== Historic sites ==
Multiple historic sites in Perry are NRHP-listed:

- First National Bank and Trust Company Building
- Noble County Courthouse
- Perry Armory
- Perry Courthouse Square Historic District
- Perry Lake Park]
- Wolleson–Nicewander Building

== Parks and recreation ==
The Cherokee Strip Museum, operated by the Oklahoma Historical Society, provides an opportunity to explore the remarkable events and people in the history of the Cherokee Outlet. The facility includes the Rose Hill School, giving fourth-grade students an opportunity to experience an education from yesteryear, and a blacksmith shop, allowing visitors to see what crafting tools was like in pioneer days.

Since 2016, Perry has operated the Perry BMAC Baseball Complex, complete with four ball fields, each equipped with a digital scoreboard and control system. The complex includes covered bleachers and a full concessions area.

Perry Lake is 2 miles off US-77. The lake was originally created to be the primary water source for the City of Perry, but its primary use is now recreational. The lake offers boating, skiing, swimming, fishing, and recreational vehicle camping.

CCC Lake and Park, created in 1934 by the Civilian Conservation Corps (CCC) as part of the New Deal, is just to the south of Perry on SH-86. The lake itself is now Perry’s primary water source; while swimming and fishing are allowed, only trolling motors are permitted on the lake. Three pavilions are available for use, as is Centennial Church, a beautiful 1894 building moved to the park and fully renovated by 2007. All these facilities can be reserved for special occasions.

Lake McMurtry is to the southeast, and Lake Carl Blackwell is to the south.

== Notable people ==
- Thomas H. Doyle, American attorney, politician, judge who moved to Perry before statehood and served as member of Territorial Congress (1897–1901) and U.S. Congress (1901–1907); later served on Oklahoma Court of Criminal Appeals (1915–1947).
- Ralph Foster, American football player
- Robert Galbreath, Jr. (1863–1953), started Perry Evening Democrat and later discovered the Glenn Pool Oil Reserve
- Jake Hager, MMA fighter, professional wrestler
- Danny Hodge, professional wrestler, Olympic wrestler, boxer
- Henry S. Johnston, Oklahoma governor
- Little Britches, female bandit lived briefly in Perry in 1895
- Sharron Miller, Emmy Award and Directors Guild of America Award winning television director, producer, writer
- Billy Pricer, American football player
- Jack van Bebber, Olympic gold medalist in freestyle wrestling
- La Vern E. Weber, United States Army Lieutenant General and Chief of the National Guard Bureau

== See also ==
- Noble County Courthouse (Perry, Oklahoma)
- Perry Courthouse Square Historic District
