= Perry Courthouse Square Historic District =

Historic district in Oklahoma, United States

- U.S. National Register of Historic Places
- U.S. Historic district
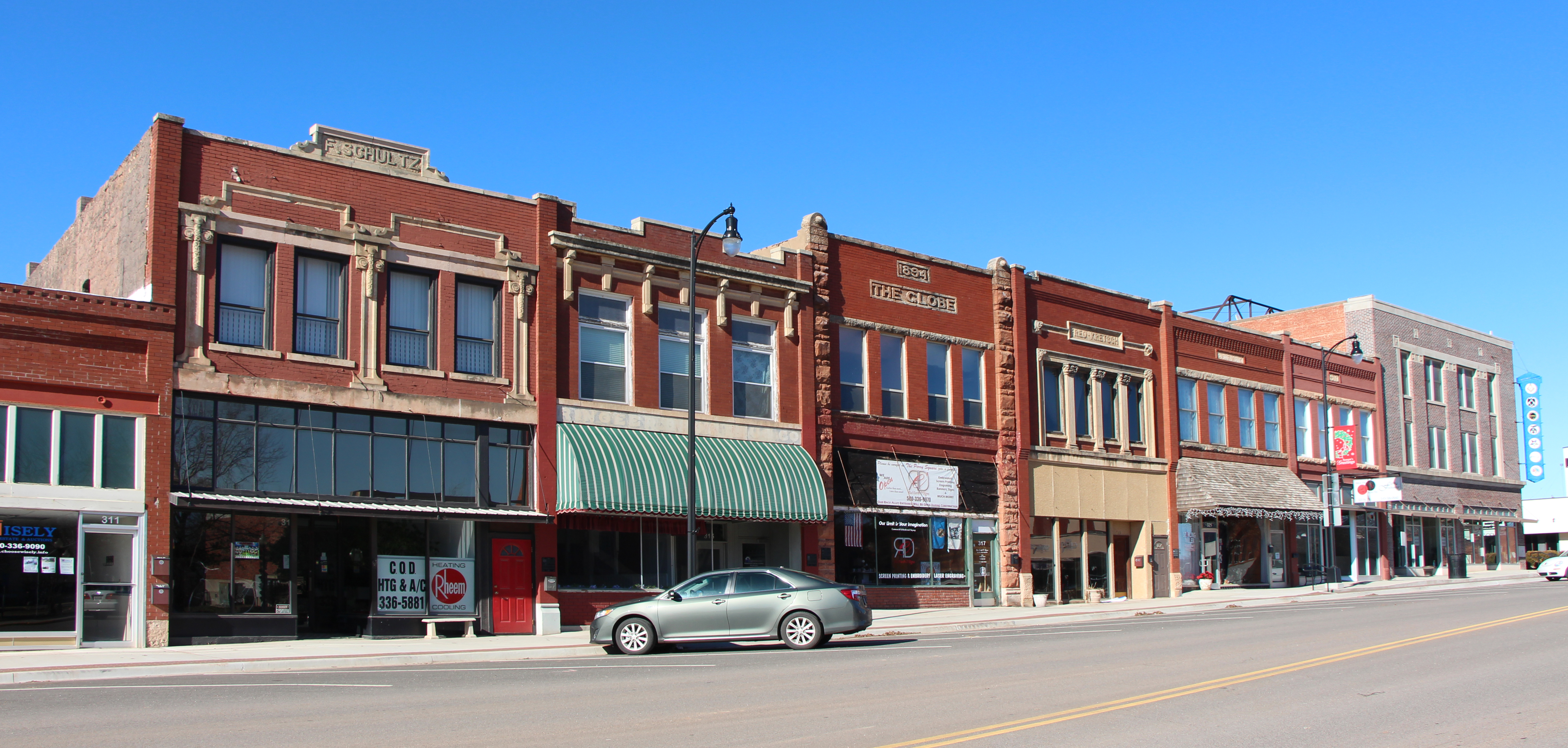
- Commercial buildings in the district

- Location within Oklahoma Location within the United States
- Interactive map showing the location of Perry County Courthouse Square Historic District
- Location: Roughly bounded by Birch, Elm, Sixth and Seventh, Perry, Oklahoma
- Area: 33.5 acres (13.6 ha)
- Built: 1910
- Architect: J.W. Hawk, et.al.
- Architectural style: Late Victorian, Late 19th And Early 20th Century American Movements
- NRHP reference No.: 03000881
- Added to NRHP: September 2, 2003

The Perry Courthouse Square Historic District in Perry, Oklahoma, derives its name from the presence of the Noble County Courthouse, built in 1915. It contains the majority of the commercial development of the original Perry townsite. The district contains 132 buildings, (including the First National Bank and Trust Company Building, the Noble County Courthouse, and the Wolleson-Nicewander Building, previously listed on the National Register of Historic Places), 92 contributing resources, and 37 noncontributing resources. Its period of significance is given as 1893 to 1953. The period begins with the Land Run of 1893. (Note: This run was also known as the Cherokee Outlet Opening.)The District was added to the National Register of Historic Places under Criteria A and C on September 2, 2003. The NRIS reference number is 03000881.

== Description ==
The PCSHD is in downtown Perry, Oklahoma. Most of the downtown is included in the District. It is bounded by Birch, Elm, Sixth and Seventh Streets. Birch, Flynn, Elm and Gene Taylor are streets within the district which still retain their original brick paving. All other streets in the district have been paved more recently with asphalt According to the NRHP application, the parts excluded from the District have been altered so much as to disrupt the look and feel of the original area.

== National Register of Historic Places (NRHP) list ==
The District still retains about 72 percent of its commercial architecture that was built during its Period of Significance. This strong retention qualifies the District under Criterion C. Many of the commercial buildings were built in the Plains Commercial and Territorial styles.

The NRHP application notes that the Central Square (the area containing the Courthouse, post office and land office) also supports Criterion C. This area was named "Government Acre," and was laid out by Hoke Smith, Secretary of the Interior under President Grover Cleveland.

== History ==
Perry became a beehive of activity after noon on September 16, 1893. The scene was almost chaotic as an estimated 25,000 people crowded into town on the first night. The original size of the townsite was 1 mile (1.6 km)long from east to west and 0.5 miles (0.80 km). It contained the land office for this run. Prospective settlers needed to register their claims at the land office (located in a wooden courthouse), as soon as possible. (Note: Perry had been designated as the seat of County P of the newly declared Oklahoma Territory shortly before the run.) People who intended to live and work in the town immediately threw up tents, some of which would remain in place for several years. Gradually, the tents were replaced by wooden buildings with false fronts. The Globe Building, built in 1894, was the first permanent building in Perry. The Globe housed a mercantile general store. It was of Late Victorian commercial style architecture. (Note: Late Victorian style is based on Italianate and Romanesque styles.)

=== Government Acre ===
The area on the eastern end of the townsite was designated as "Government Acre". (Note: Government Acre actually covered 5 acres (20,000 m^{2})) It would eventually contain the Noble County Courthouse, the Carnegie Library, the Post Office and the city's Central Park. The Land Office was relocated immediately east of Government Acre. Another area east of Government Acre was called "Hell's Half Acre," because it contained most of the saloons and dance halls.

After squatters were driven off, Government Acre was a dusty lot in the center of town, occupied only by the small wooden Post Office building. In 1895, the ground was planted with alfalfa to hold down the sand and dust.

Will T. Little, a local nature lover, got permission from the county commissioners in 1896, to plant elm tree seedlings on Government Acre. He planted 8,600 seedlings, each 6 to 8 inches long. They obviously thrived, because enough trees were sold from this crop to repay the cost of planting. The rest were left in place to adorn the courthouse lawn in memory of Mr. Little.

Although the county needed a central government office as soon as it was formed, there were no funds to build a courthouse. A lumber company, T. M. Richardson & Sons, Inc., constructed a two-story wooden building on the east side of the property to serve this purpose. The donated building served well for twenty years, when the county voters passed a $100,000 bond issue to construct the present Noble County Courthouse, which is now listed on the National Register of Historic Properties.

== See also ==
- First National Bank and Trust Company Building (Perry, Oklahoma)
- Noble County Courthouse (Perry, Oklahoma)
- Wolleson-Nicewander Building
