= Perry Armory =

- U.S. National Register of Historic Places
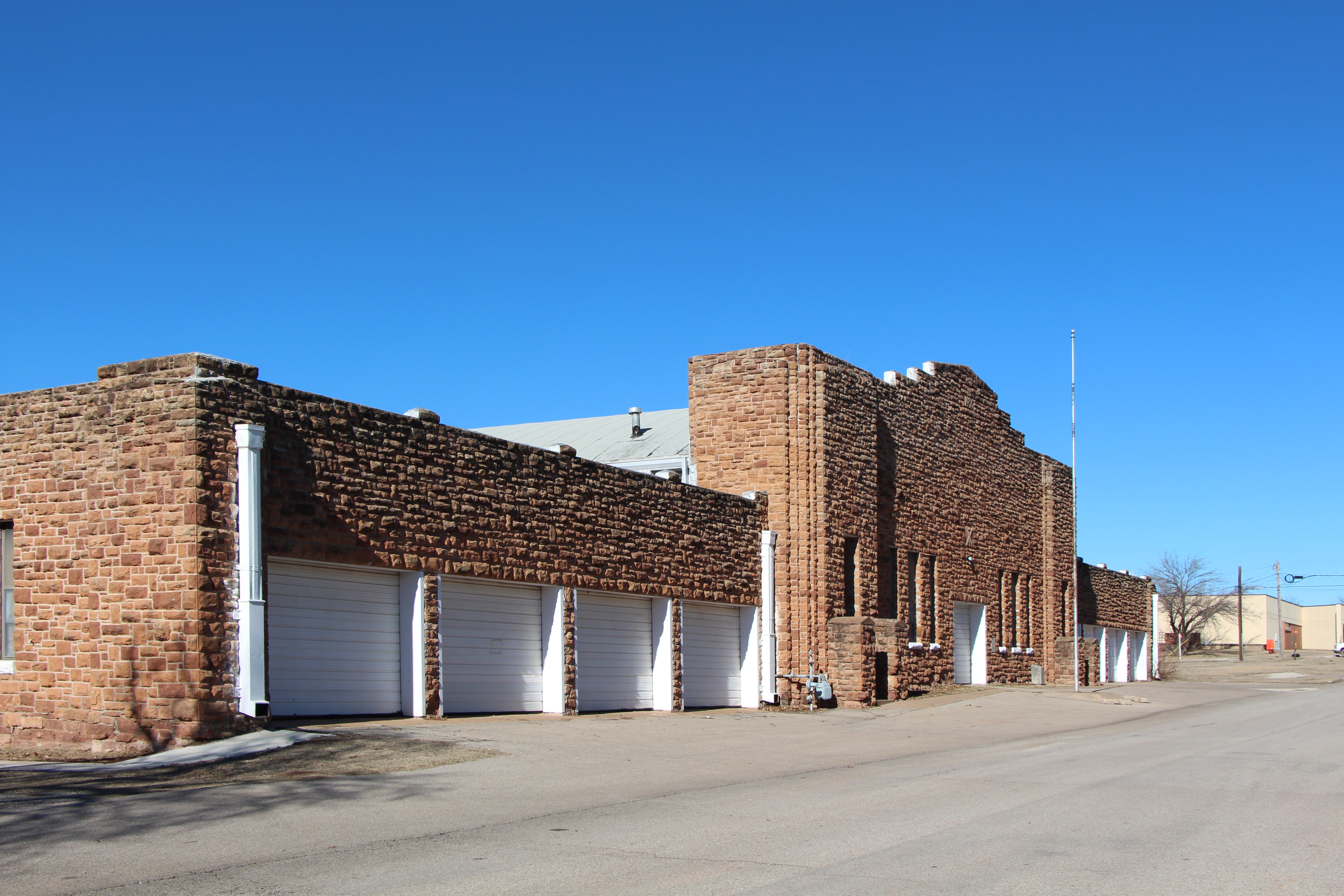

- Location within Oklahoma Location within the United States
- Location: Delaware and Fourteenth Sts., Perry, Oklahoma
- Coordinates: 36°17′13″N 97°17′57″W
- Area: less than one acre
- Built: 1936
- Architectural style: Romanesque, Vernacular Romanesque
- MPS: WPA Public Bldgs., Recreational Facilities and Water Quality Improvements in Northwestern Oklahoma, 1935--1943 TR
- NRHP reference No.: 88001362
- Added to NRHP: September 8, 1988

The Perry National Guard Armory is a 210 x 120 foot structure of native stone. It was constructed by the Work Projects Administration, and employed 90,000 man-hours of labor. It has been used for public gatherings as well as the headquarters of Battery C, 158th Field Artillery, Oklahoma National Guard.

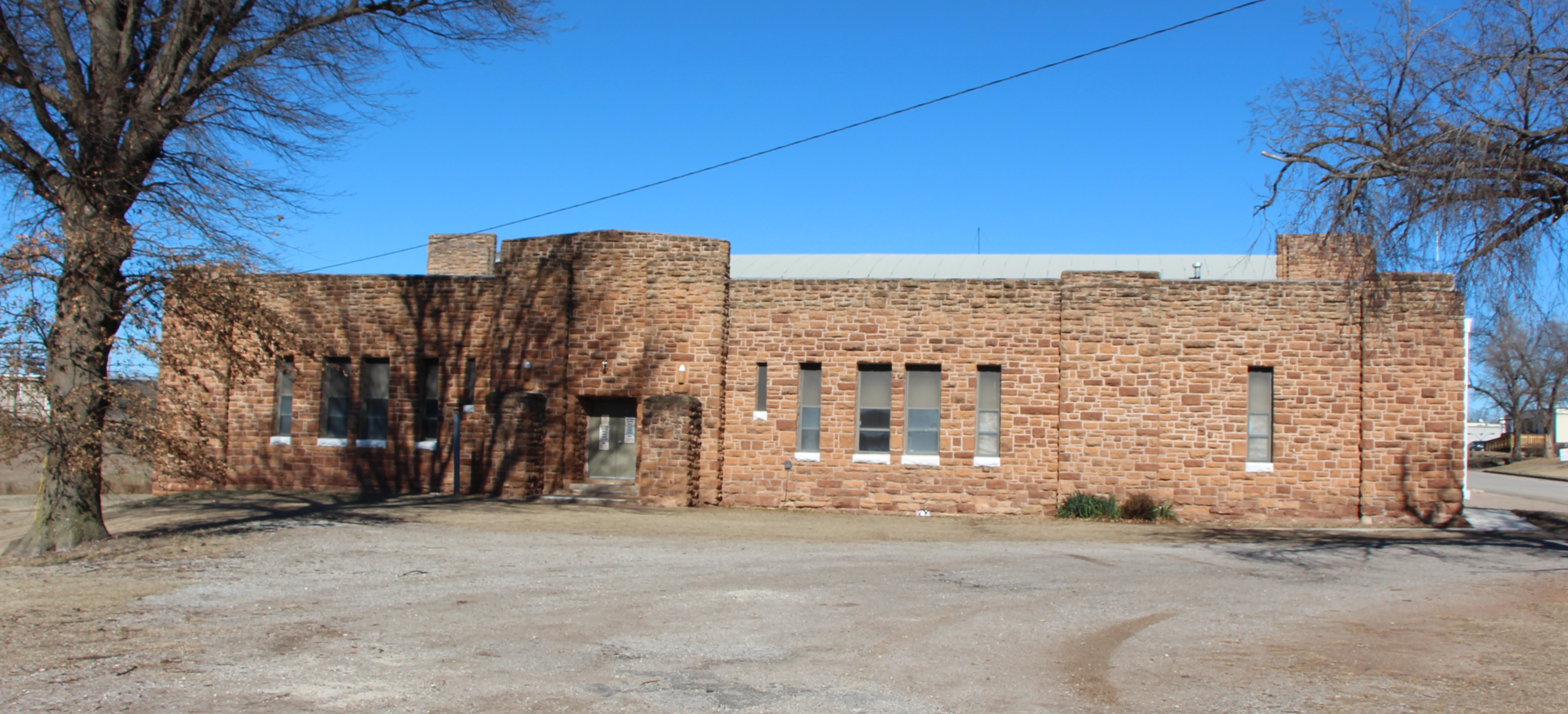
Perry Armory, south side

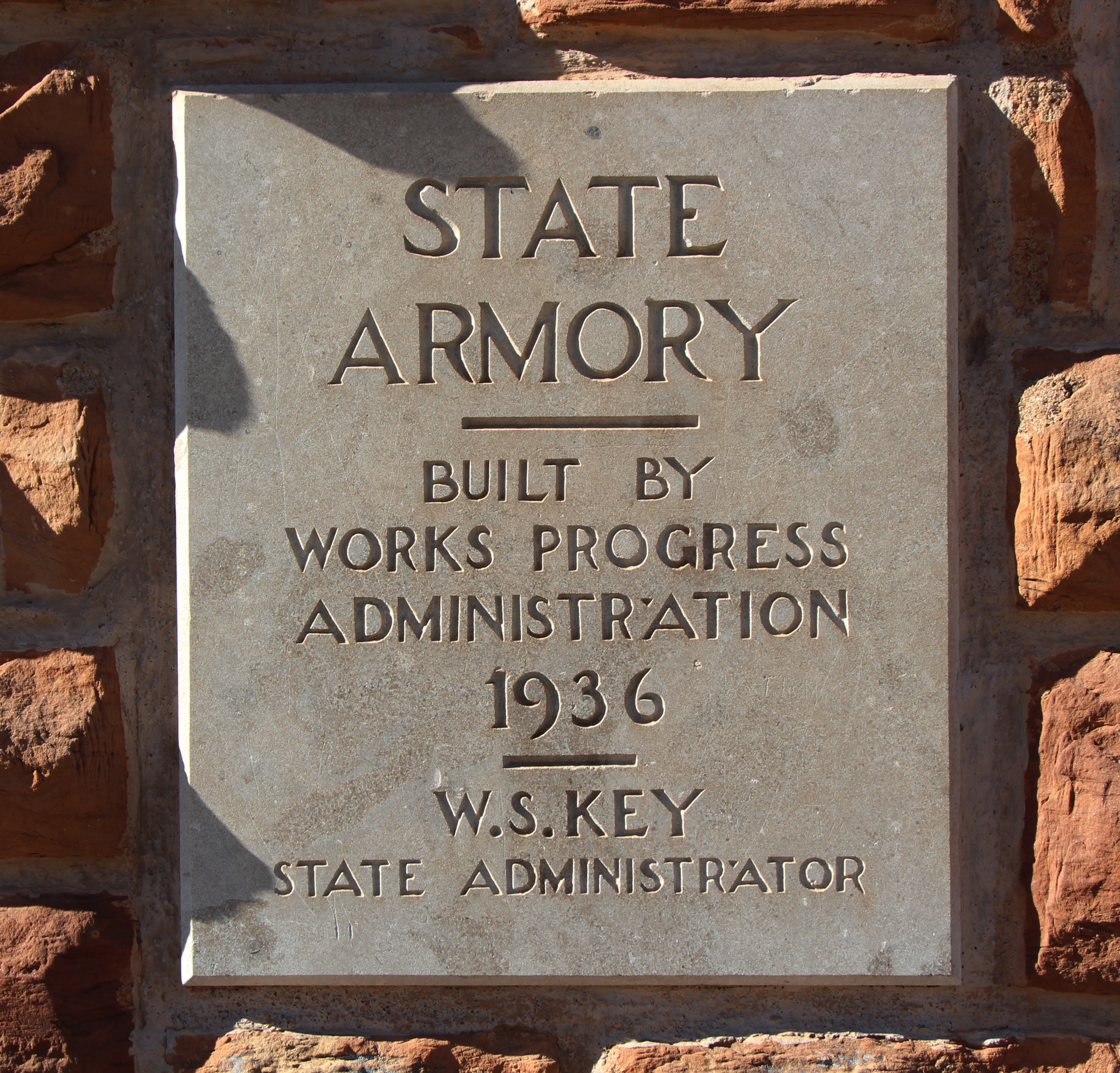
Perry Armory plaque
