= Morrison Baptist Church =

Historic church in Oklahoma, United States

- Morison Baptist Church
- U.S. National Register of Historic Places
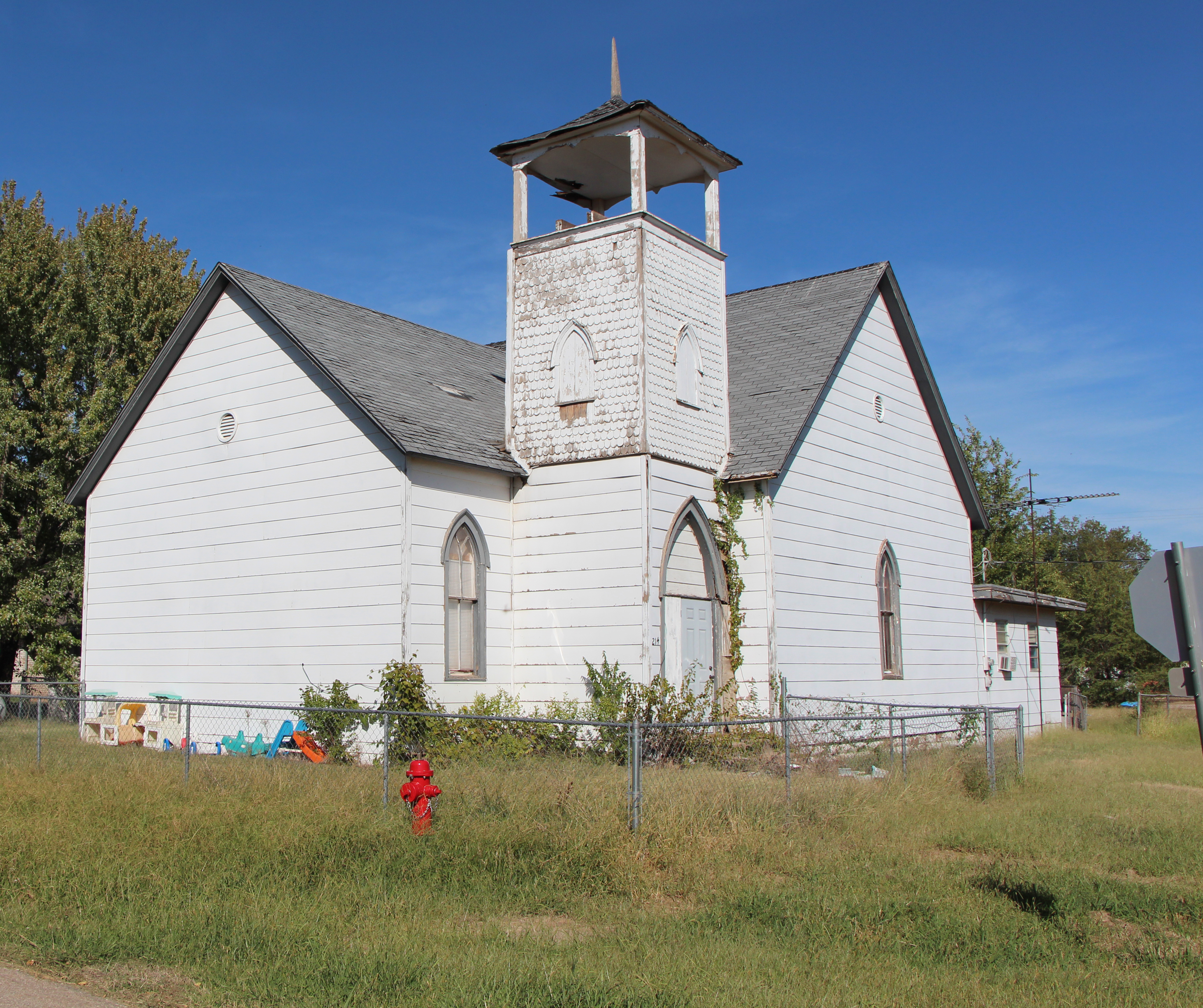

- Location within Oklahoma Location within the United States
- Location: 202 3rd St., Morrison, Oklahoma
- Coordinates: 36°17′55″N 97°0′27″W
- Area: less than one acre
- Built: 1903
- Architectural style: Carpenter Gothic
- MPS: Territorial Era Carpenter Gothic Churches TR
- NRHP reference No.: 84003357
- Added to NRHP: September 28, 1984

Morrison Baptist Church is a historic Baptist church in Morrison, Oklahoma.

It was built in 1903 and added to the National Register of Historic Places in 1984.
