= Wolleson–Nicewander Building =

Historic building in Perry, Oklahoma, US

- U.S. National Register of Historic Places
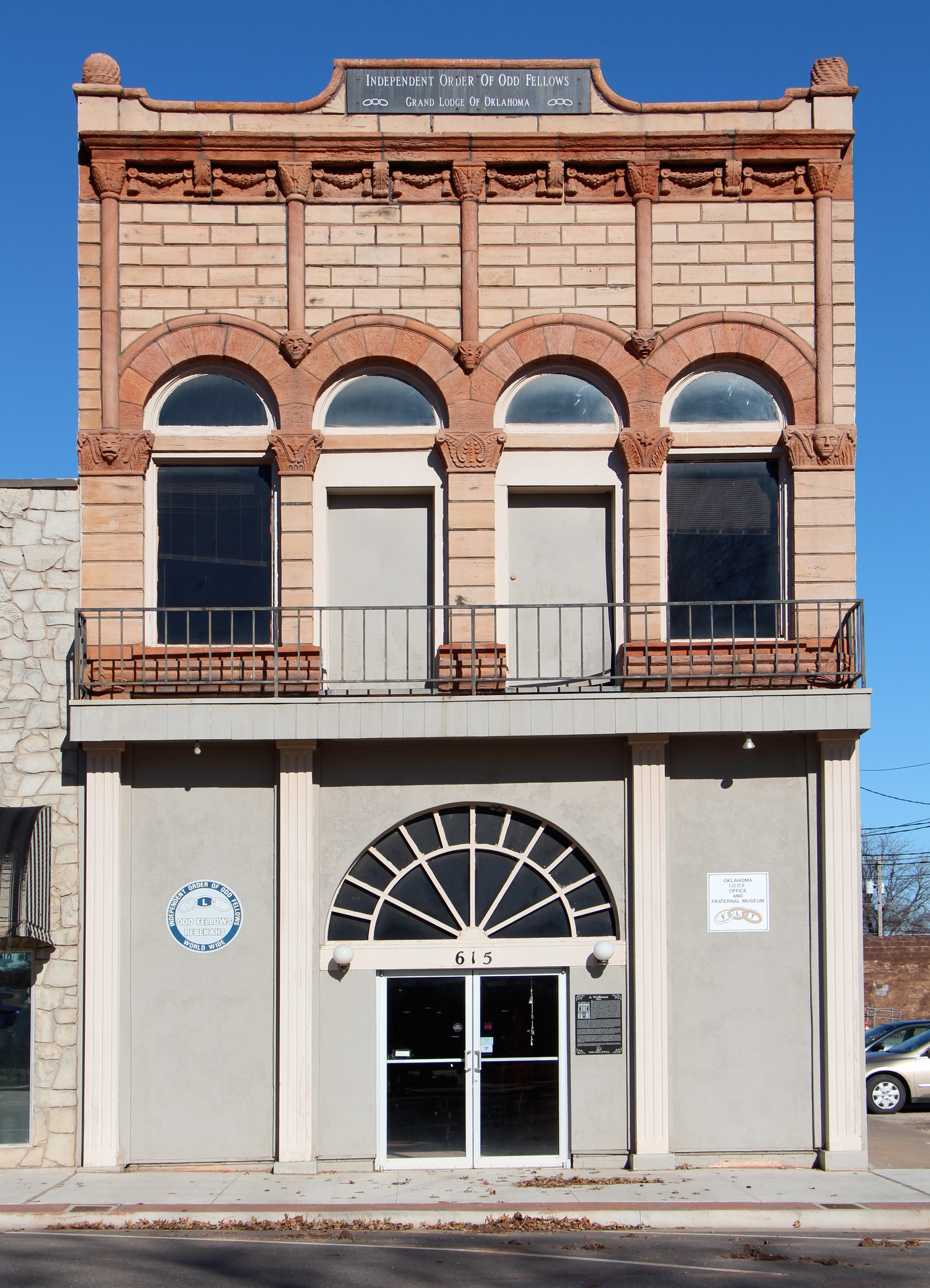

- Location within Oklahoma Location within the United States
- Location: 615 Delaware St., Perry, Oklahoma
- Coordinates: 36.2875°N 97.2867°W
- Area: less than one acre
- Built: 1900
- Architect: Wollenson, T.E.
- NRHP reference No.: 79002004
- Added to NRHP: May 16, 1979

The Wolleson–Nicewander Building, also known as the Triton Insurance Company Building, was built in 1900, and is within the Perry Courthouse Square Historic District in Perry, Oklahoma. Its builder, T. E. Wollenson, was a sailor and merchant who had immigrated from Denmark, and settled in Perry. Wollenson bought a lot on the north side of what is now called Courthouse Square. He then built a two-story building, that soon housed the Nicewander Clothing store. (Note: Some earlier sources show the clothing store owner's name as Nacewander, but the NRHP nomination concluded that Nicewander was the correct name.) Later occupants included a dry goods store, a tire and auto supply store, and an insurance company headquarters.

== History ==
The building was first occupied by T. E. Wollenson. According to Waymarking.com's description of this building, Wollenson opened his Boston Dry Goods Store on the lower floor, and operated it there until 1910. (Note: There are several discrepancies between the details given by Waymarking and those given in the earlier NRHP inventory. This article uses the NRHP information.) Mr. Nicewander later had a clothing store there, followed by N. C. Chapman who had a dry goods store, and then by P. Scobill who had a tire and auto supply store. In the 1960s the building became the headquarters of the Triton Insurance Group. The company redecorated the outside and inside of the building, including adding a huge map of the state of Oklahoma, still visible on its east side (photo below) The Triton Insurance Group left Perry in 1974.

== Description ==
The building footprint covers a plot that is 150 feet (46 m) by 100 feet (30 m). (Note: The legal designation is lots 9 and 10, Block 12 in Perry, Oklahoma.) The address is 615 Delaware in Perry. and included several naval motifs on the building (photos below). It is two stories, constructed of red brick and sandstone, in a Richardsonian Romanesque style. Four elongated vertical windows provide ventilation to the second floor rooms. Black-painted wrought iron railings provide some protection to the windows. A large double door with a horseshoe "rosette" on its top provide access to the building,

Originally, the facade of the first floor resembled that of the second floor, except that it was covered with a more modernistic light concrete veneer over the original red brick and sandstone. The second story retains the Romanesque arches and decorated lintels, which are supported by colonnettes. Each colonnette has a lion's head, reminiscent of the carved figureheads which adorned the prows of old seagoing vessels.

At the time of the NRHP inventory, the ground floor was divided into two large rooms, which were occupied by the Elwell Auto Supply store. The upper floor is divided into several rooms, which the Triton Life Insurance Company used as offices. They have been vacant since Triton moved out in 1974.

A large map of Oklahoma decorates the building's outer wall. The map shows the various stages of the history of Oklahoma and it was painted, together with other paintings that decorate the interior, by Adriano Ceciloni and Charles Wysocki.

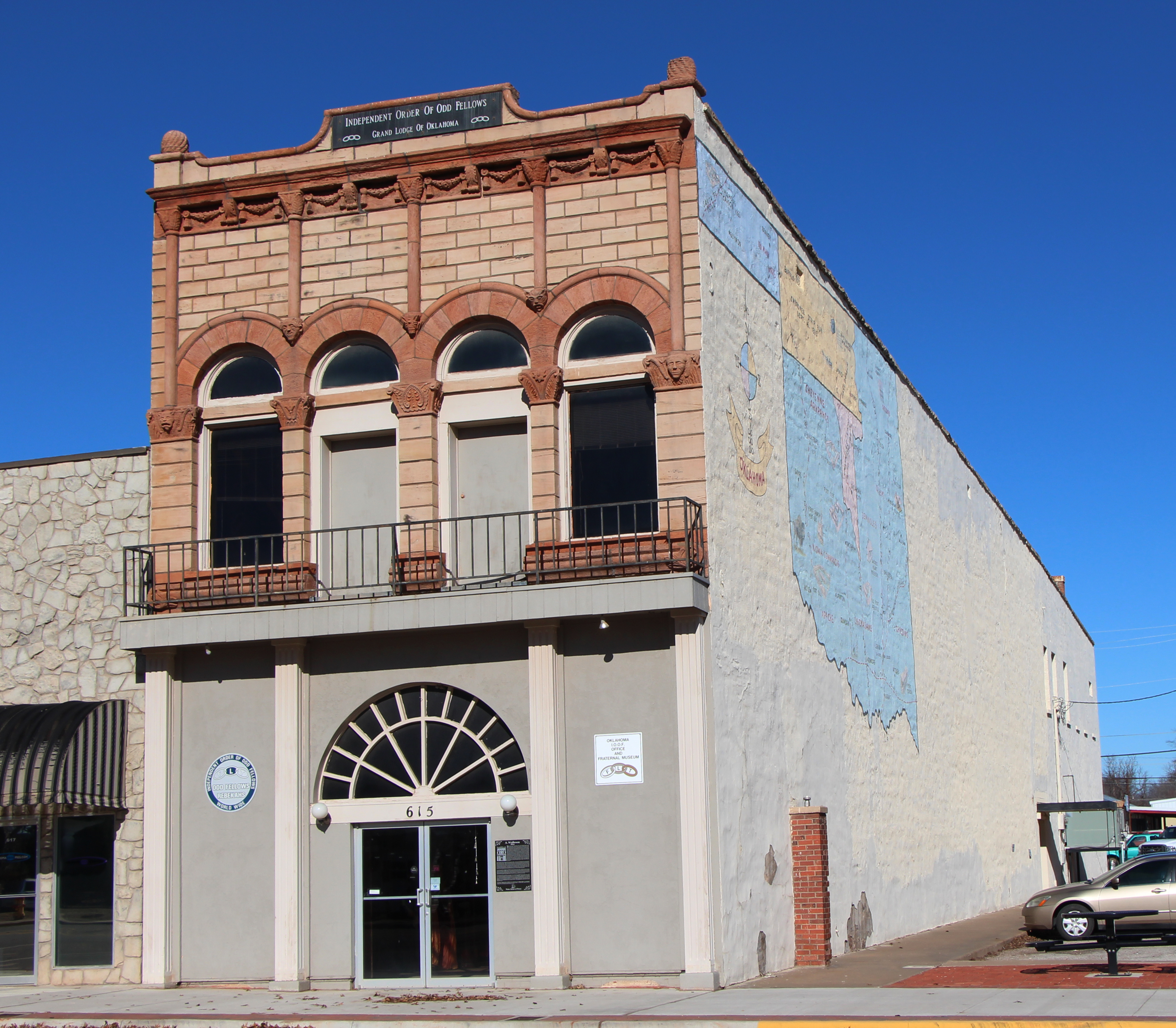
South and east facades

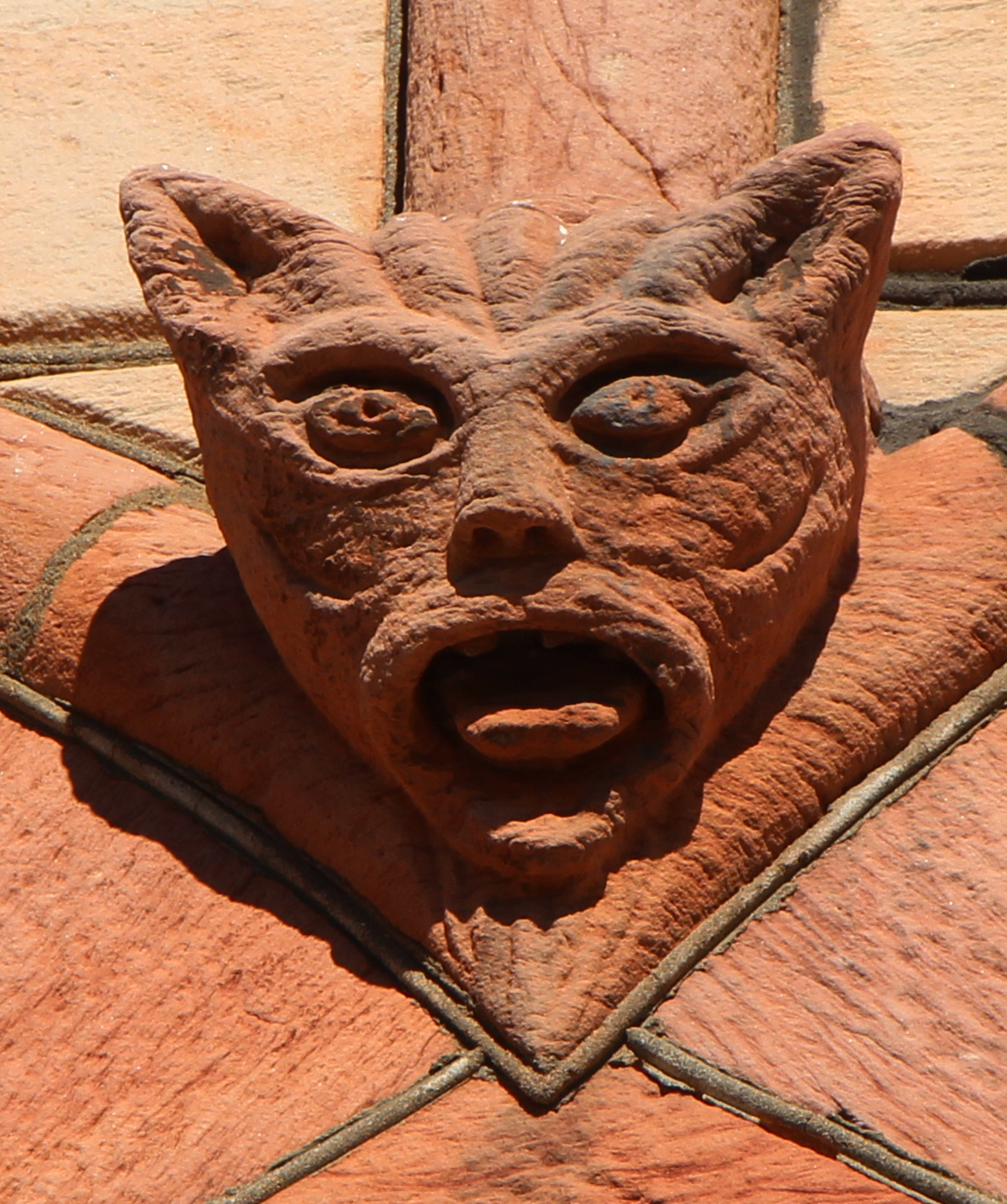
Lion's head on a colonnette. Each colonnette uses a different figure.

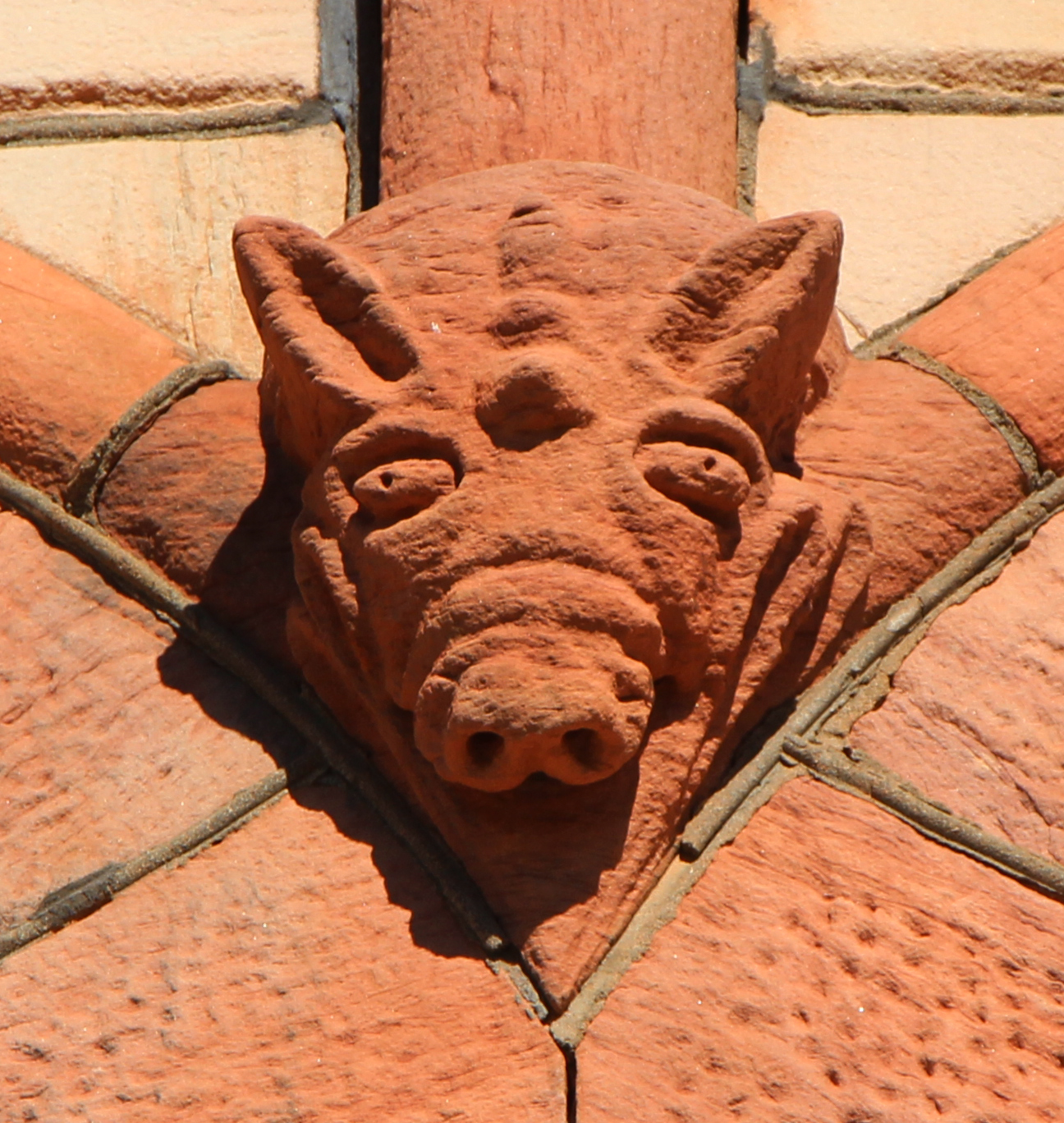
Another colonnette figure, each meant to evoke a ship's prow

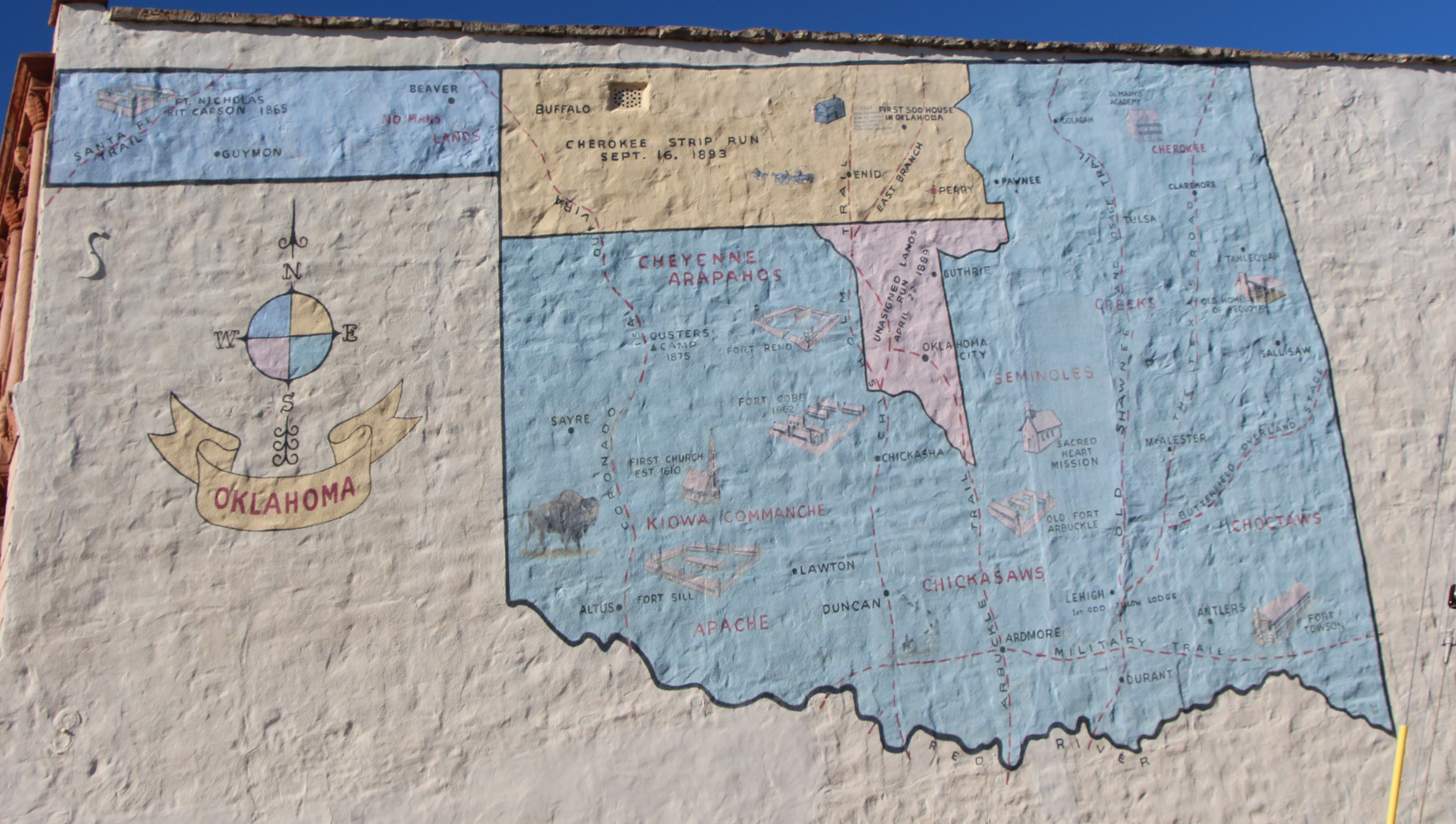
Large Oklahoma map painted on the east facade
