= First National Bank and Trust Company Building (Perry, Oklahoma) =

- U.S. National Register of Historic Places
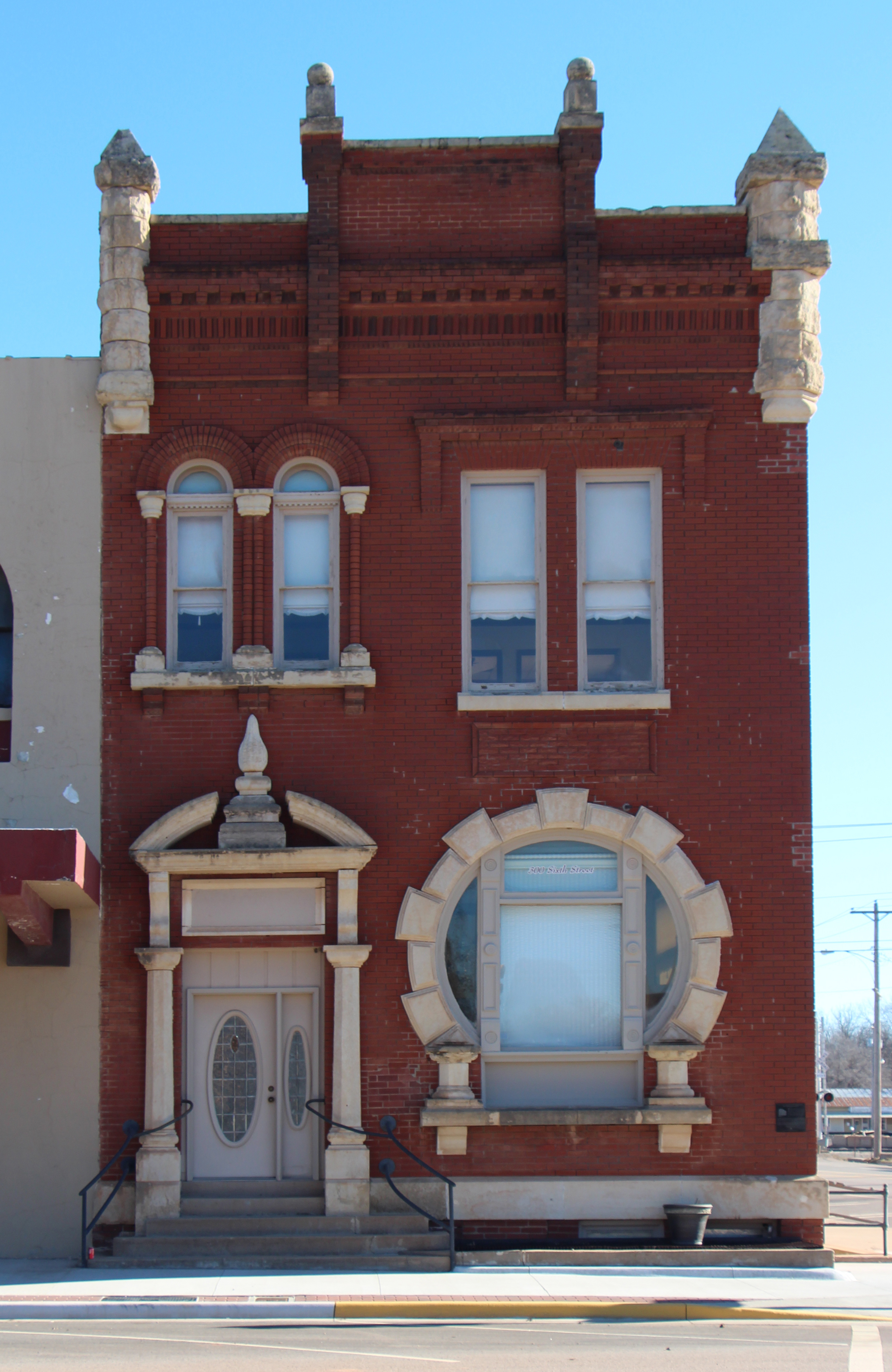
- First National Bank and Trust Company Building, January 4, 2015

- Location within Oklahoma Location within the United States
- Location: 300 W. 6th St., Perry, Oklahoma
- Coordinates: 36°17′10″N 97°17′7″W
- Area: less than one acre
- Built: 1902
- Architect: Joseph P. Foucart
- NRHP reference No.: 79002003
- Added to NRHP: May 16, 1979

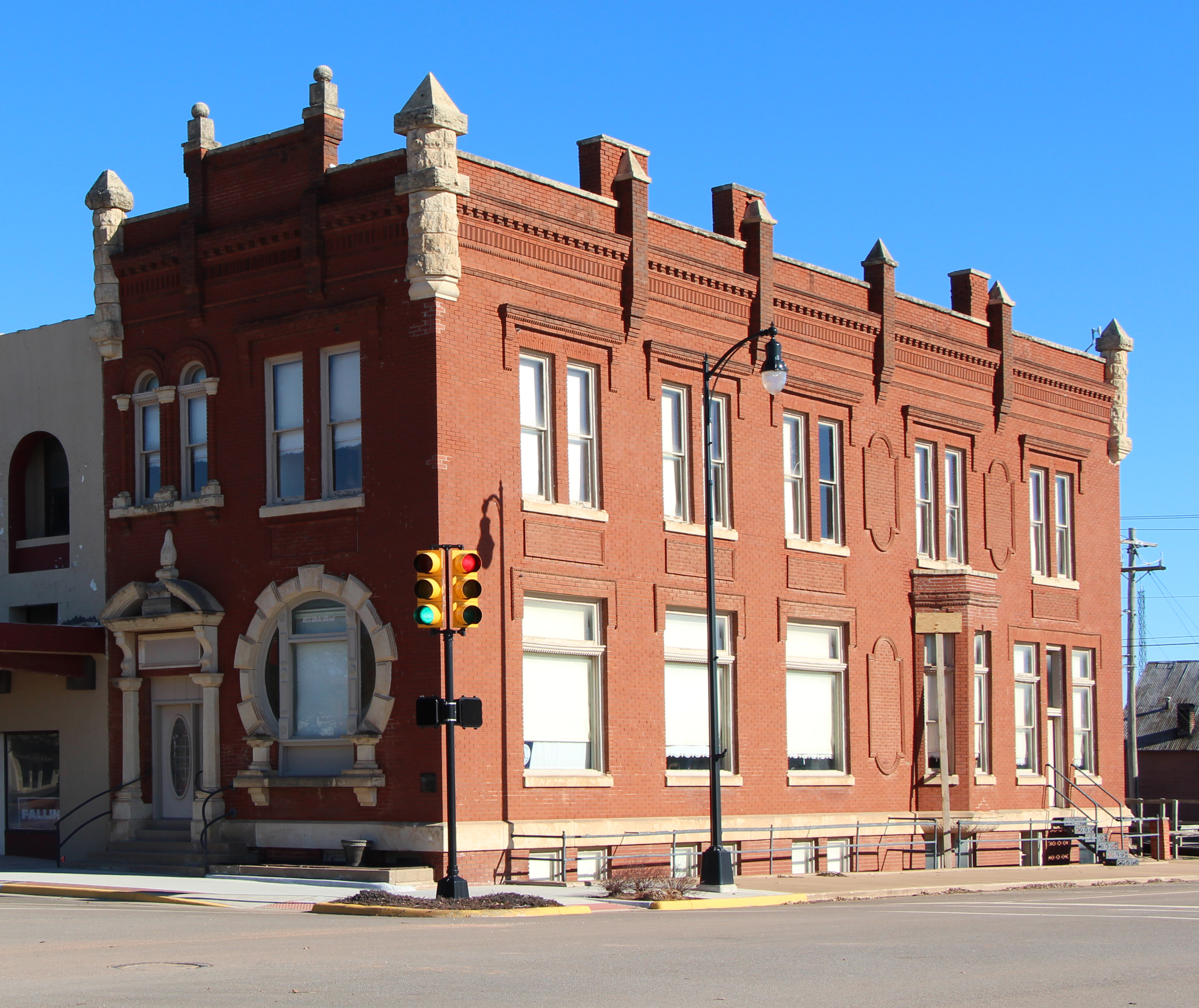

The First National Bank and Trust Company Building is a historic building located within the Perry Courthouse Square Historic District at the corner of 6th Street and Cedar Street (300 W. 6th St.) in Perry, Oklahoma. It was built in 1902 and listed on the National Register of Historic Places (NRHP) in 1979.

== Description ==
The two-story building is of the Italian Mannerist style, though described as having "a complete disregard for rigid architectural conventions." It was designed by Joseph Pierre Foucart, a prominent builder and architect of structures in Guthrie, Oklahoma, as well as the Williams Library (no longer existing) at Oklahoma State University. The building has been variously occupied by the Noble County Bank (1899–1903), The First National Bank and Trust Company of Perry (1903–1957), the First Union Life Insurance Company (1957–1975), and a dentist's office after 1975, on the first floor.

The building footprint covers a rectangular plot size of 24 feet (7.3 m) by 90 feet (27 m). (Note: Legal description of the real estate is Lot 27, Block 24, original townsite of Perry, Oklahoma.) It was constructed of pressed brick and sandstone, and was assessed in "excellent condition," at the time of the NRHP application. The building facade is decorated with white stone, wooden columns and towers. The ground floor has a horseshoe window of white stone, bordered by red brick, and a narrow door supported by wooden columns. The right side has five more windows, a bay window and a plain door. The upper story has two double windows on the front and five more windows on the right side of the building.

The building also has a basement, which housed the office and print shop of a German-language weekly newspaper, the Oklahoma Neuigkeiten, that was published from 1906 to 1925. (Note: Oklahoma State Historical Society has a collection of Oklahoma Neuigkeiten (Oklahoma News) issues from 1912, but says the paper began publication in 1902, and had a circulation of 1,500. It was one of 20 German-language newspapers published in Oklahoma.)

The basement also contains a massive strong box that is no longer used.

The interior of the first floor is divided into three rooms and a "strong box." Some walls are painted, while others have been wallpapered. Lighting is provided by antique chandeliers hanging from the ceiling. Yellow pine moldings outline the doors and windows. A wooden stairway with iron railings, covered with a dark red rug, leads upstairs, where a hallway provides access to six separate rooms. The walls of the rooms are all covered with antique wallpaper. "Chandeliers of exquisite design adorn the ceilings."(quote from NRHP Application).
