= National Register of Historic Places listings in Pawnee County, Oklahoma =

Location of Pawnee County in Oklahoma

This is a list of the National Register of Historic Places listings in Pawnee County, Oklahoma.

This is intended to be a complete list of the properties and districts on the National Register of Historic Places in Pawnee County, Oklahoma, United States. The locations of National Register properties and districts for which the latitude and longitude coordinates are included below, may be seen in a map.

There are 12 properties and districts listed on the National Register in the county.

This National Park Service list is complete through NPS recent listings posted May 1, 2026.

== Current listings ==
	Name on the Register	Image	Date listed	Location	City or town	Description
1	Arkansas Valley National Bank	Arkansas Valley National Bank	November 17, 1978 (#78002256)	547 6th St. 36°20′19″N 96°48′12″W	Pawnee	
2	Blackburn Methodist Church	Blackburn Methodist Church	September 28, 1984 (#84003398)	D St. and 4th Ave. 36°22′19″N 96°35′40″W	Blackburn	Now known as the Blackburn Cornerstone Church.
3	Blue Hawk Peak Ranch	Blue Hawk Peak Ranch	October 10, 1975 (#75001571)	West of Pawnee on U.S. Route 64; 36°19′33″N 96°48′45″W	Pawnee	2014 boundary increase, refnum 14000428
4	Corliss Steam Engine		May 7, 1979 (#79002016)	Pawnee County Fairgrounds; 36°20′48″N 96°47′39″W	Pawnee	
5	First State Bank of Maramec		June 5, 2007 (#07000514)	Junction of 2nd Ave. and Hickory St. 36°14′32″N 96°40′53″W	Maramec	Built in 1903 in Richardsonian Romanesque style, featuring a canted corner entryway and a fancy metal cornice. After the bank failed in the 1930’s, the building was a post office into the 1970’s, and later vacant. It has since collapsed.
6	Mullendore Mansion	Mullendore Mansion	June 22, 1984 (#84003402)	910 N. Phillips St. 36°19′05″N 96°27′40″W	Cleveland	
7	Pawnee Agency and Boarding School Historic District	Pawnee Agency and Boarding School Historic District	December 28, 2000 (#00001577)	Pawnee Tribal Reserve, east of Pawnee, roughly bounded by Morris Rd., following Harrison St. and Agency Rd. 36°20′08″N 96°47′24″W	Pawnee	
8	Pawnee Armory	Pawnee Armory	May 20, 1994 (#94000486)	Junction of 1st and Cleveland Sts. 36°19′57″N 96°47′42″W	Pawnee	
9	Pawnee County Courthouse	Pawnee County Courthouse	August 23, 1984 (#84003406)	500 Harrison St. 36°20′19″N 96°48′09″W	Pawnee	
10	Pawnee Indian Agency	Pawnee Indian Agency	April 11, 1973 (#73001567)	Eastern edge of Pawnee; 36°20′16″N 96°47′23″W	Pawnee	
11	Pawnee Municipal Swimming Pool and Bathhouse	Pawnee Municipal Swimming Pool and Bathhouse	September 2, 2003 (#03000873)	1.1 miles north and 0.35 miles east of the junction of U.S. Route 64 and State Highway 18; 36°21′21″N 96°48′19″W	Pawnee	
12	Ralston Opera House	Ralston Opera House	July 28, 1987 (#87001257)	501-503 Main St. 36°30′15″N 96°43′54″W	Ralston	

== See also ==
- List of National Historic Landmarks in Oklahoma
- National Register of Historic Places listings in Oklahoma
