= Pawnee County, Oklahoma =

County in Oklahoma, United States

- County
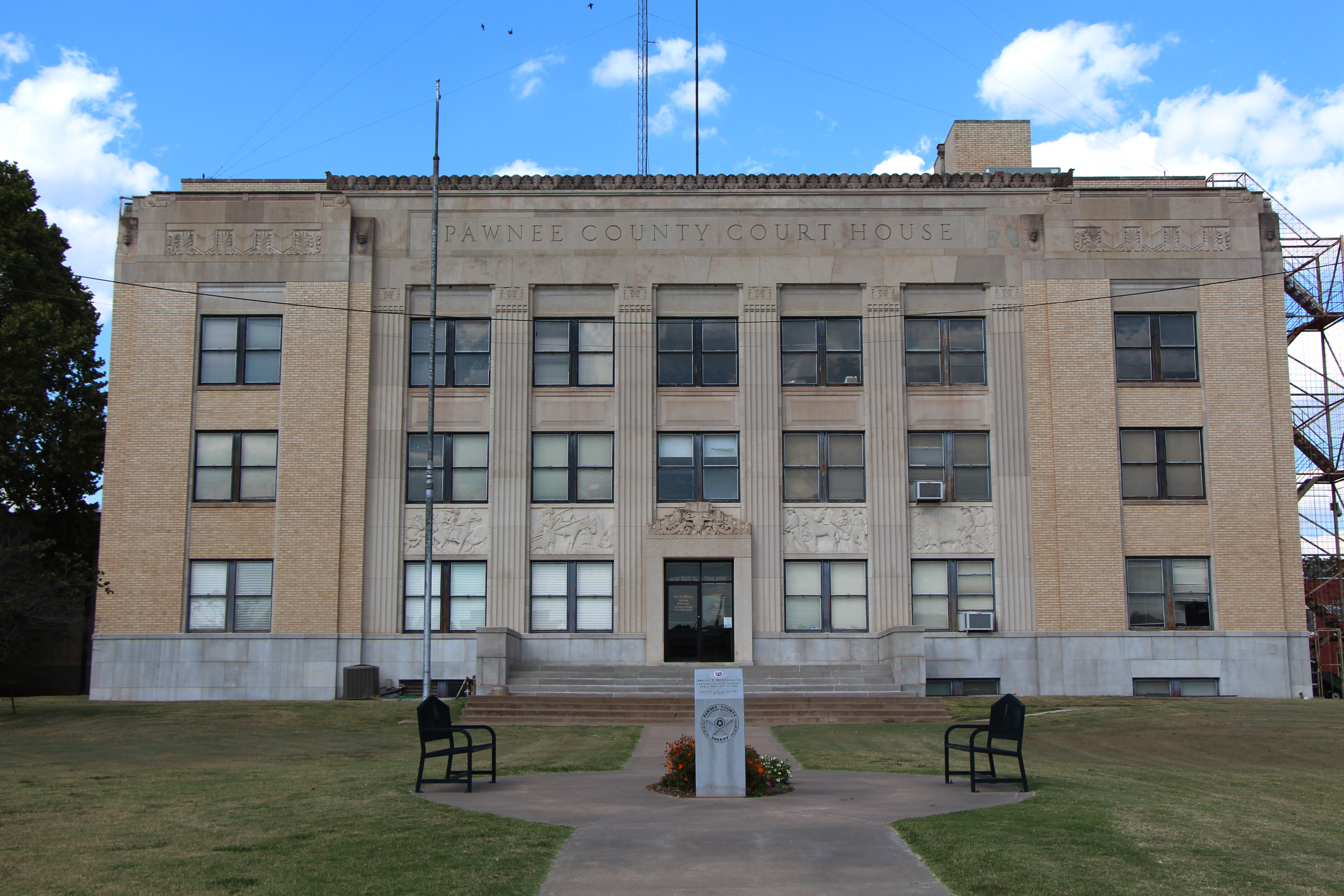
- Pawnee County Courthouse, 2014

- Location within the U.S. state of Oklahoma
- Coordinates: 36°19′N 96°42′W
- Country: United States
- State: Oklahoma
- Founded: 1893
- Named for: Pawnee Nation
- Seat: Pawnee
- Largest city: Cleveland

Area
  - Total: 595 sq mi (1,540 km^{2})
  - Land: 568 sq mi (1,470 km^{2})
  - Water: 27 sq mi (70 km^{2}) 4.5%

Population (2020)
  - Total: 15,553
  - Estimate (2025): 16,029 ▲
  - Density: 27.4/sq mi (10.6/km^{2})
- Congressional district: 3rd
- Website: pawneecountyok.org

Pawnee County is a county located in the U.S. state of Oklahoma. As of the 2020 census, the population was 15,553. Its county seat is Pawnee. The county is named after the Pawnee Nation, whose reservation used to encompass the county prior to allotment in 1893.

Pawnee County is included in the Tulsa metropolitan area.

== History ==
The Osage Nation used the area that contains present-day Pawnee County as buffalo hunting grounds. In 1825, The Osage ceded parts of present-day Missouri, Arkansas, and most of the future state of Oklahoma to the US federal government.

After their forced removal from the Southeastern United States, Cherokee people received land in Eastern Oklahoma as well as the Cherokee Outlet in 1828, which included present-day Pawnee County. After the Civil War, the Cherokee agreed to allow other American Indians to settle in the eastern portion of the outlet. According to the Tribal Historic Preservation Office of the Pawnee Nation, the Pawnee people sold their Nebraska reservation in 1874 and used those funds to purchase land from the Cherokee Nation and the Muscogee Nation to establish a home in the Indian Territory.

From the Pawnee Nation Historic Preservation Office, the Pawnee people were forced to sign an agreement in 1891 to take land allotments from the reservation or have their lands taken from them by eminent domain. The remaining lands were opened to non-Indian settlers in 1893. Pawnee County was organized as County Q, and the future town of Pawnee, Townsite Number 13, was designated the county seat. In 1894, the voters chose the name Pawnee County over the name Platte County.

The female bandit, Little Britches, companion in crime with Cattle Annie, lived for a time at Sinnett, site of the Muscogee (Creek) Nation in Pawnee County.

== Geography ==
According to the U.S. Census Bureau, the county has a total area of 595 square miles (1,540 km^{2}), of which 568 square miles (1,470 km^{2}) is land and 27 square miles (70 km^{2}) (4.5%) is water.

The western third of the county is part of the Red Bed plains, while the remainder is in the Sandstone Hills region. The Cimarron and Arkansas Rivers drain the county. Black Bear Creek also extends through the county. Lone Chimney Lake dam is also in Pawnee County, while the lake extends into Payne County.

=== Adjacent counties ===
- Osage County (northeast)
- Tulsa County (southeast)
- Creek County (south)
- Payne County (southwest)
- Noble County (west)

=== Earthquake ===
A magnitude 5.8 earthquake struck near the city of Pawnee, just after 7 a.m. (CST) on September 3, 2016. This was Oklahoma's strongest quake in history, exceeding the 5.7-magnitude quake near Prague on November 5, 2011. Buildings in Pawnee were damaged, but there were no reports of deaths. A Pawnee resident was injured while shielding his child from debris falling from a chimney. State regulators in Oklahoma ordered 37 petroleum production wastewater disposal wells in the vicinity of the earthquake (see map in citation) to be rapidly closed while assessments were made.

== Demographics ==
Historical population
Census	Pop.	Note	%±
1900	12,366		—
1910	17,332		40.2%
1920	19,126		10.4%
1930	19,882		4.0%
1940	17,395		−12.5%
1950	13,616		−21.7%
1960	10,884		−20.1%
1970	11,338		4.2%
1980	15,310		35.0%
1990	15,575		1.7%
2000	16,612		6.7%
2010	16,577		−0.2%
2020	15,553		−6.2%
2025 (est.)	16,029	▲	3.1%
U.S. Decennial Census; 1790-1960 1900-1990; 1990-2000 2010

=== 2020 census ===
As of the 2020 census, the county had a population of 15,553. Of the residents, 23.4% were under the age of 18 and 21.1% were 65 years of age or older; the median age was 43.4 years. For every 100 females there were 101.0 males, and for every 100 females age 18 and over there were 98.4 males.

The racial makeup of the county was 75.2% White, 0.5% Black or African American, 12.6% American Indian and Alaska Native, 0.3% Asian, 1.1% from some other race, and 10.3% from two or more races. Hispanic or Latino residents of any race comprised 3.0% of the population.

There were 6,056 households in the county, of which 30.5% had children under the age of 18 living with them and 23.1% had a female householder with no spouse or partner present. About 26.5% of all households were made up of individuals and 13.0% had someone living alone who was 65 years of age or older.

There were 7,276 housing units, of which 16.8% were vacant. Among occupied housing units, 77.6% were owner-occupied and 22.4% were renter-occupied. The homeowner vacancy rate was 2.5% and the rental vacancy rate was 16.5%.

=== 2000 census ===
As of the 2000 census, there were 16,612 people, 6,383 households, and 4,748 families residing in the county. The population density was 11/km^{2} (28/mi^{2}). There were 7,464 housing units at an average density of 5/km^{2} (13/mi^{2}). The racial makeup of the county was 82.27% White, 0.69% Black or African American, 12.13% Native American, 0.20% Asian, 0.05% Pacific Islander, 0.24% from other races, and 4.42% from two or more races. 1.16% of the population were Hispanic or Latino of any race.

In 2000, there were 6,383 households, out of which 32.60% had children under the age of 18 living with them, 61.60% were married couples living together, 9.00% had a female householder with no husband present, and 25.60% were non-families. 22.80% of all households were made up of individuals, and 11.00% had someone living alone who was 65 years of age or older. The average household size was 2.58 and the average family size was 3.02.

In the county, the population was spread out, with 26.50% under the age of 18, 7.30% from 18 to 24, 26.20% from 25 to 44, 25.20% from 45 to 64, and 14.80% who were 65 years of age or older. The median age was 38 years. For every 100 females, there were 97.40 males. For every 100 females age 18 and over, there were 94.40 males.

The median income for a household in the county was $31,661, and the median income for a family was $37,274. Males had a median income of $29,946 versus $21,069 for females. The per capita income for the county was $15,261. About 9.60% of families and 13.00% of the population were below the poverty line, including 16.60% of those under age 18 and 13.80% of those age 65 or over.

== Politics ==
Voter Registration and Party Enrollment as of June 30, 2023
Party	Number of Voters	Percentage
Democratic	2,244	23.76%
Republican	5,660	59.93%
Others	1,541	16.32%
Total	9,445	100%

United States presidential election results for Pawnee County, Oklahoma
Year	Republican		Democratic		Third party(ies)	
Year	No.	%	No.	%	No.	%
1908	1,556	46.32%	1,500	44.66%	303	9.02%
1912	1,332	42.69%	1,316	42.18%	472	15.13%
1916	1,396	40.44%	1,491	43.19%	565	16.37%
1920	2,976	56.12%	1,955	36.87%	372	7.01%
1924	3,093	51.37%	2,376	39.46%	552	9.17%
1928	4,489	68.82%	1,949	29.88%	85	1.30%
1932	2,280	31.32%	5,000	68.68%	0	0.00%
1936	2,961	41.92%	4,031	57.06%	72	1.02%
1940	3,991	53.47%	3,435	46.02%	38	0.51%
1944	3,310	57.21%	2,460	42.52%	16	0.28%
1948	2,651	49.35%	2,721	50.65%	0	0.00%
1952	3,975	63.61%	2,274	36.39%	0	0.00%
1956	3,390	59.96%	2,264	40.04%	0	0.00%
1960	3,153	65.80%	1,639	34.20%	0	0.00%
1964	2,278	48.81%	2,389	51.19%	0	0.00%
1968	2,437	51.09%	1,343	28.16%	990	20.75%
1972	4,280	77.30%	1,135	20.50%	122	2.20%
1976	3,111	50.17%	3,031	48.88%	59	0.95%
1980	3,902	63.44%	2,020	32.84%	229	3.72%
1984	4,699	67.83%	2,165	31.25%	64	0.92%
1988	3,324	53.94%	2,781	45.13%	57	0.93%
1992	2,675	38.36%	2,612	37.46%	1,686	24.18%
1996	2,560	42.62%	2,663	44.34%	783	13.04%
2000	3,386	57.15%	2,435	41.10%	104	1.76%
2004	4,412	63.25%	2,564	36.75%	0	0.00%
2008	4,533	68.72%	2,063	31.28%	0	0.00%
2012	4,232	70.01%	1,813	29.99%	0	0.00%
2016	4,729	74.31%	1,344	21.12%	291	4.57%
2020	5,267	77.62%	1,363	20.09%	156	2.30%
2024	5,405	78.56%	1,355	19.69%	120	1.74%

== Communities ==
=== Cities ===
- Cleveland
- Pawnee (county seat)

=== Towns ===
- Blackburn
- Hallett
- Jennings
- Maramec
- Oak Grove
- Ralston
- Skedee
- Terlton
- Westport

=== Unincorporated communities ===
- Mule Barn (former town)
- Quay (partially in Payne County/also a census-designated place)
- Shady Grove (former town)

== Education ==
K-12 school districts include:

- Cleveland Public Schools
- Frontier Public Schools
- Glencoe Public Schools
- Mannford Public Schools
- Morrison Public Schools
- Pawnee Public Schools
- Woodland Public Schools
- Yale Public Schools

Elementary school districts include:

- Jennings Public School
- Keystone Public School

== Transportation ==
=== Major highways ===
- US 64
- US 412 / Cimarron Turnpike
- SH-15
- SH-18
- SH-48
- SH-99
- SH-108

== NRHP sites ==
The following sites in Pawnee County are listed on the National Register of Historic Places:

- Arkansas Valley National Bank, Pawnee
- Blackburn Methodist Church, Blackburn
- Blue Hawk Peak Ranch, Pawnee
- Corliss Steam Engine, Pawnee
- First State Bank of Maramec, Maramec
- Mullendore Mansion, Cleveland
- Pawnee Agency and Boarding School Historic District, Pawnee
- Pawnee Armory, Pawnee
- Pawnee County Courthouse, Pawnee
- Pawnee Indian Agency, Pawnee
- Pawnee Municipal Swimming Pool and Bathhouse, Pawnee
- Ralston Opera House, Ralston
