= Pawnee County Courthouse =

Pawnee County Courthouse may refer to:

- Pawnee County Courthouse (Nebraska), Pawnee City, Nebraska
- Pawnee County Courthouse (Oklahoma), Pawnee, Oklahoma
