= Ralston Opera House =

- U.S. National Register of Historic Places
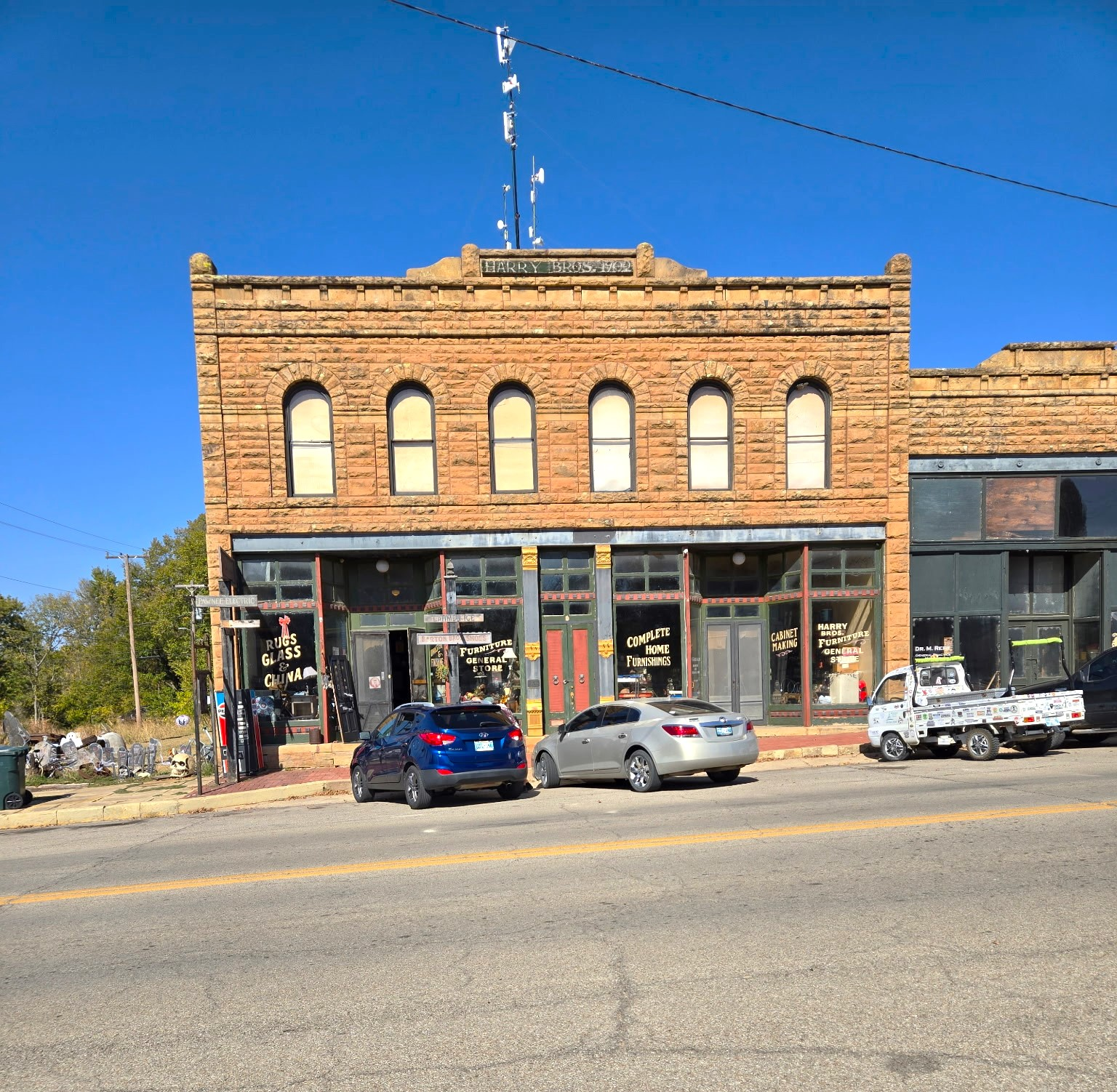
- Exterior, Ralston Opera House building in 2025

- Location within Oklahoma Location within the United States
- Location: 501-503 Main St., Ralston, Oklahoma
- Coordinates: 36.50413°N 96.73197°W
- Built: 1902
- NRHP reference No.: 87001257
- Added to NRHP: July 28, 1987

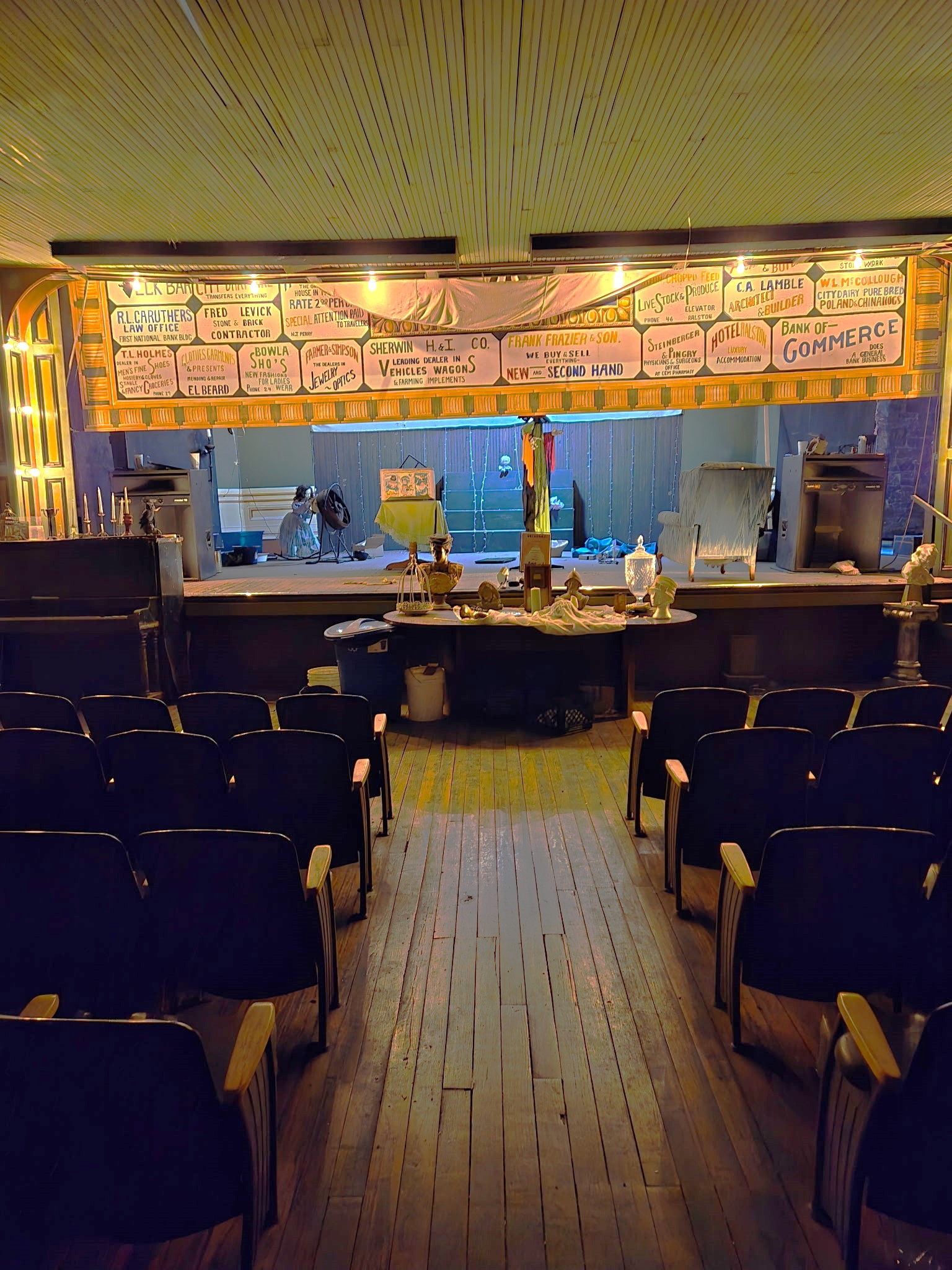
Opera House stage, 2025

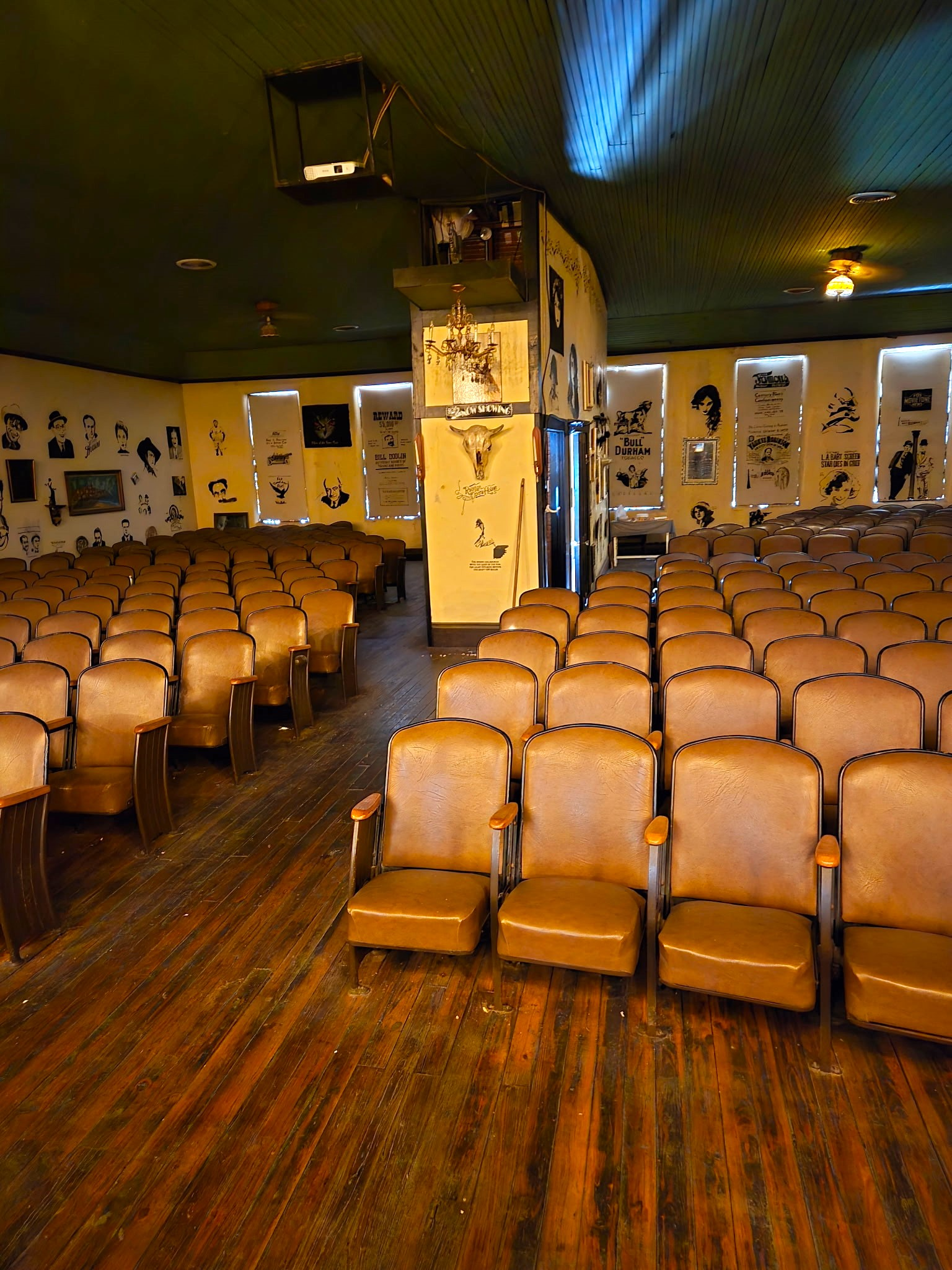
Opera House seating space, 2025

The Ralston Opera House occupies the second floor of the building located at 501-503 Main St. in the town of Ralston, Pawnee County, Oklahoma, an arrangement that was typical in smaller-town opera houses in Oklahoma. The building was constructed in 1902 out of native sandstone, and the first floor remained commercial space. The Opera House closed in 1927. It was added to the National Register of Historic Places listings in Pawnee County, Oklahoma on July 28, 1987.

== History ==
Despite the facility's name, the first performance in the 1902 Opera House was by the Mahara Minstrel Company. (Note: Per his autobiography, it is likely W.C. Handy was a member of Mahara’s Minstrels at that time, since he joined in 1894 and was with the group for "12 or 14 years.") The Opera House was constructed with a flat floor and with folding chairs that were easily stored out of the way, allowing the facility to be utilized as multi-purpose event space hosting over time such diverse functions as town meetings, dances, lectures, concerts, magic shows, political gatherings, juvenile operettas, business conferences, plays (oftentimes performed by traveling theater troupes), graduations, and even roller skating. “Moving pictures” were sometimes shown at least as early as 1906, and the space was regularly used for movies by the early 1920s. The Opera House closed in 1927.

Preservation attempts have been made since at least the mid-1980s when one Bill Hiser bought the building, but he died before his project could be seen through to completion. Around 2018, an Oklahoma preservation group declared the Opera House to be one of the state's most-endangered structures. Part of the problem in bringing the space back to usefulness is physical, including the single steep staircase that provides the only access to the second floor. But as always, lack of funding is a major issue.
