= Blackburn, Oklahoma =

- Town
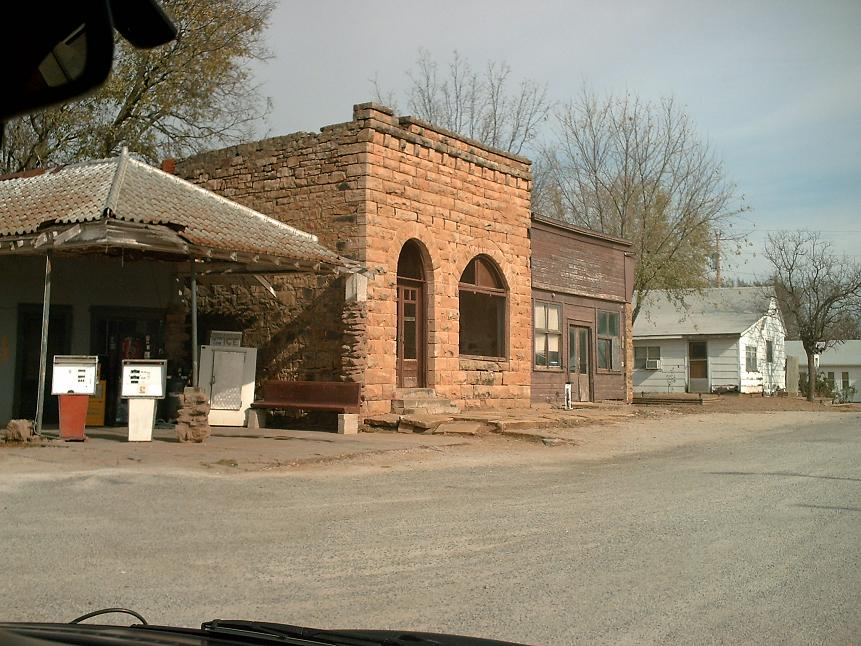
- Northern part of downtown Blackburn

- Location of Blackburn, Oklahoma
- Coordinates: 36°22′23″N 96°35′47″W
- Country: United States
- State: Oklahoma
- County: Pawnee

Area
  - Total: 0.32 sq mi (0.84 km^{2})
  - Land: 0.29 sq mi (0.76 km^{2})
  - Water: 0.027 sq mi (0.07 km^{2})
- Elevation: 810 ft (250 m)

Population (2020)
  - Total: 70
  - Density: 237.1/sq mi (91.53/km^{2})
- Time zone: UTC-6 (Central (CST))
  - Summer (DST): UTC-5 (CDT)
- FIPS code: 40-06450
- GNIS feature ID: 2411694

Blackburn is a town in Pawnee County, Oklahoma, United States. The population was 70 as of the 2020 Census. It is 12 miles (19 km) east of the city of Pawnee.

== History ==
Located on the south side of the Arkansas River at a natural ford, the community of Blackburn developed after the opening of the Cherokee Outlet on September 16, 1893. It was named for Kentucky Senator Joseph C. S. Blackburn. A post office was established December 15, 1893. Because it was located in Oklahoma Territory, Blackburn was a "whiskey town" that bordered Indian Territory until statehood in 1907. The town was incorporated April 21, 1909.

While historically Blackburn's economy was based on agriculture, in the twenty-first century, the town serves primarily as a bedroom community for commuters to Pawnee and other job centers.

== Geography ==
According to the United States Census Bureau, the town has a total area of 0.3 square miles (0.78 km^{2}), of which 0.3 square miles (0.78 km^{2}) is land and 0.04 square miles (0.10 km^{2}) (6.25%) is water.

== Demographics ==
Historical population
Census	Pop.	Note	%±
1910	335		—
1920	257		−23.3%
1930	219		−14.8%
1940	198		−9.6%
1950	135		−31.8%
1960	129		−4.4%
1970	88		−31.8%
1980	114		29.5%
1990	110		−3.5%
2000	102		−7.3%
2010	108		5.9%
2020	70		−35.2%
U.S. Decennial Census

=== 2020 census ===
As of the 2020 census, Blackburn had a population of 70. The median age was 44.5 years. 27.1% of residents were under the age of 18 and 20.0% of residents were 65 years of age or older. For every 100 females there were 100.0 males, and for every 100 females age 18 and over there were 112.5 males age 18 and over.

0.0% of residents lived in urban areas, while 100.0% lived in rural areas.

There were 27 households in Blackburn, of which 48.1% had children under the age of 18 living in them. Of all households, 66.7% were married-couple households, 3.7% were households with a male householder and no spouse or partner present, and 18.5% were households with a female householder and no spouse or partner present. About 3.7% of all households were made up of individuals and 0.0% had someone living alone who was 65 years of age or older.

There were 36 housing units, of which 25.0% were vacant. The homeowner vacancy rate was 0.0% and the rental vacancy rate was 0.0%.

Racial composition as of the 2020 census
Race	Number	Percent
White	49	70.0%
Black or African American	0	0.0%
American Indian and Alaska Native	10	14.3%
Asian	0	0.0%
Native Hawaiian and Other Pacific Islander	0	0.0%
Some other race	1	1.4%
Two or more races	10	14.3%
Hispanic or Latino (of any race)	2	2.9%

=== 2000 census ===
As of the census of 2000, there were 102 people, 41 households, and 25 families residing in the town. The population density was 342.2 inhabitants per square mile (132.1/km^{2}). There were 59 housing units at an average density of 197.9 per square mile (76.4/km^{2}). The racial makeup of the town was 88.24% White, 8.82% Native American, and 2.94% from two or more races.

There were 41 households, out of which 29.3% had children under the age of 18 living with them, 58.5% were married couples living together, and 39.0% were non-families. 39.0% of all households were made up of individuals, and 24.4% had someone living alone who was 65 years of age or older. The average household size was 2.49 and the average family size was 3.44.

In the town, the population was spread out, with 28.4% under the age of 18, 6.9% from 18 to 24, 26.5% from 25 to 44, 20.6% from 45 to 64, and 17.6% who were 65 years of age or older. The median age was 33 years. For every 100 females, there were 85.5 males. For every 100 females age 18 and over, there were 97.3 males.

The median income for a household in the town was $12,000, and the median income for a family was $30,625. Males had a median income of $28,750 versus $5,000 for females. The per capita income for the town was $8,668. There were 28.6% of families and 34.7% of the population living below the poverty line, including 40.9% of under eighteens and 38.5% of those over 64.

== Historic Site ==
Blackburn has the Blackburn Methodist Church, now known as the Blackburn Cornerstone Church, at D Street and 4th Avenue, classified as being a Territorial-era Carpenter Gothic church of North Central Oklahoma, built in 1904.
