= Quay, Oklahoma =

- Census-designated place
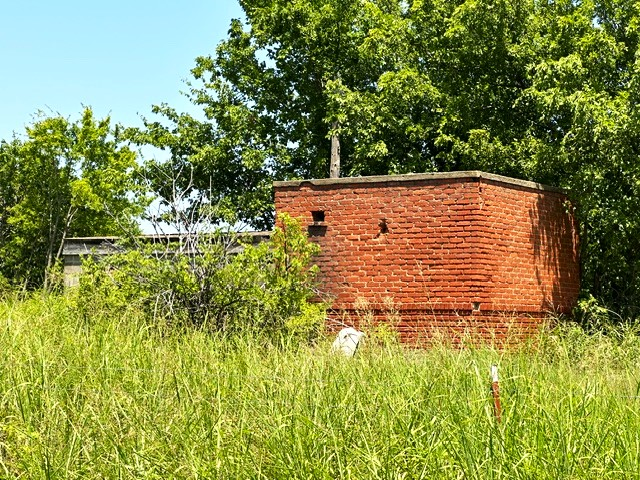
- Quay School Historic Site in July of 2026

- Location within Pawnee County and Oklahoma
- Coordinates: 36°09′35″N 96°42′32″W
- Country: United States
- State: Oklahoma
- Counties: Pawnee, Payne

Area
  - Total: 0.23 sq mi (0.60 km^{2})
  - Land: 0.23 sq mi (0.59 km^{2})
  - Water: 0.0039 sq mi (0.01 km^{2})
- Elevation: 915 ft (279 m)

Population (2020)
  - Total: 39
  - Density: 172.3/sq mi (66.54/km^{2})
- Time zone: UTC-6 (Central (CST))
  - Summer (DST): UTC-5 (CDT)
- FIPS code: 40-61450
- GNIS feature ID: 2412517

Quay is an unincorporated community and census-designated place (CDP) located on the boundary line between Pawnee and Payne counties in the U.S. state of Oklahoma. The population was 47 at the 2000 census, when it was still a town; the community disincorporated on August 23, 2000. No population was recorded in the census of 2010. But the 2020 Census recorded 39 persons. Originally named Lawson, it was renamed in 1903 in honor of Pennsylvania Senator Matthew Quay. The discovery of oil nearby caused the population to grow to about four thousand in the early 1920s before declining.

== History ==
This community was originally named Lawson, for the townsite owner, Stonewall J. Lawson. A post office was established here January 17, 1894. Lawman Heck Thomas and his posse killed outlaw Bill Doolin in Lawson in 1896. Lawson was renamed Quay in honor of Pennsylvania Senator Matthew Quay on February 24, 1903.

Initially, Quay was an agricultural center. The discovery of oil nearby caused the population to mushroom from about one hundred to about four thousand during the early 1920s. Oil production dried up and the town population declined to 186 at the 1930 census. (Note: The first census to record Quay's population was in 1930.)

The post office closed in 1957 and the school closed in 1965.

== Geography ==
According to the United States Census Bureau, the town had a total area of 0.2 square miles (0.5 km^{2}), all land.

== Demographics ==
Historical population
Census	Pop.	Note	%±
2000	47		—
2020	39		—
U.S. Decennial Census

=== 2020 census ===
As of the 2020 census, Quay had a population of 39. The median age was 46.5 years. 10.3% of residents were under the age of 18 and 15.4% of residents were 65 years of age or older. For every 100 females there were 85.7 males, and for every 100 females age 18 and over there were 84.2 males age 18 and over.

0.0% of residents lived in urban areas, while 100.0% lived in rural areas.

There were 8 households in Quay, of which 12.5% had children under the age of 18 living in them. Of all households, 50.0% were married-couple households, 0.0% were households with a male householder and no spouse or partner present, and 50.0% were households with a female householder and no spouse or partner present. About 50.0% of all households were made up of individuals and 50.0% had someone living alone who was 65 years of age or older.

There were 14 housing units, of which 42.9% were vacant. The homeowner vacancy rate was 0.0% and the rental vacancy rate was 50.0%.

Racial composition as of the 2020 census
Race	Number	Percent
White	25	64.1%
Black or African American	0	0.0%
American Indian and Alaska Native	7	17.9%
Asian	0	0.0%
Native Hawaiian and Other Pacific Islander	0	0.0%
Some other race	0	0.0%
Two or more races	7	17.9%
Hispanic or Latino (of any race)	1	2.6%

=== 2010 census ===
Quay disincorporated in August 2000, and no 2010 census figures were recorded.

=== 2000 census ===
As of the census of 2000, there were 47 people, 15 households, and 15 families residing in the town. The population density was 250.5 inhabitants per square mile (96.7/km^{2}). There were 20 housing units at an average density of 106.6 per square mile (41.2/km^{2}). The racial makeup of the town was 87.23% White, 2.13% Native American, and 10.64% from two or more races.

There were 15 households, out of which 46.7% had children under the age of 18 living with them, 86.7% were married couples living together, 6.7% had a female householder with no husband present, and 0.0% were non-families. No households were made up of individuals, and none had someone living alone who was 65 years of age or older. The average household size was 3.13 and the average family size was 3.13.

In the town the population was spread out, with 25.5% under the age of 18, 8.5% from 18 to 24, 25.5% from 25 to 44, 34.0% from 45 to 64, and 6.4% who were 65 years of age or older. The median age was 38 years. For every 100 females, there were 113.6 males. For every 100 females age 18 and over, there were 94.4 males.

The median income for a household in the town was $23,438, and the median income for a family was $24,063. Males had a median income of $26,875 versus $0 for females. The per capita income for the town was $9,736. There were 13.3% of families and 25.0% of the population living below the poverty line, including 80.0% of under eighteens and none of those over 64.

Employed residents commute to work, primarily in Stillwater.
