= Pawnee, Oklahoma =

Pawnee, Oklahoma Paári
- City
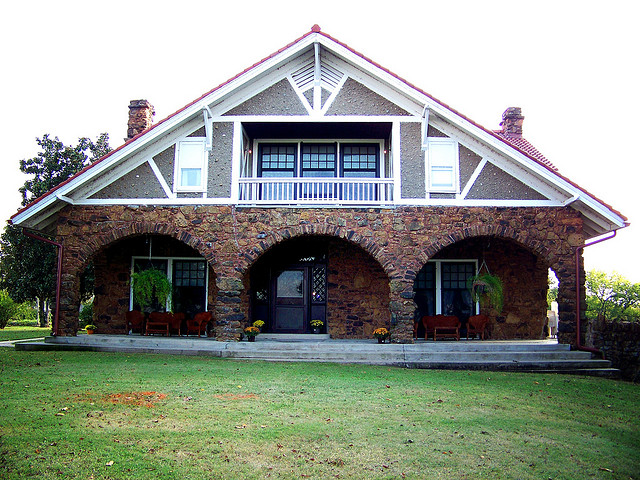
- Pawnee Bill Ranch and Museum
- Motto: "Where The West Remains"
- Location of Pawnee, Oklahoma
- Coordinates: 36°19′53″N 96°48′32″W
- Country: United States
- State: Oklahoma
- County: Pawnee

Area
  - Total: 3.62 sq mi (9.38 km^{2})
  - Land: 3.14 sq mi (8.13 km^{2})
  - Water: 0.48 sq mi (1.25 km^{2})
- Elevation: 873 ft (266 m)

Population (2020)
  - Total: 1,936
  - Density: 616.8/sq mi (238.14/km^{2})
- Time zone: UTC-6 (Central (CST))
  - Summer (DST): UTC-5 (CDT)
- ZIP code: 74058
- Area codes: 539/918
- FIPS code: 40-57650
- GNIS feature ID: 2411389
- Website: cityofpawnee.org

Pawnee (Pawnee: Paári, Iowa-Oto: Páñi Chína) is a city in and the county seat of Pawnee County, Oklahoma, United States. The town is northeast of Stillwater at the junction of U.S. Route 64 and State Highway 18.

It was named for the Pawnee tribe, which was relocated to this area between 1873 and 1875. The population was 1,936 as of the 2020 Census.

== History ==
The Pawnee Agency and Pawnee Boarding School were established after the Pawnee tribe came to this area in 1875. The Pawnee Agency was designated as a post office on May 4, 1876. The area was opened to non-Indian settlers on September 16, 1893, during the Cherokee Outlet Opening. Townsite Number Thirteen (later Pawnee) had been designated as the temporary county seat. The post office was redesignated from Pawnee Agency to Pawnee on October 26, 1893. The town incorporated on April 16, 1894. On September 9, 1895, the townspeople dedicated a stone county courthouse.

The Eastern Oklahoma Railway, which later became part of the Atchison, Topeka and Santa Fe Railway, built a line through Pawnee between 1900 and 1902. In 1902, the Arkansas Valley and Western Railway (later the St. Louis and San Francisco Railway) also built a line through the city. The railroads enabled Pawnee to develop as an agricultural trade center. The population was 1,943 at statehood in 1907. Since statehood, Pawnee has seen a overall decline in population with the 2020 Census reporting a population of 1,936.

Pawnee continued to develop during the Great Depression, largely because of Federal works projects. A hospital to care for the Ponca, Pawnee, Kaw, Otoe, and Tonkawa people opened January 15, 1931. A new school building at the Osage Agency opened in 1932. A new county courthouse was also built in 1932. Finally, the federal government built a reservoir named Pawnee Lake two miles north of town in 1932; the lake has 5.4 miles of shoreline, a surface area of 310 acres, and a maximum depth of 24.3 feet.

== Geography ==
According to the United States Census Bureau, the city has a total area of 2.2 square miles (5.7 km^{2}), all land.

== Demographics ==
Historical population
Census	Pop.	Note	%±
1900	1,464		—
1910	2,161		47.6%
1920	2,418		11.9%
1930	2,562		6.0%
1940	2,742		7.0%
1950	2,861		4.3%
1960	2,303		−19.5%
1970	2,443		6.1%
1980	1,688		−30.9%
1990	2,197		30.2%
2000	2,230		1.5%
2010	2,196		−1.5%
2020	1,936		−11.8%
U.S. Decennial Census

=== 2020 census ===
As of the 2020 census, Pawnee had a population of 1,936. The median age was 39.6 years. 24.3% of residents were under the age of 18 and 21.4% of residents were 65 years of age or older.

For every 100 females there were 92.8 males, and for every 100 females age 18 and over there were 87.8 males age 18 and over.

0% of residents lived in urban areas, while 100.0% lived in rural areas.

There were 736 households in Pawnee, of which 31.5% had children under the age of 18 living in them. Of all households, 39.9% were married-couple households, 17.0% were households with a male householder and no spouse or partner present, and 35.2% were households with a female householder and no spouse or partner present. About 32.5% of all households were made up of individuals and 15.7% had someone living alone who was 65 years of age or older.

There were 966 housing units, of which 23.8% were vacant. Among occupied housing units, 62.6% were owner-occupied and 37.4% were renter-occupied. The homeowner vacancy rate was 6.9% and the rental vacancy rate was 22.5%.

Racial composition as of the 2020 census
Race	Percent
White	53.4%
Black or African American	1.5%
American Indian and Alaska Native	35.3%
Asian	0%
Native Hawaiian and Other Pacific Islander	0%
Some other race	0.7%
Two or more races	9.1%
Hispanic or Latino (of any race)	2.9%

=== 2000 census ===
As of the 2000 census of 2000, there were 2,230 people, 878 households, and 581 families residing in the city. The population density was 1,015.4 inhabitants per square mile (392.0/km^{2}). There were 1,054 housing units at an average density of 479.9 per square mile (185.3/km^{2}). The racial makeup of the city was 63.18% White, 3.59% African American, 27.89% Native American, 0.18% from other races, and 5.16% from two or more races. Hispanic or Latino of any race were 1.03% of the population.

There were 878 households, out of which 33.3% had children under the age of 18 living with them, 45.7% were married couples living together, 17.2% had a female householder with no husband present, and 33.8% were non-families. 32.0% of all households were made up of individuals, and 16.5% had someone living alone who was 65 years of age or older. The average household size was 2.44 and the average family size was 3.08.

In the city, the population was spread out, with 27.4% under the age of 18, 7.3% from 18 to 24, 24.4% from 25 to 44, 22.7% from 45 to 64, and 18.2% who were 65 years of age or older. The median age was 39 years. For every 100 females, there were 84.3 males. For every 100 females age 18 and over, there were 80.6 males.

The median income for a household in the city was $24,962, and the median income for a family was $32,850. Males had a median income of $28,182 versus $20,139 for females. The per capita income for the city was $12,970. About 16.8% of families and 20.5% of the population were below the poverty line, including 25.9% of those under age 18 and 23.4% of those age 65 or over.

== Government ==
Pawnee has an aldermanic form of government.

== 2016 earthquake ==
A 5.8-magnitude earthquake struck near Pawnee on September 3, 2016, causing cracks and minor damage to buildings. It was the strongest recorded earthquake in state history, exceeding the 5.7 magnitude 2011 earthquake near Prague, Oklahoma. The earthquake was caused by the deep injection of wastewater created by the practice of fracking to release oil trapped in shale rock.

== Items of interest ==
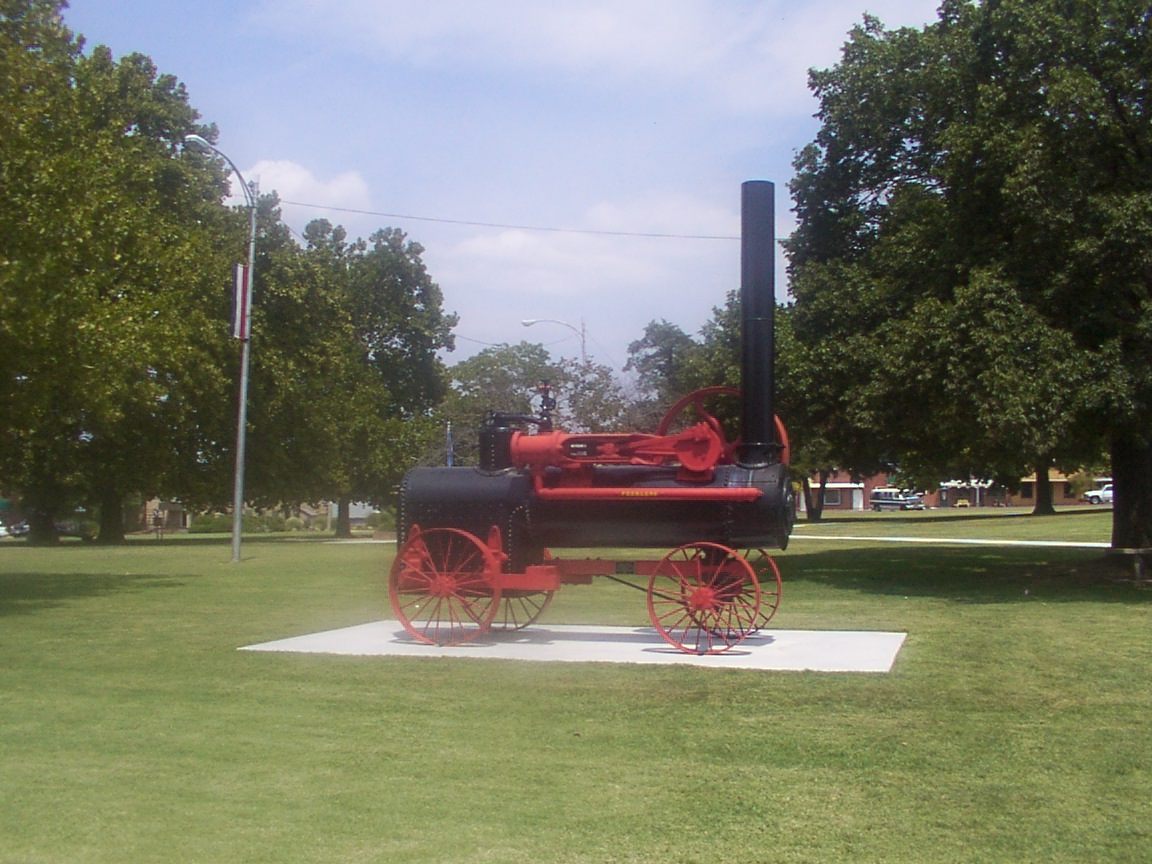
Peerless Steam Threshing Engine (Corliss engine) on Static Display at Pawnee County Courthouse

- The Pawnee Indian Veterans Homecoming and Powwow, which occurs the weekend that falls closest to the 4th of July.
- Served by Meridian Technology Center
- Pawnee High School
- Home of the Pawnee people and government.
- Pawnee Lake, consisting of 530 surface acres with boating, fishing, and camping, and having a 9-hole golf course and horse facilities adjacent.
- Pawnee Bill Historical Museum, with exhibits related to Pawnee Bill, the Wild West Shows and the Pawnees.
- Oklahoma Steam and Gas Engine Show. This annual event by the Oklahoma Steam Threshers and Gas Engine Association is during the first Friday, Saturday and Sunday in May.
- Pawnee Bill Memorial Rodeo. The event typically includes a Western Heritage Week, a Draft Horse and Mule Sale, an "Old Time Saturday Night" Car-Cruze-In, a youth rodeo, and a Ranch Rodeo.
- Pawnee Bill’s Original Wild West Show
- Large Dick Tracy wall mural
- Pawnee County Historical Society Museum & Dick Tracy Headquarters. The Museum preserves the names, places and history of the Pawnee community, displays artifacts from area ghost towns, shows pieces of Pawnee Tribe history, and showcases Dick Tracy memorabilia.

== Historic sites ==
Eight of 12 NRHP-listed sites in Pawnee County are located in Pawnee, including:

- Arkansas Valley National Bank
- Blue Hawk Peak Ranch, a/k/a the Pawnee Bill Ranch
- Corliss Steam Engine, at the Pawnee County Fairgrounds
- Pawnee Agency and Boarding School Historic District
- Pawnee Armory
- Pawnee County Courthouse
- Pawnee Indian Agency
- Pawnee Municipal Swimming Pool and Bathhouse

== Notable people ==
- Kenneth D. Bailey, Medal of Honor recipient
- Bill Bredde, Football defensive back and halfback who played for Oklahoma State University and the Chicago Cardinals in 1954.
- Carter Camp, Native American activist
- Ernest E. Evans, Lieutenant Commander, United States Navy, Medal of Honor recipient for action as commander of Destroyer USS Johnston (DD-557) off Samar Island, Philippines, 1944
- Chester Gould, cartoonist, creator of Dick Tracy
- Saginaw Grant, actor, dancer, and motivational speaker
- Clyde LeForce, selected by the Detroit Lions in the 19th round of the 1945 NFL Draft
- Gordon W. Lillie (aka Pawnee Bill), Wild West Show presenter
- May Lillie, Wild West Show performer, sharpshooter and equestrian
- John J. Mathews, historian
- Neil E. McNeil, was city and county judge of Pawnee (1905–11), then Associate Justice of the Oklahoma Supreme Court (1914-1919)
- Steve Ripley, musician, leader of The Tractors
- Jennie Stevenson (aka Little Britches), female bandit associated with her companion in crime, Cattle Annie, escaped from custody temporarily from a restaurant in Pawnee in 1895.
- Della Warrior (b. 1946), born in Pawnee, served as first (and so far, only) female chair of the Otoe-Missouria Tribe. Also was president of the Institute of American Indian Arts.
- Moses J. "Chief" YellowHorse, first full blooded Native American Pro Baseball Player (Pittsburgh Pirates, 1921-2)
