= Pawnee Municipal Swimming Pool and Bathhouse =

- Pawnee Bathhouse
- U.S. National Register of Historic Places
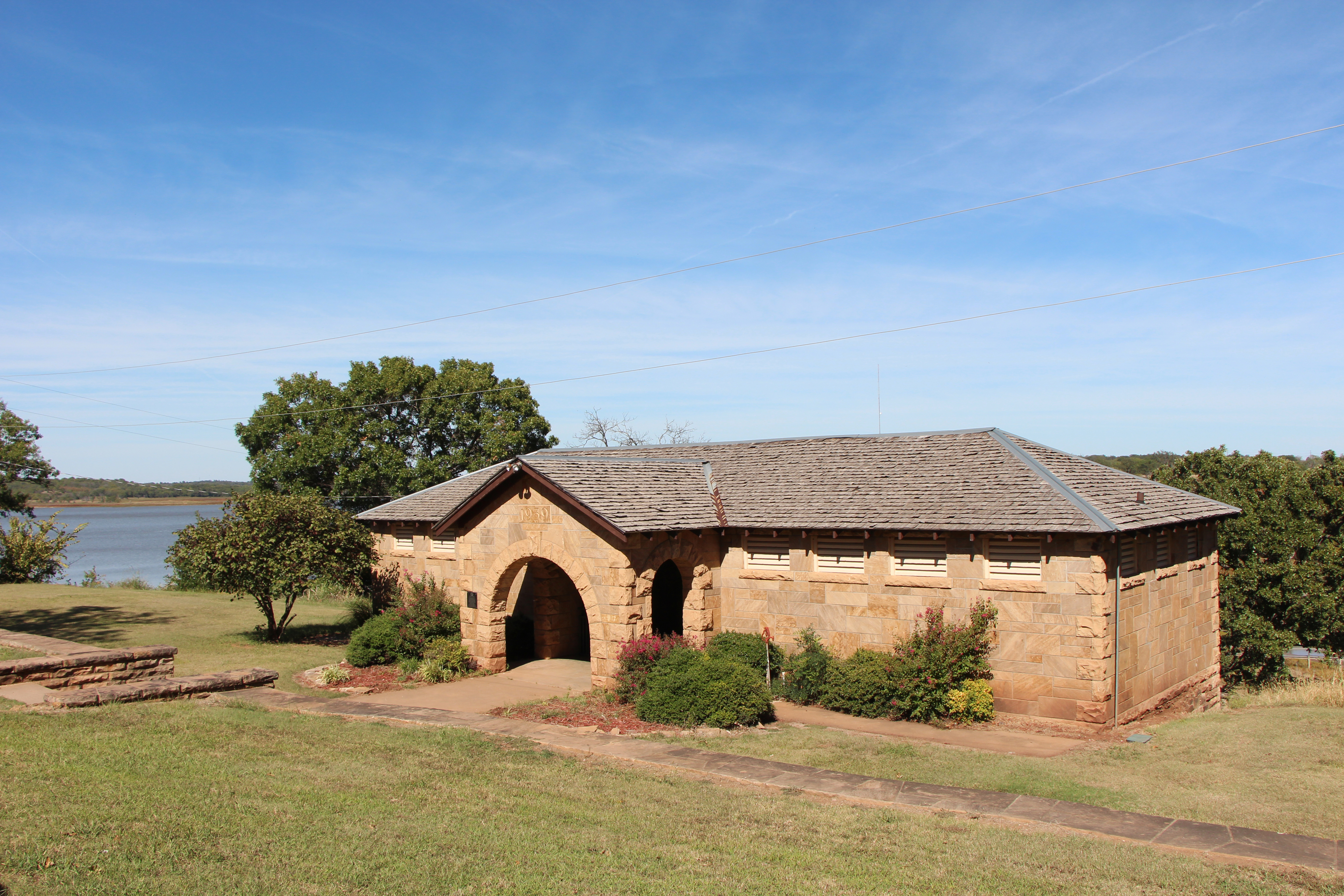
- Pawnee Bathhouse, west elevation

- Location within Oklahoma Location within the United States
- Location: Pawnee County, Oklahoma
- Nearest city: Pawnee, Oklahoma
- Coordinates: 36°21′21″N 96°48′19″W
- Built: 1937
- Built by: Works Progress Administration, Federal Emergency Relief Administration
- Architectural style: WPA Standardized Style
- NRHP reference No.: 03000873
- Added to NRHP: September 2, 2003

The Pawnee Municipal Swimming Pool and Bathhouse were erected by the Federal Emergency Relief Administration (FERA) and the Works Progress Administration (WPA) in the 1930s. The swimming pool, built in 1937, covers three acres. The Bathhouse was constructed in 1939 of native stone. The west side of the bathhouse is one-story and is typical of WPA-built buildings in the state, while the east side is two-story and more elaborate.

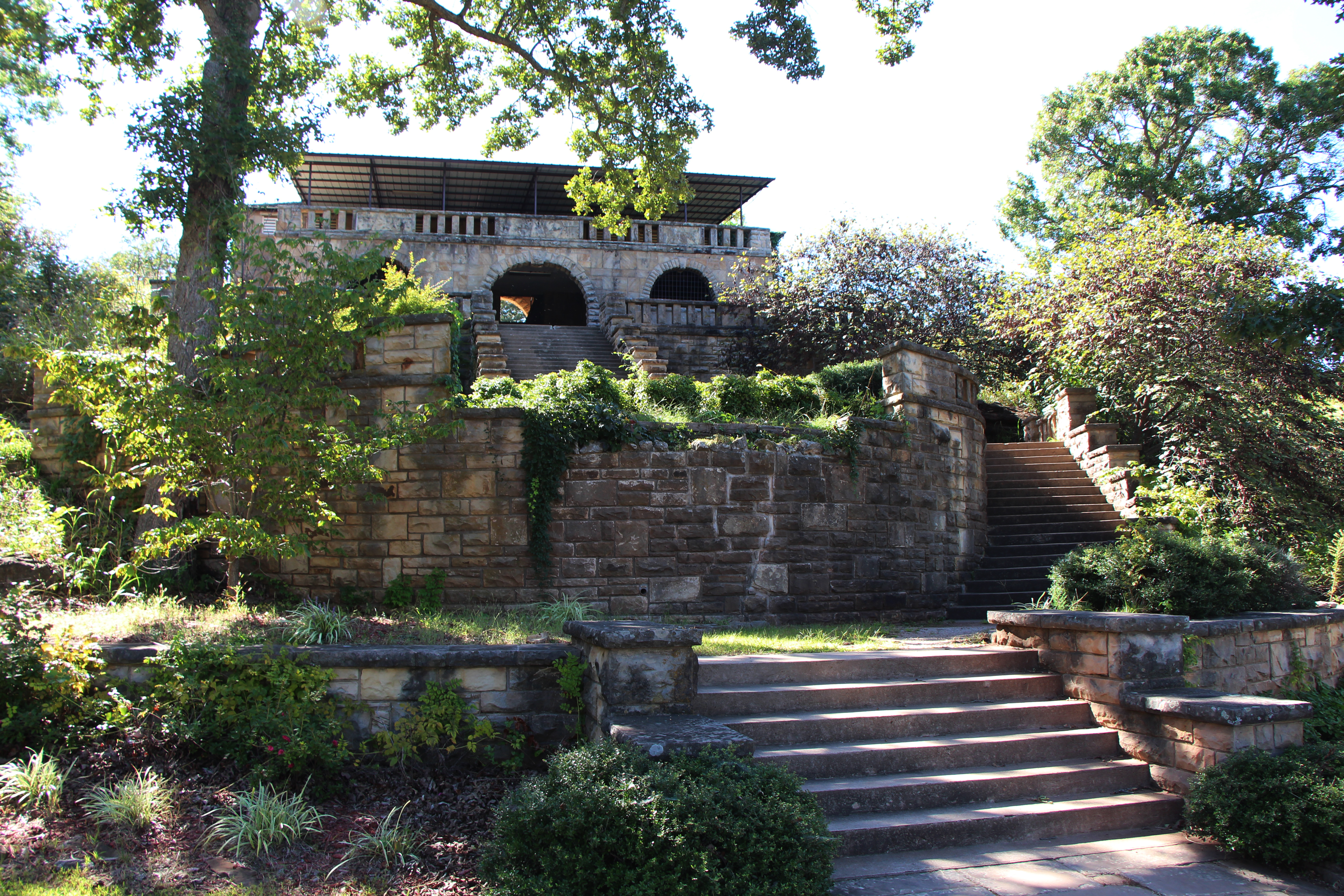
Pawnee Bathhouse, east side.

== See also ==
- National Register of Historic Places listings in Pawnee County, Oklahoma
