= Cleveland, Oklahoma =

- City
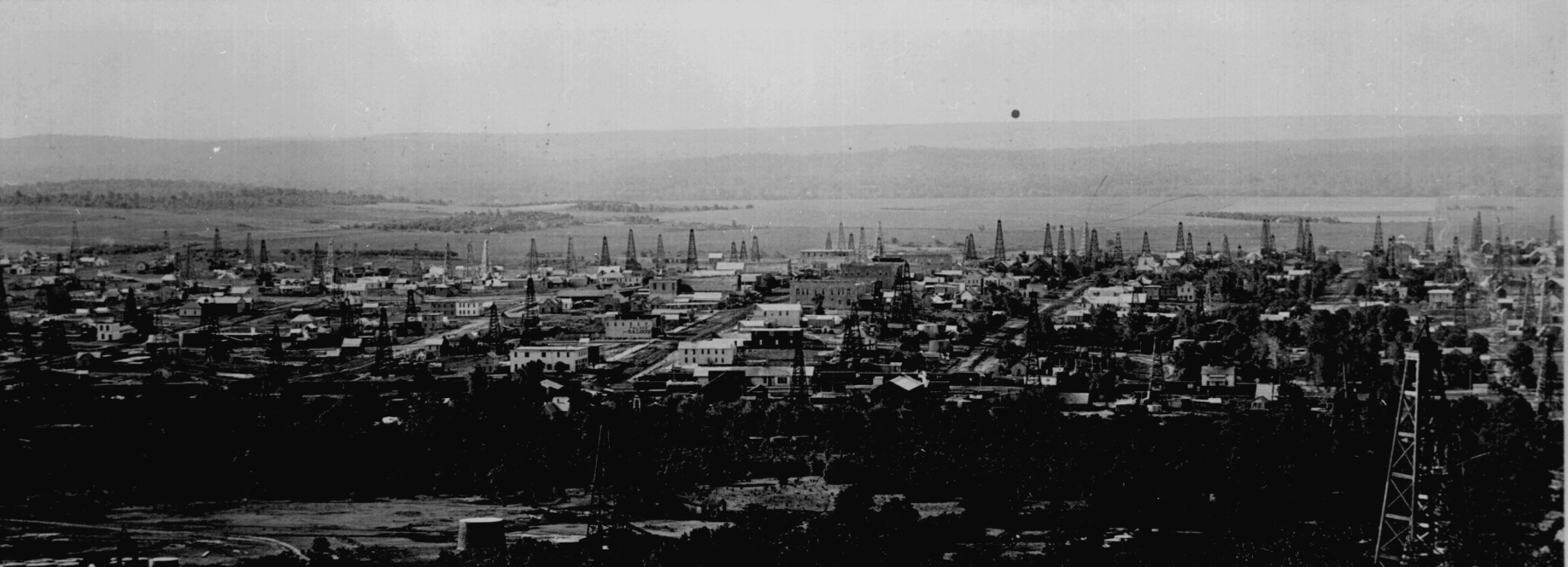
- Panoramic view of Cleveland in 1905, a year after the discovery of oil
- Nickname: Oklahoma's Pioneer Oil City
- Location within Pawnee County and Oklahoma
- Coordinates: 36°18′44″N 96°28′18″W
- Country: United States
- State: Oklahoma
- County: Pawnee
- Established: 1894

Area
  - Total: 2.69 sq mi (6.96 km^{2})
  - Land: 2.68 sq mi (6.95 km^{2})
  - Water: 0.0039 sq mi (0.01 km^{2})
- Elevation: 791 ft (241 m)

Population (2020)
  - Total: 3,205
  - Density: 1,194.1/sq mi (461.03/km^{2})
- Time zone: UTC-6 (Central (CST))
  - Summer (DST): UTC-5 (CDT)
- ZIP code: 74020
- Area codes: 539/918
- FIPS code: 40-15350
- GNIS feature ID: 2409481
- Website: City website

Cleveland is a city in Pawnee County, Oklahoma, United States. The population was 3,205 as of the 2020 Census.

== History ==
After the Cherokee Outlet opening, a homesteader by the name of Willis H. Herbert established a town named Herbert by opening a post office on the current townsite of Cleveland on October 28, 1893. The Post Office department subsequently withdrew the approval of the Herbert post office. The post office was then moved 100 feet, and reestablished under the name Cleveland, named in honor of then President Grover Cleveland on April 19, 1894. By 1900, the town's population was 211. Before the discovery of oil in the area, the town served as a trade center between the local farmers and the Osage Tribe who lived on the reservation on the other side of the Arkansas river.

In 1904, a railroad line owned by the Missouri, Kansas and Oklahoma Railroad (later known as Missouri, Kansas and Texas Railway or Katy) from Oklahoma City reached Cleveland and crossed the Arkansas River into Osage County. On May 27, 1904, the first oil well was spudded near the community, and it caused an influx of oil workers and other people. At the time of statehood in 1907, Cleveland had 1,441 residents.

== Geography ==
According to the United States Census Bureau, the city has a total area of 2.6 square miles (6.7 km^{2}), of which 2.6 square miles (6.7 km^{2}) is land and 0.38% is water.

== Demographics ==
Historical population
Census	Pop.	Note	%±
1900	211		—
1910	1,310		520.9%
1920	2,717		107.4%
1930	2,959		8.9%
1940	2,510		−15.2%
1950	2,464		−1.8%
1960	2,519		2.2%
1970	2,573		2.1%
1980	2,972		15.5%
1990	3,156		6.2%
2000	3,282		4.0%
2010	3,251		−0.9%
2020	3,205		−1.4%
U.S. Decennial Census

=== 2020 census ===
As of the 2020 census, Cleveland had a population of 3,205. The median age was 39.9 years. 24.7% of residents were under the age of 18 and 19.8% of residents were 65 years of age or older. For every 100 females there were 92.1 males, and for every 100 females age 18 and over there were 87.7 males age 18 and over.

0% of residents lived in urban areas, while 100.0% lived in rural areas.

There were 1,273 households in Cleveland, of which 31.3% had children under the age of 18 living in them. Of all households, 43.5% were married-couple households, 18.8% were households with a male householder and no spouse or partner present, and 31.1% were households with a female householder and no spouse or partner present. About 33.0% of all households were made up of individuals and 16.1% had someone living alone who was 65 years of age or older.

There were 1,530 housing units, of which 16.8% were vacant. Among occupied housing units, 56.4% were owner-occupied and 43.6% were renter-occupied. The homeowner vacancy rate was 2.0% and the rental vacancy rate was 13.7%.

Racial composition as of the 2020 census
Race	Percent
White	77.6%
Black or African American	0.8%
American Indian and Alaska Native	9.5%
Asian	0.6%
Native Hawaiian and Other Pacific Islander	0%
Some other race	1.2%
Two or more races	10.4%
Hispanic or Latino (of any race)	3.3%

=== 2000 census ===
As of the census of 2000, there were 3,282 people, 1,322 households, and 913 families residing in the city. The population density was 1,264.1 inhabitants per square mile (488.1/km^{2}). There were 1,483 housing units at an average density of 571.2 per square mile (220.5/km^{2}). The racial makeup of the city was 85.19% White, 0.21% African American, 8.96% Native American, 0.46% Asian, 0.06% Pacific Islander, 0.34% from other races, and 4.78% from two or more races. Hispanic or Latino of any race were 1.04% of the population.

There were 1,322 households, out of which 30.9% had children under the age of 18 living with them, 54.2% were married couples living together, 10.2% had a female householder with no husband present, and 30.9% were non-families. 28.7% of all households were made up of individuals, and 16.6% had someone living alone who was 65 years of age or older. The average household size was 2.43 and the average family size was 2.97.

In the city, the population was spread out, with 25.9% under the age of 18, 8.8% from 18 to 24, 25.1% from 25 to 44, 20.5% from 45 to 64, and 19.7% who were 65 years of age or older. The median age was 38 years. For every 100 females, there were 87.7 males. For every 100 females age 18 and over, there were 83.8 males.

The median income for a household in the city was $28,861, and the median income for a family was $36,585. Males had a median income of $30,099 versus $19,122 for females. The per capita income for the city was $14,996. About 10.3% of families and 14.1% of the population were below the poverty line, including 17.3% of those under age 18 and 12.2% of those age 65 or over.

== Historic Site ==
The Mullendore Mansion, a two-and-one-half story Greek Revival structure built in 1910, is located at 910 N. Phillips St.

== Parks and Recreation ==
Cleveland is adjacent to Keystone Lake.

Cleveland City Lake is 7 miles W of town on US-64.

Cleveland City Parks and Recreation Department maintains three parks, with more than 50 picnic areas, 3 tennis courts, and 1 gymnasium.

== Education ==
It is in the Cleveland Public Schools school district.

== Notable people ==
- Robbie Nichols - Linebacker for the Baltimore Colts
- David Bivin - author
- Tony Perkins - president of the Family Research Council and a former Republican member of the Louisiana House of Representatives graduated from Cleveland High School in 1981.
- Billy Vessels was born in Cleveland in 1931 and played football for the Tigers before graduating and becoming a star back at the University of Oklahoma. He was the 1952 Heisman Trophy winner.
