= Mullendore Mansion =

Historic house in Oklahoma, United States

- U.S. National Register of Historic Places
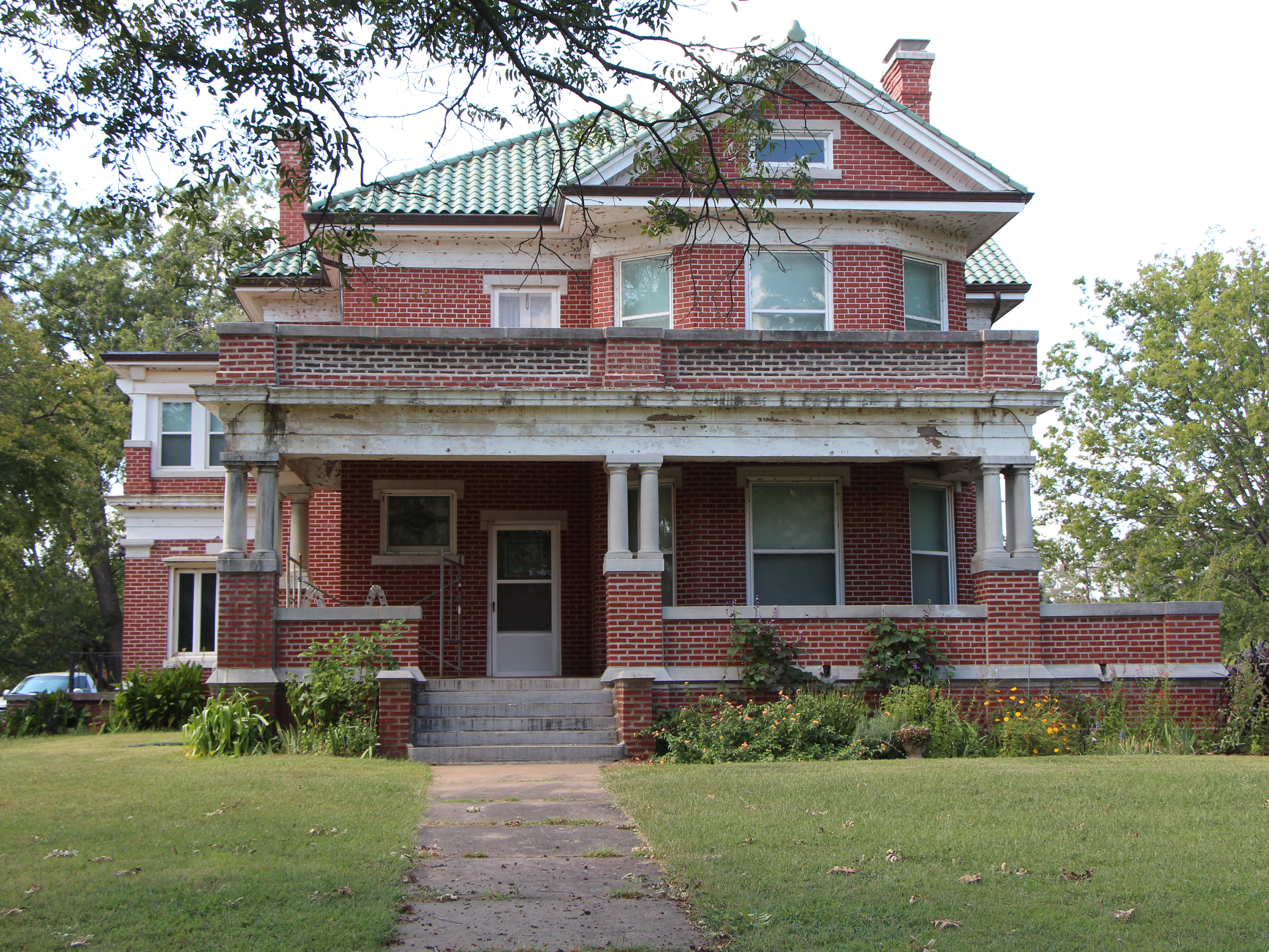
- Mullendore Mansion

- Location within Oklahoma Location within the United States
- Location: 910 N. Phillips St., Cleveland, Oklahoma
- Coordinates: 36°19′6″N 96°27′39″W
- Area: less than one acre
- Built: 1910
- NRHP reference No.: 84003402
- Added to NRHP: June 22, 1984

The Mullendore Mansion is a two-and-one-half-story Greek Revival structure in Cleveland, Oklahoma. Listed on the National Register of Historic Places listings in Pawnee County, Oklahoma in 1984, it was built in 1910 on 16 acres (6.5 hectares) overlooking the Arkansas River by E. C. Mullendore, an influential Oklahoma rancher and banker, who used it as his home until his death in 1938.

== See also ==
- E.C. Mullendore III
