= Pawnee Armory =

- U.S. National Register of Historic Places
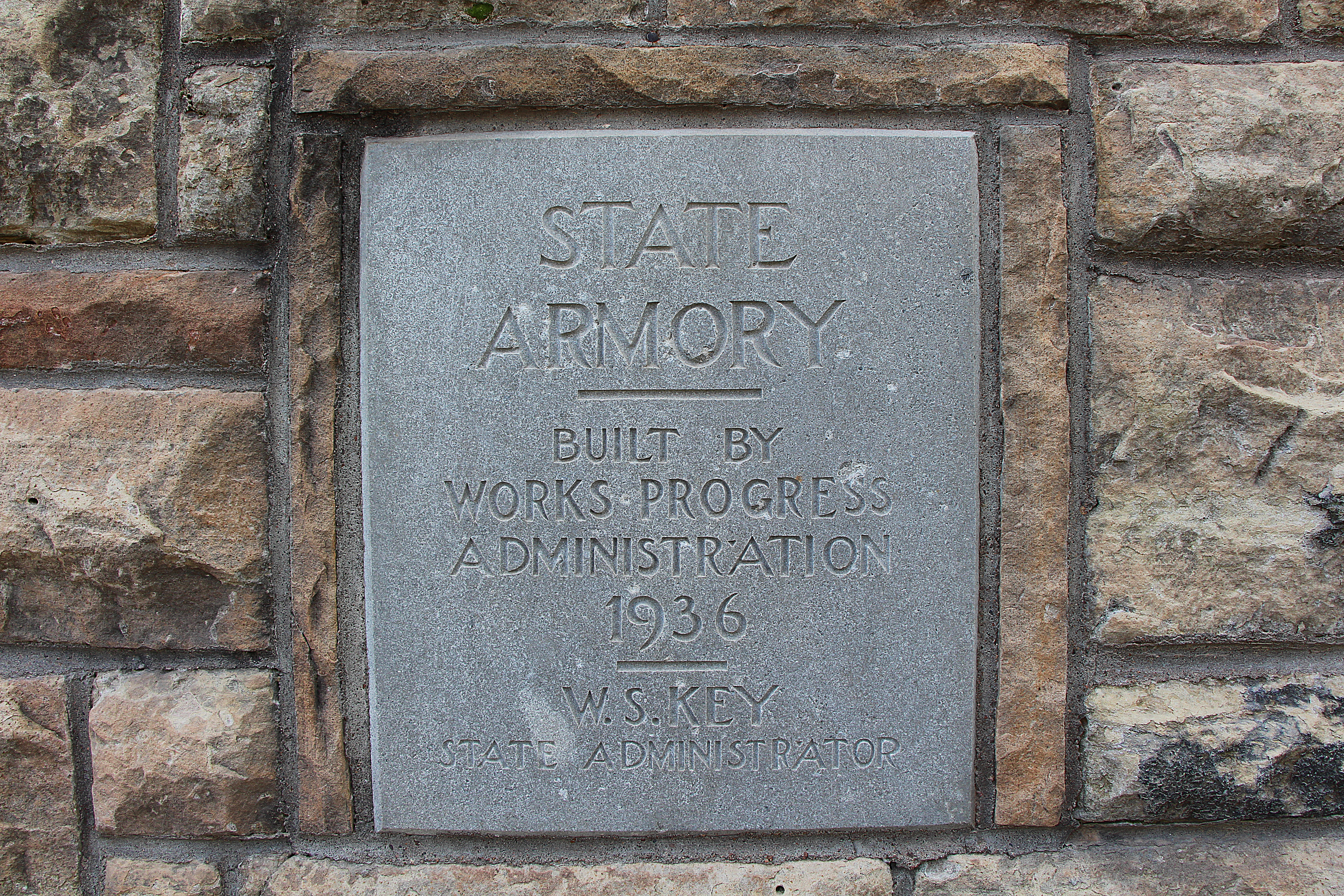
- Pawnee Armory plaque

- Location within Oklahoma Location within the United States
- Location: First and Cleveland Streets, Pawnee, Oklahoma
- Coordinates: 36°19′57″N 96°47′42″W
- Built: 1936
- Built by: WPA
- Architect: Bryan W. Nolen
- NRHP reference No.: 94000486
- Added to NRHP: May 20, 1994

The Pawnee Armory in Pawnee County, Oklahoma, United States, is a single story rectangular building measuring 149 ft (45 m) x 237 ft (72 m). It was built of native stone by the Works Progress Administration. According to the plaque on the building it was completed in 1936, though the application form for the National Historic Places Registration form indicates it was finished in 1937. It originally housed the Oklahoma National Guard. It was added to the National Register of Historic Places in 1994.

== Gallery ==
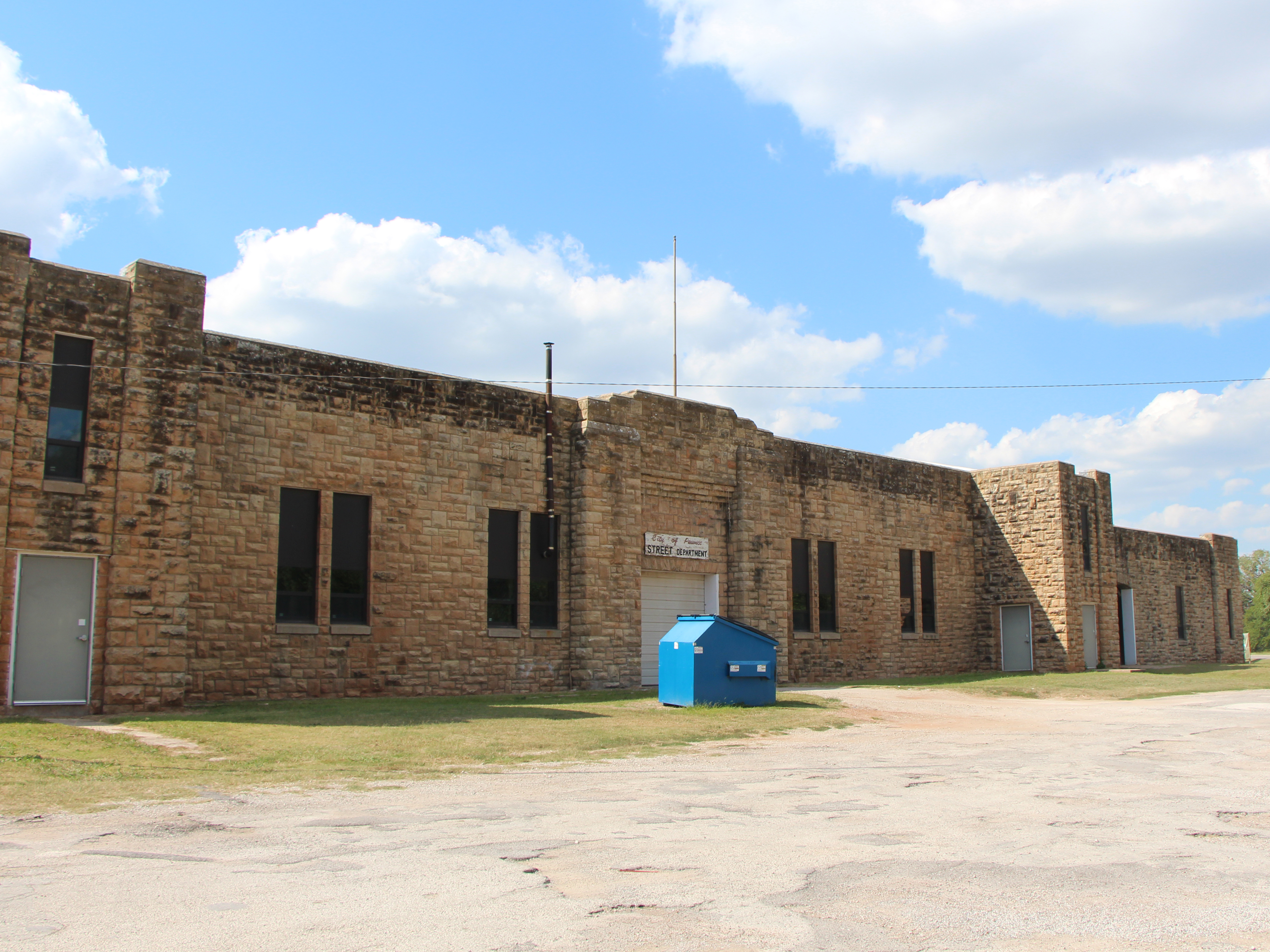
East side

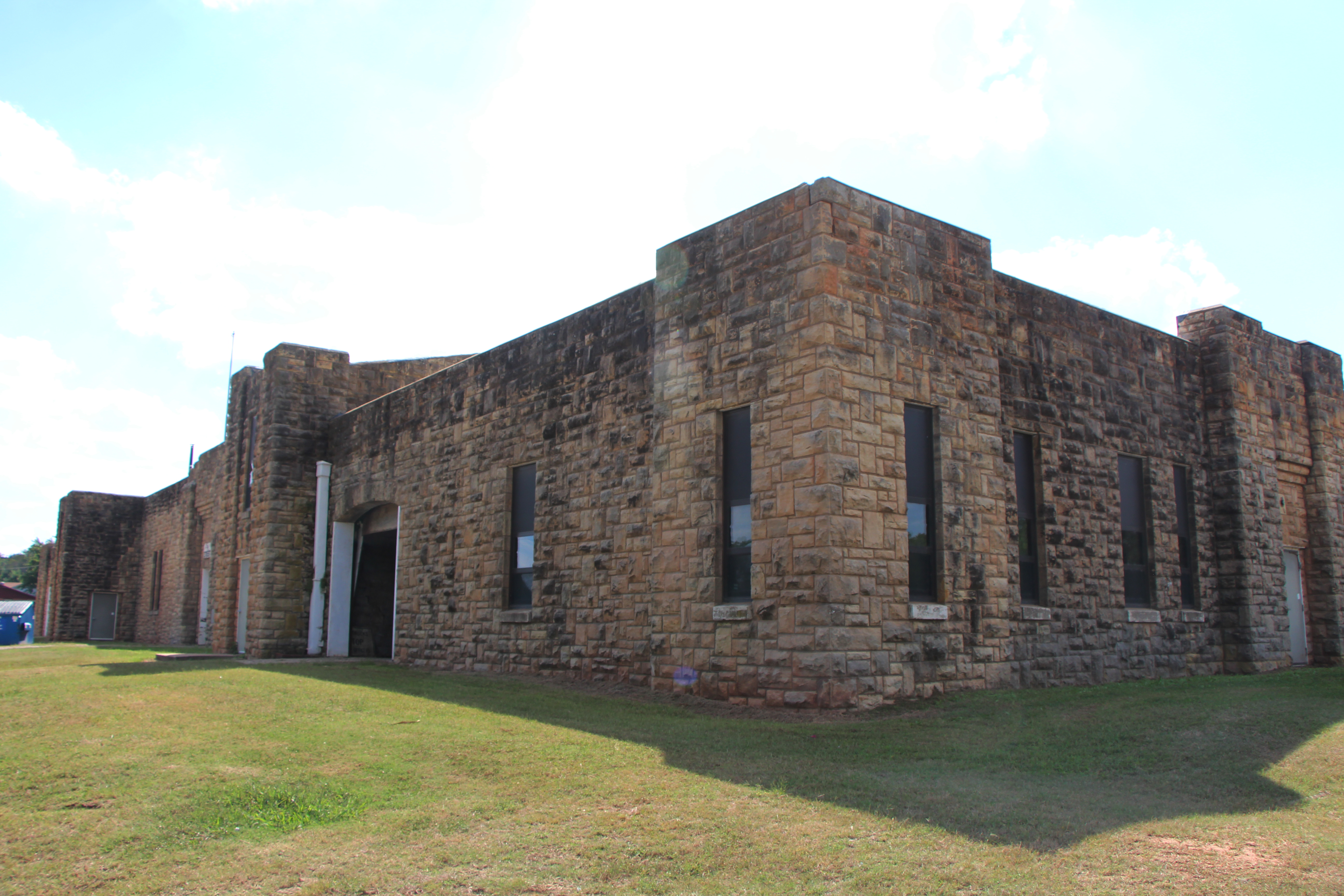
Northeast side

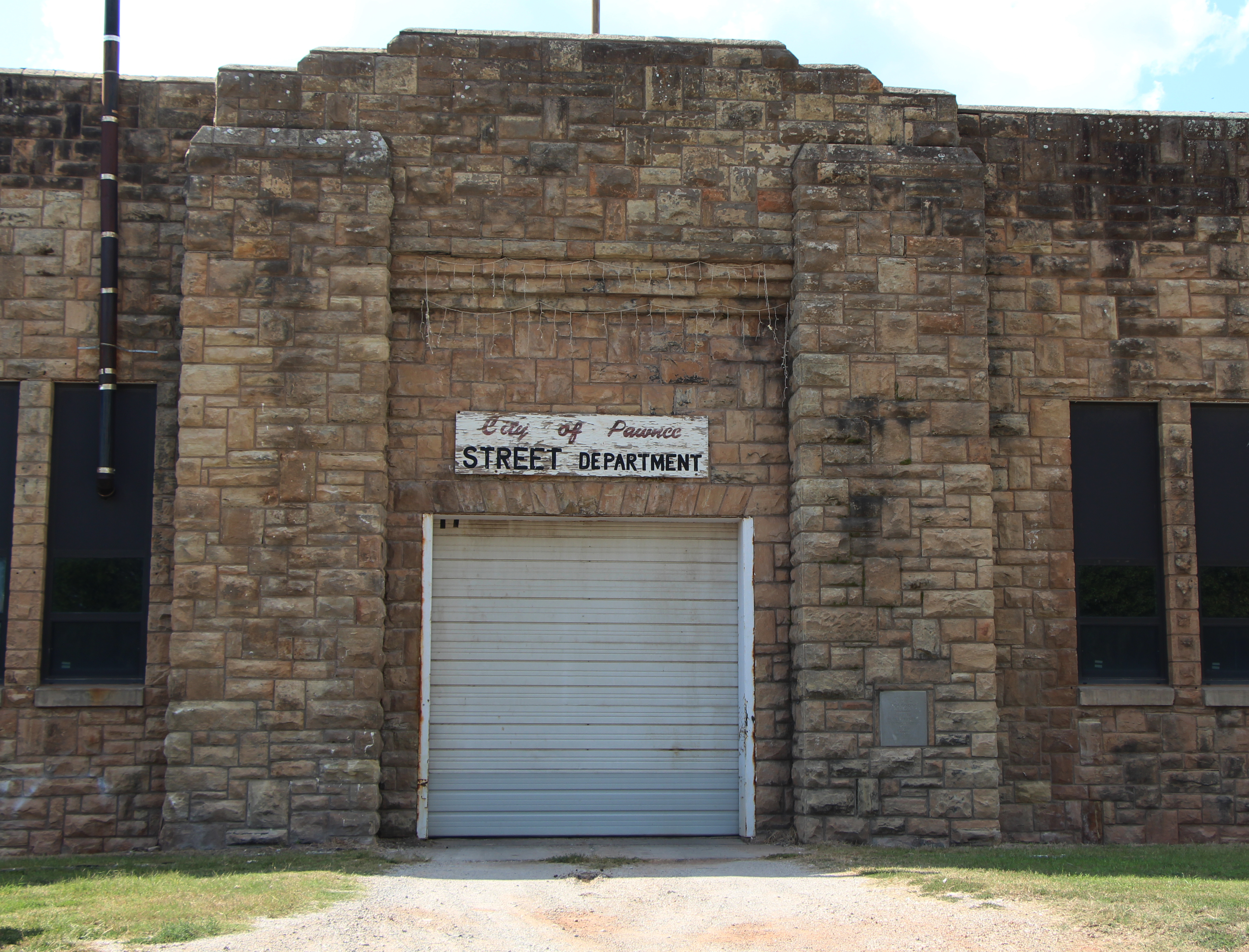
East side

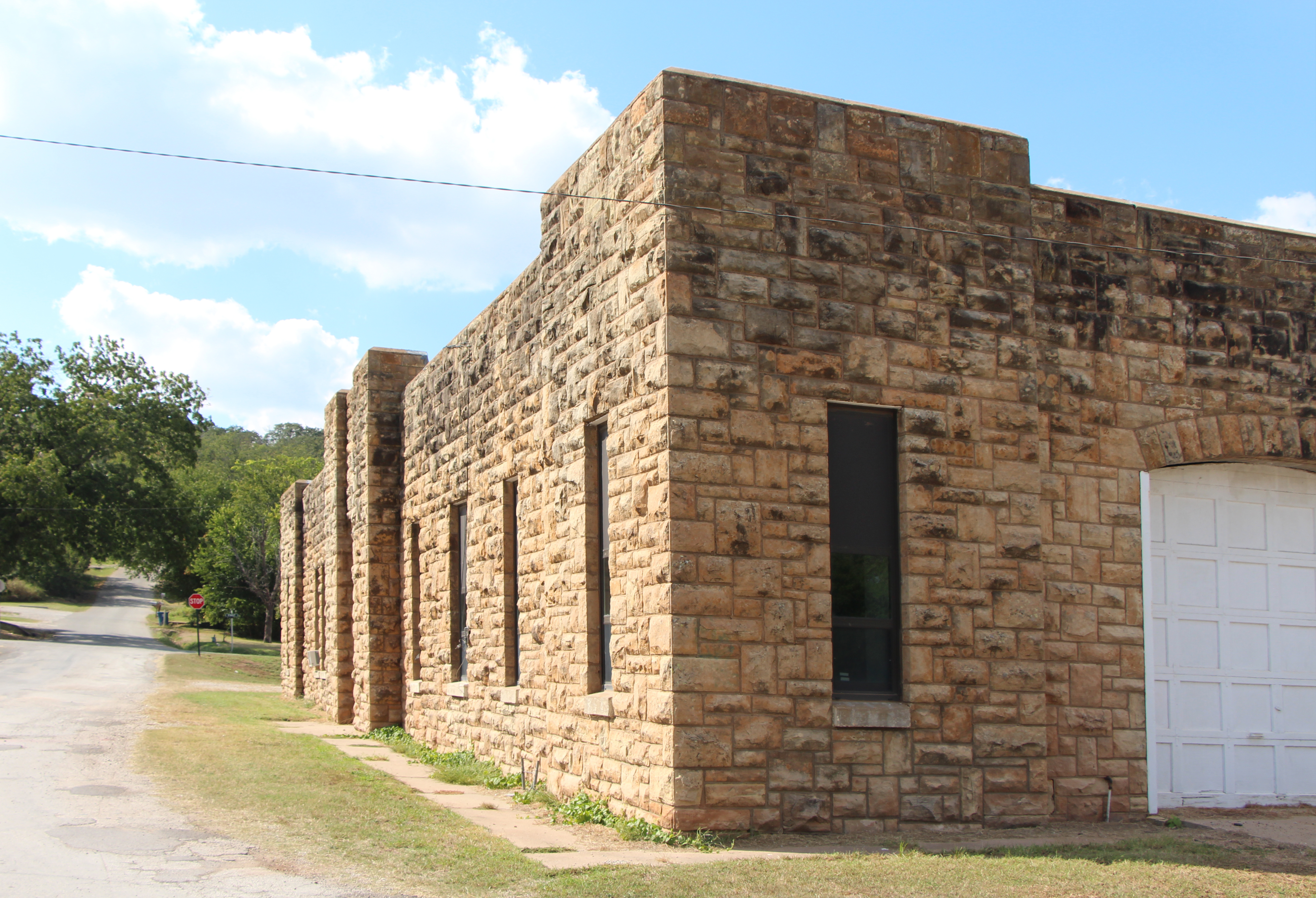
Southeast side
