= Ralston, Oklahoma =

- Town
- Location of Ralston, Oklahoma
- Coordinates: 36°30′12″N 96°44′14″W
- Country: United States
- State: Oklahoma
- County: Pawnee

Area
  - Total: 0.46 sq mi (1.20 km^{2})
  - Land: 0.46 sq mi (1.20 km^{2})
  - Water: 0 sq mi (0.00 km^{2})
- Elevation: 820 ft (250 m)

Population (2020)
  - Total: 266
  - Density: 576.5/sq mi (222.57/km^{2})
- Time zone: UTC-6 (Central (CST))
  - Summer (DST): UTC-5 (CDT)
- ZIP code: 74650
- Area codes: 539/918
- FIPS code: 40-61650
- GNIS feature ID: 2412522

Ralston (Pawnee: Iriíraatuhukaataku, reetuhruukaataku) is a town in Pawnee County, Oklahoma, United States. The town is southeast of Ponca City on State Highway 18 near the west bank of the Arkansas River. The population was 266 as of the 2020 Census.

== History ==
The townsite, occupied shortly after the opening of the Cherokee Strip, was originally called Riverside since it was located on the west bank of the Arkansas River, and it obtained a post office under that name on June 15, 1894. A townsite plat was filed on July 31, 1894, and the town was renamed Ralston for townsite developer J.H. Ralston. Early development was boosted by the arrival of the Eastern Oklahoma Railway (a Santa Fe Railway affiliate) in 1902, as well as a connecting line being completed into town in 1927. The town was also aided by a favorable location near the (dry) Osage Reservation which allowed it to serve as a liquor distribution point, with seven saloons operating on Main Avenue by 1903. Various agricultural enterprises grew up, and the town expanded through the 1930 census, reaching a population high of 725 persons at that time.

Besides hosting banks, churches, and other facilities, the town had its own newspaper, the Ralston Free Press, which was published every Friday. The paper first began publishing June 28, 1900, and continued until at least 1909.

== Geography ==
According to the United States Census Bureau, the town covers 0.5 square miles (1.3 km^{2}), all land.

=== Climate ===
According to the Köppen Climate Classification system, Ralston has a humid subtropical climate, abbreviated "Cfa" on climate maps. The hottest temperature recorded in Ralston was 115 °F (46.1 °C) in July 2012, while the coldest temperature recorded was −29 °F (−33.9 °C) in February 2011.

Climate data for Ralston, Oklahoma, 1991–2020 normals, extremes 1959–present
Month	Jan	Feb	Mar	Apr	May	Jun	Jul	Aug	Sep	Oct	Nov	Dec	Year
Record high °F (°C)	81 (27)	92 (33)	93 (34)	100 (38)	100 (38)	110 (43)	115 (46)	114 (46)	111 (44)	98 (37)	90 (32)	84 (29)	115 (46)
Mean maximum °F (°C)	71.7 (22.1)	76.7 (24.8)	83.9 (28.8)	88.0 (31.1)	91.5 (33.1)	96.8 (36.0)	102.1 (38.9)	102.2 (39.0)	97.7 (36.5)	89.1 (31.7)	79.5 (26.4)	71.2 (21.8)	104.1 (40.1)
Mean daily maximum °F (°C)	49.1 (9.5)	54.5 (12.5)	64.0 (17.8)	73.0 (22.8)	80.0 (26.7)	88.6 (31.4)	94.1 (34.5)	93.3 (34.1)	85.8 (29.9)	75.0 (23.9)	62.3 (16.8)	50.9 (10.5)	72.6 (22.5)
Daily mean °F (°C)	36.6 (2.6)	41.4 (5.2)	50.7 (10.4)	60.0 (15.6)	68.8 (20.4)	77.7 (25.4)	82.5 (28.1)	81.0 (27.2)	73.0 (22.8)	61.4 (16.3)	48.9 (9.4)	39.0 (3.9)	60.1 (15.6)
Mean daily minimum °F (°C)	24.0 (−4.4)	28.3 (−2.1)	37.4 (3.0)	47.0 (8.3)	57.6 (14.2)	66.8 (19.3)	70.8 (21.6)	68.6 (20.3)	60.2 (15.7)	47.9 (8.8)	35.6 (2.0)	27.0 (−2.8)	47.6 (8.7)
Mean minimum °F (°C)	6.0 (−14.4)	9.2 (−12.7)	16.5 (−8.6)	27.6 (−2.4)	38.8 (3.8)	52.7 (11.5)	59.3 (15.2)	56.0 (13.3)	42.1 (5.6)	28.6 (−1.9)	17.0 (−8.3)	8.6 (−13.0)	0.5 (−17.5)
Record low °F (°C)	−12 (−24)	−29 (−34)	−1 (−18)	18 (−8)	29 (−2)	44 (7)	49 (9)	43 (6)	30 (−1)	13 (−11)	6 (−14)	−13 (−25)	−29 (−34)
Average precipitation inches (mm)	1.22 (31)	1.57 (40)	2.76 (70)	4.06 (103)	5.36 (136)	4.50 (114)	3.75 (95)	3.95 (100)	3.39 (86)	3.08 (78)	1.94 (49)	1.86 (47)	37.44 (949)
Average snowfall inches (cm)	1.4 (3.6)	1.7 (4.3)	1.6 (4.1)	0.0 (0.0)	0.0 (0.0)	0.0 (0.0)	0.0 (0.0)	0.0 (0.0)	0.0 (0.0)	0.0 (0.0)	0.0 (0.0)	2.4 (6.1)	7.1 (18.1)
Average precipitation days (≥ 0.01 in)	3.1	3.5	5.3	6.2	8.4	6.4	5.1	5.4	5.6	5.2	3.9	3.8	61.9
Average snowy days (≥ 0.1 in)	1.2	0.8	0.8	0.0	0.0	0.0	0.0	0.0	0.0	0.0	0.1	1.1	4.0
Source 1: NOAA
Source 2: National Weather Service

== Demographics ==
Historical population
Census	Pop.	Note	%±
1910	597		—
1920	703		17.8%
1930	725		3.1%
1940	621		−14.3%
1950	416		−33.0%
1960	411		−1.2%
1970	443		7.8%
1980	495		11.7%
1990	405		−18.2%
2000	355		−12.3%
2010	330		−7.0%
2020	266		−19.4%
U.S. Decennial Census

=== 2020 census ===
As of the 2020 census, Ralston had a population of 266. The median age was 40.4 years. 30.5% of residents were under the age of 18 and 19.2% of residents were 65 years of age or older. For every 100 females there were 101.5 males, and for every 100 females age 18 and over there were 98.9 males age 18 and over.

0.0% of residents lived in urban areas, while 100.0% lived in rural areas.

There were 102 households in Ralston, of which 33.3% had children under the age of 18 living in them. Of all households, 50.0% were married-couple households, 16.7% were households with a male householder and no spouse or partner present, and 22.5% were households with a female householder and no spouse or partner present. About 25.5% of all households were made up of individuals and 9.8% had someone living alone who was 65 years of age or older.

There were 125 housing units, of which 18.4% were vacant. The homeowner vacancy rate was 0.0% and the rental vacancy rate was 18.8%.

Racial composition as of the 2020 census
Race	Number	Percent
White	195	73.3%
Black or African American	0	0.0%
American Indian and Alaska Native	37	13.9%
Asian	0	0.0%
Native Hawaiian and Other Pacific Islander	0	0.0%
Some other race	0	0.0%
Two or more races	34	12.8%
Hispanic or Latino (of any race)	7	2.6%

== Education ==
Residents are zoned to Woodland Public Schools, since 1990, due to the merger of the Ralston school district with the Fairfax district.

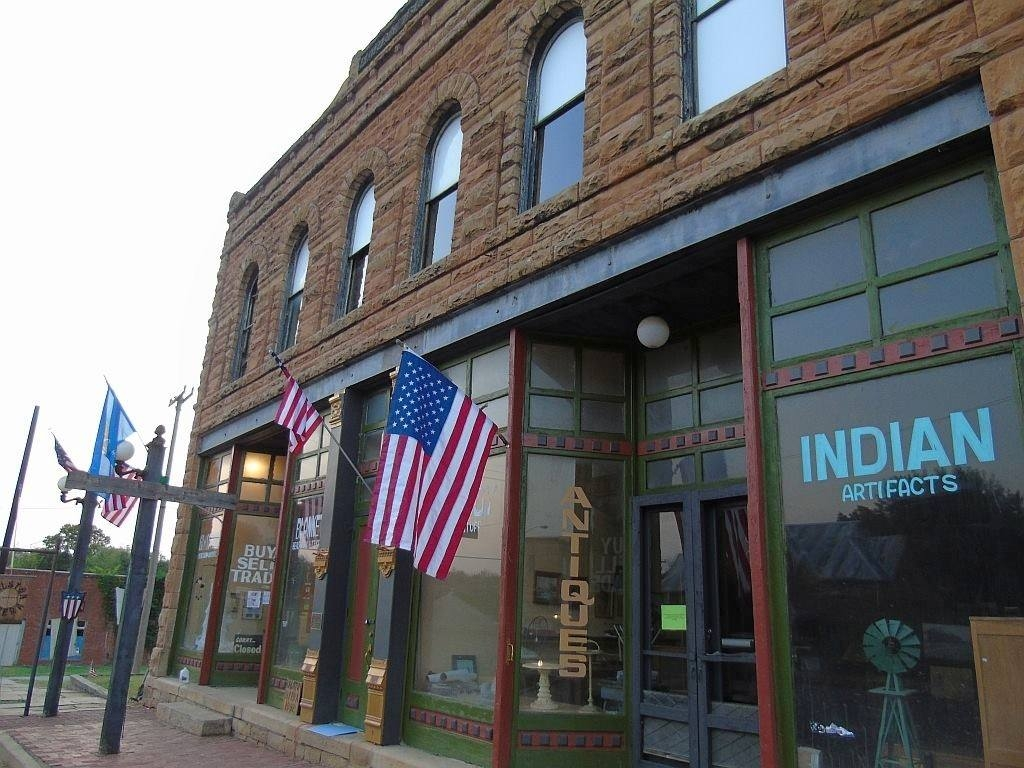
Ralston Opera House, located on the second floor, in September of 2018

== Historic Site ==
The Ralston Opera House is located at 501-503 Main Street. Built in 1902, the 2nd-floor Opera House is considered endangered and badly in need of restoration funding as of 2018.
