= Pawnee Indian Agency =

- U.S. National Register of Historic Places
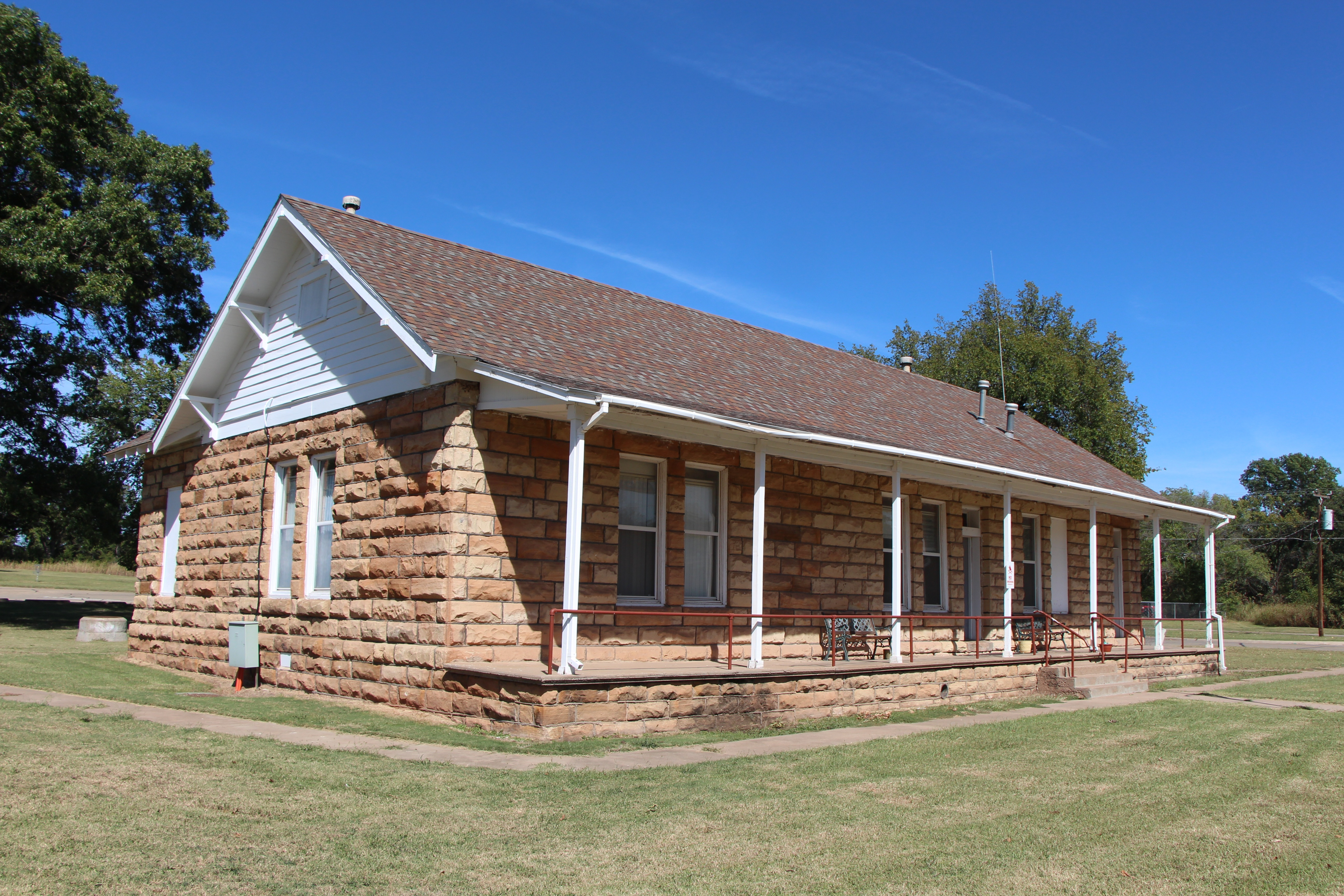
- Original Pawnee Indian Agency Building

- Location within Oklahoma Location within the United States
- Location: Pawnee, Oklahoma
- Coordinates: 36°20′16″N 96°47′23″W
- Area: 9.9 acres (4.0 ha)
- Built: 1906
- NRHP reference No.: 73001567
- Added to NRHP: April 11, 1973

The Pawnee Agency Office and Superintendent's House are two of several buildings located in the 29-acre Boarding School Historic District in Pawnee, Oklahoma. Both were awarded National Historic Place status in 1973. The surrounding district was awarded National Historic Place status in 2000.

The Superintendent's house is the oldest structure in the Historic District, built in 1876. It was the original office and residence of the Indian Agent. At the turn of the century this individual became the superintendent of the school in the Historic District.

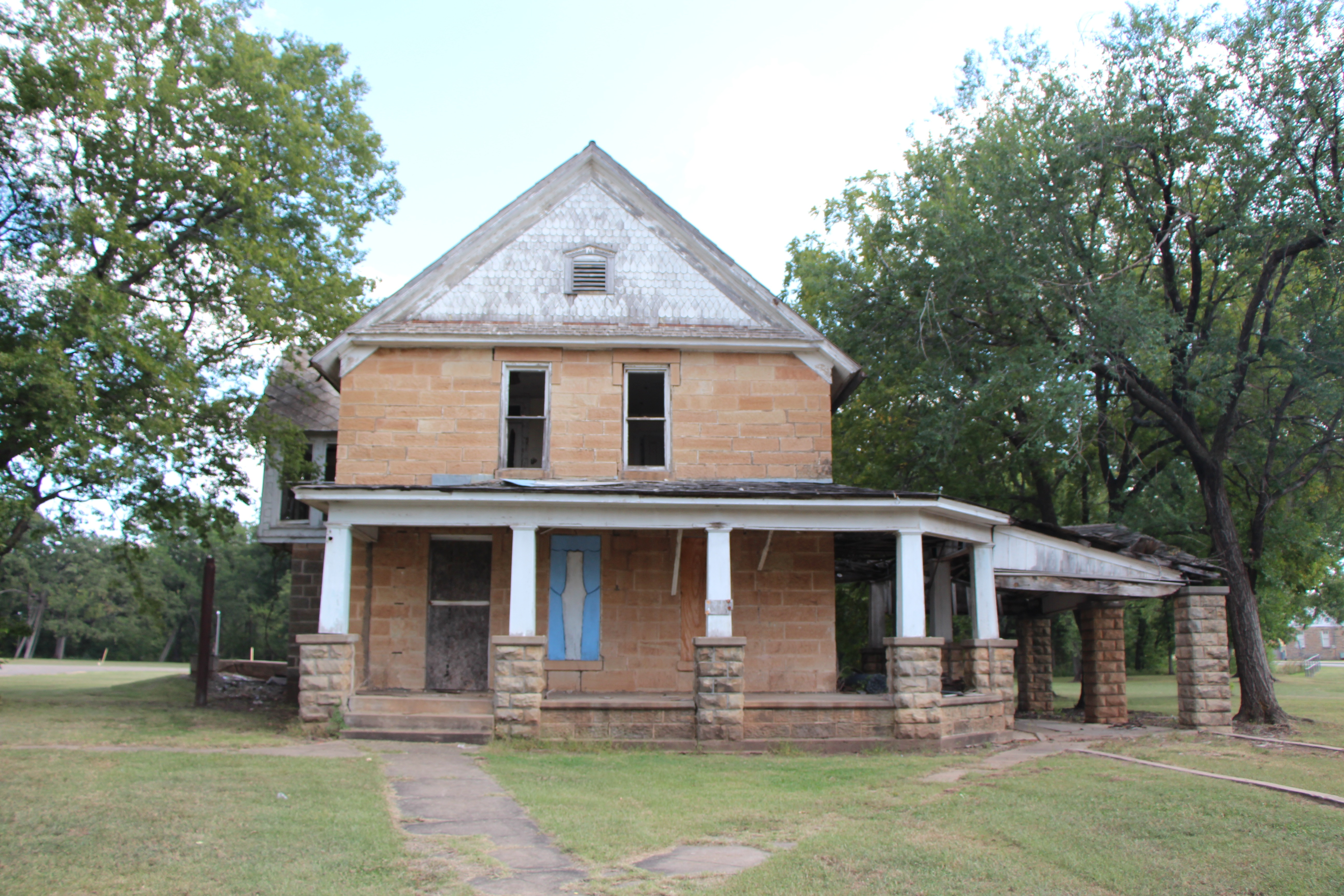
Superintendent's House, north view with porte cochere on right
