= Cattle Annie =

American outlaw (1882–1978)

Anna Emmaline McDoulet Frost Roach, or Cattle Annie
- Born: November 29, 1882; Lawrence, Kansas, United States
- Died: November 7, 1978 (aged 95); Oklahoma City, Oklahoma, United States
- Resting place: Rose Hill Burial Park in Oklahoma City
- Occupation: Outlaw in former Oklahoma Territory with the Doolin Gang Factory garment worker and later bookkeeper in Oklahoma City
- Spouses: Earl Frost (married 1901–1909, divorced); Whitmore R. Roach (married c. 1910–1947, his death)
- Children: 3

Anna Emmaline McDoulet, known as Cattle Annie (November 29, 1882 – November 7, 1978), was a young American outlaw in the American Old West, most associated with Jennie Stevens, or Little Britches. Their exploits are known in part through the fictional film Cattle Annie and Little Britches (1981), directed by Lamont Johnson and starring Amanda Plummer in her film debut as Cattle Annie, with Diane Lane as Little Britches.

Cattle Annie and Little Britches were crack shots with both pistol and rifle, but today they are mostly unknown outside of the film. Yet they were once among the most recognized names among outlaws in the Oklahoma and Indian territories, where they carried out their short-lived criminal ventures.

== Embracing the criminal element ==
Anna was born in Lawrence in Douglas County in eastern Kansas, one of eight children of James C. and Rebekah McDoulet. When Anna was four years old, the family moved to Coyville in Wilson County, in southeastern Kansas. Anna worked as a hotel dishwasher and performed other odd jobs. When she was twelve, the family moved to the Osage reservation near Skiatook north of Tulsa in the northern Oklahoma Territory, where she turned outlaw. Annie and Little Britches followed tales of the Bill Doolin gang from reading dime novelists like Ned Buntline, who became famous for his mostly fictional account of Buffalo Bill Cody as a western frontier hero and showman.

For two years, Cattle Annie and Little Britches roamed the former Indian Territory, often working together and at other times alone. They stole horses, sold alcohol to the Osage and Pawnee Indians, and warned outlaw gangs whenever law-enforcement officers were nearby. They wore men's clothing and packed pistols on their hips. Their adventures netted headlines from Guthrie, the capital of the former Oklahoma Territory, to Coffeyville in southeastern Kansas, where the Dalton gang attempted to rob two banks simultaneously on October 5, 1892.

U.S. Marshal Steve Burke captured 13-year-old Cattle Annie climbing from a window in 1895. (Marshal Bill Tilghman had a more difficult task apprehending Little Britches, who engaged in a physical confrontation with the famous lawman before he took her into custody.) Annie was sentenced to one year in the Massachusetts Correctional Institution in Framingham. Because of health issues, she was soon paroled. She remained in Framingham for some time, having informed corrections officers that, if she returned to Oklahoma, she would likely have fallen back into her criminal ways. In 1898, she was working as a housekeeper for Mrs. Mary Daniels in Sherborn in Middlesex County south of Framingham. A few months later, she may have moved to New York City, where she may have died of tuberculosis.

== Another scenario ==
Another legitimate report claims that Annie left Framingham to return to Oklahoma where she wed Earl Frost of Perry on March 13, 1901. The couple had two sons, Robert C. Frost (1903–1993) of Oklahoma City and Carlos D. Frost, later of Malibu, California. The Frosts divorced in Noble County, Oklahoma in October 1909, probably because Annie had joined a Wild West show. The historical museum in Guthrie maintains that, soon after the divorce from Frost, Annie married Whitmore R. Roach (1879–1947), a Texas native, veteran of World War I, and painting contractor in Oklahoma City, where they lived after 1912. They had resided from 1910 to 1912 in Fort Worth, Texas. This "Emma McDoulet Roach" is interred at Rose Hill Burial Park in Oklahoma City. She died in 1978, just short of her 96th birthday. Her newspaper obituary makes no mention of her early days or even the first name "Anna" but instead refers to "Emma", the shortened form of "Emmaline". The obituary indicates that she had been a bookkeeper in her later working career. Her services were held in her home church, Olivet Baptist in Oklahoma City.

Meanwhile, Little Britches also served a short sentence at the reformatory in Framingham, but her whereabouts thereafter are unknown. Some reports indicate that Little Britches returned to Tulsa, where she was married, had a family, and led an exemplary life.

== In popular culture ==
=== Film ===
Johnson's film, Cattle Annie and Little Britches (1981), features Burt Lancaster as an historically inaccurate and much older Bill Doolin, Amanda Plummer as Cattle Annie, Rod Steiger as Marshal William Tilghman, Scott Glenn as Bill Dalton, and Buck Taylor, particularly known to audiences as the blacksmith-turned-deputy Newly O'Brien on CBS's Gunsmoke, as the outlaw Dynamite Dick, presumably Dan Clifton, called "Dynamite Dan."

=== Print ===
Novelist Robert Ward, a native of Baltimore, Maryland, penned Cattle Annie and Little Britches (1977), his personal interpretation of the romantic legends of the Doolin-Dalton gang.
