= Blackburn Methodist Church =

Historic church in Oklahoma, United States

- U.S. National Register of Historic Places
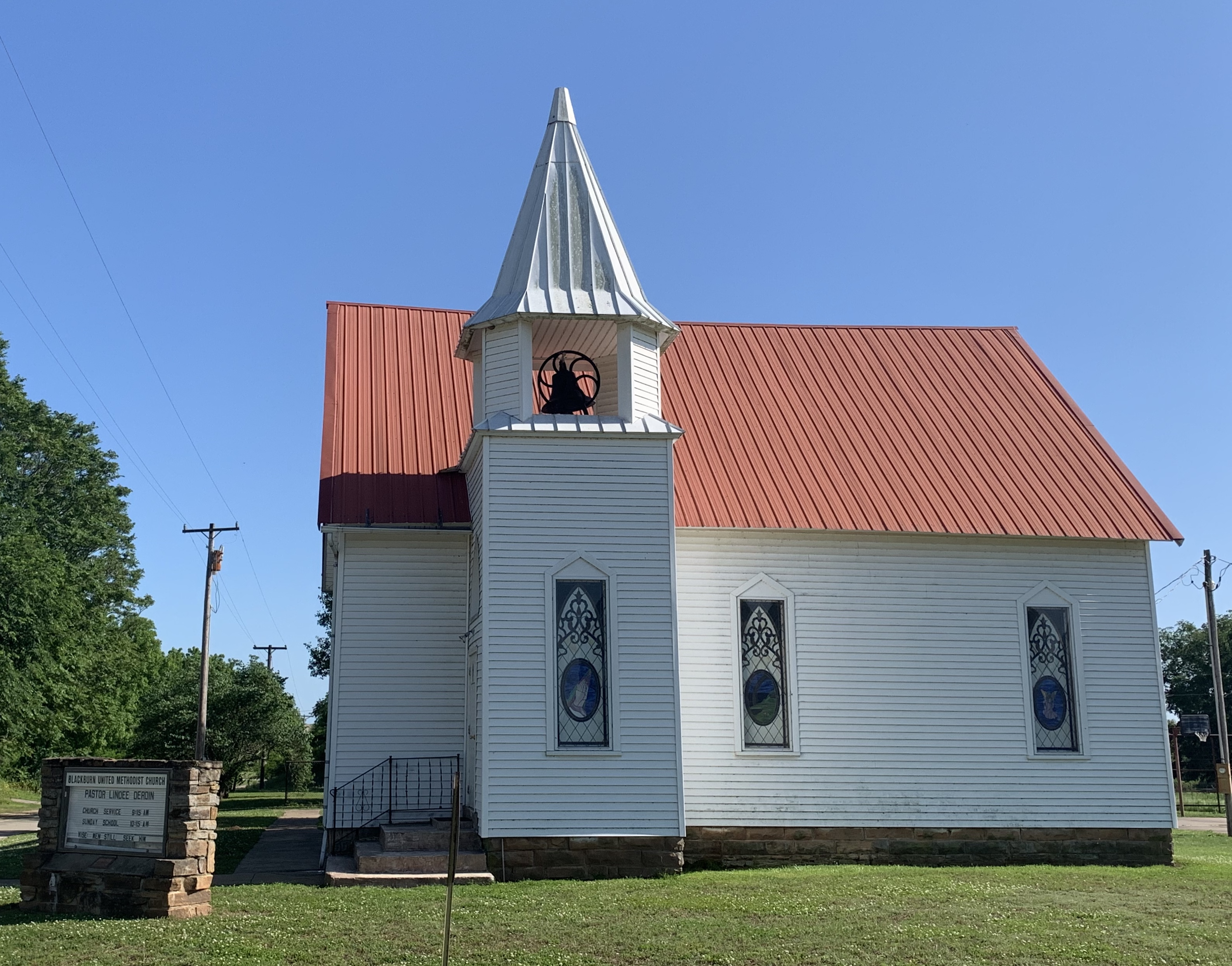

- Location within Oklahoma Location within the United States
- Location: D St. and 4th Ave. Blackburn, Oklahoma
- Coordinates: 36°22′19″N 96°35′40″W
- Area: less than one acre
- Built: 1904
- Architectural style: Carpenter Gothic
- MPS: Territorial Era Carpenter Gothic Churches TR
- NRHP reference No.: 84003398
- Added to NRHP: September 28, 1984

Blackburn Methodist Church, now known as the Blackburn Cornerstone Church, is an historic church at D Street and 4th Avenue in Blackburn, Oklahoma.

It was built in 1904 and is classified as being a Territorial-era Carpenter Gothic church of North Central Oklahoma.
