= Arkansas Valley National Bank =

- U.S. National Register of Historic Places
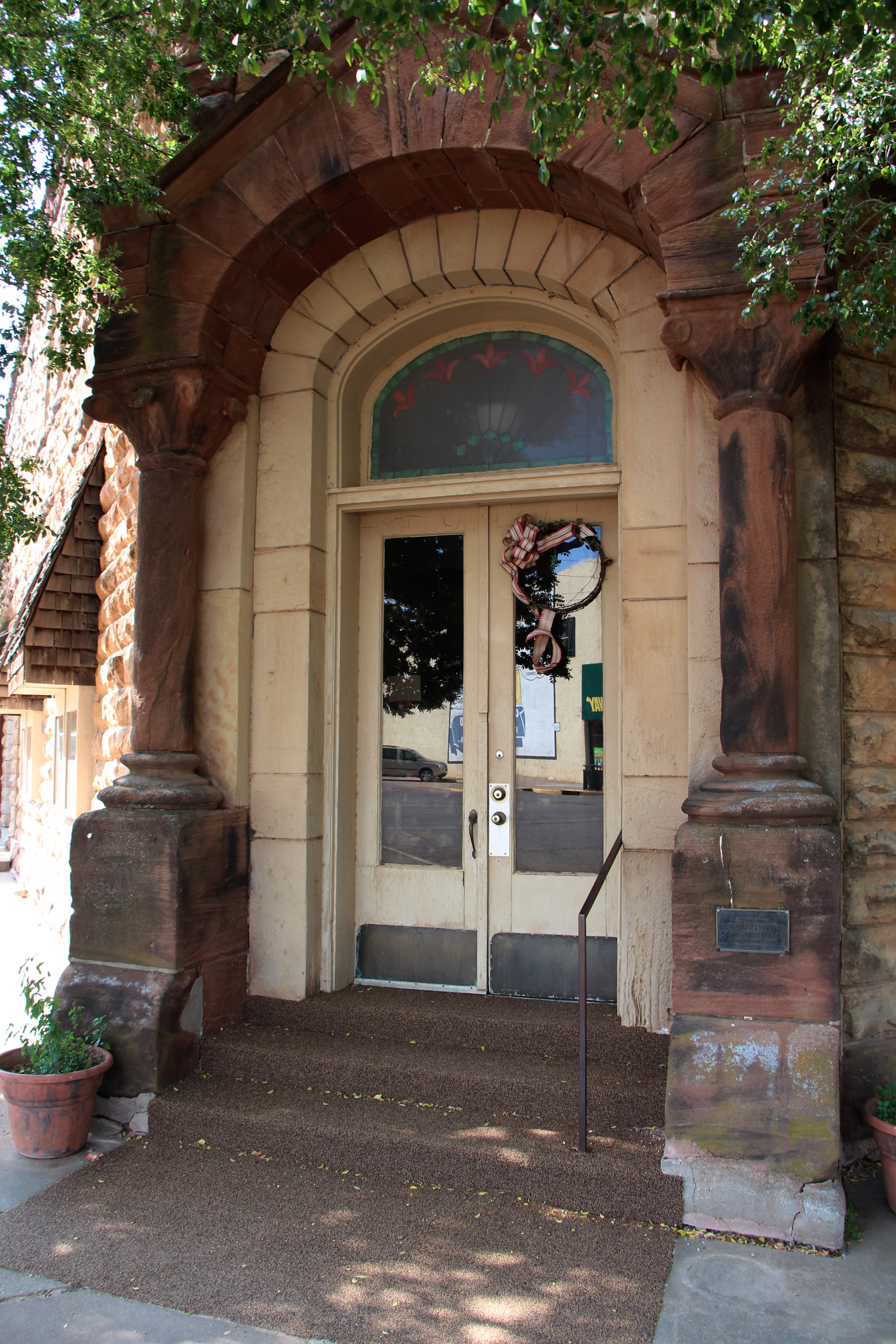
- Arkansas Valley National Bank (original chartered name)

- Location within Oklahoma Location within the United States
- Location: 547 6th St., Pawnee, Oklahoma
- Coordinates: 36°20′19″N 96°48′12″W
- Area: 1 acre (0.40 ha)
- Built: 1902
- Architectural style: Late Victorian
- NRHP reference No.: 78002256
- Added to NRHP: November 17, 1978

The Arkansas Valley National Bank, constructed in 1902, is a two-story, 30 feet x 90 feet sandstone structure located in Pawnee, Oklahoma. Constructed in a Late Victorian architectural style, it was Pawnee's original bank. When the building opened, the bank occupied the first floor, while a doctor, photographer, and local telephone office occupied the second floor. The bank closed around 1918, and the building has served as various storefronts since.

Originally the bank was to be called the Pawnee County Bank, and this name is engraved on the east wall; however it was chartered as the Arkansas Valley National Bank. It was listed on the National Register of Historic Places in 1978.

The building's facade was heavily damaged in a 5.8-magnitude earthquake on September 3, 2016.

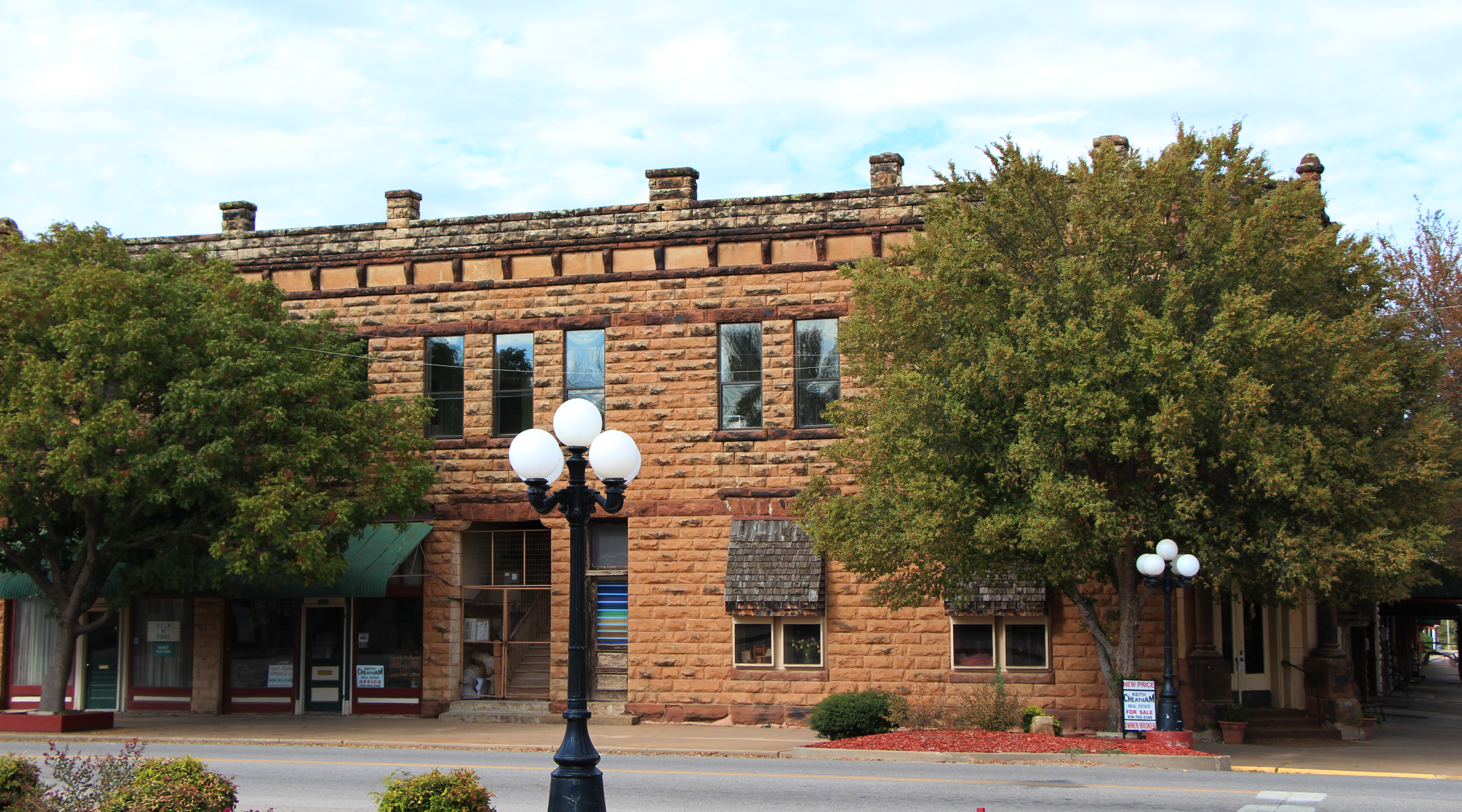
Arkansas National Bank, south side.
