= Corliss Steam Engine (Pawnee, Oklahoma) =

- U.S. National Register of Historic Places
- Location within Oklahoma Location within the United States
- Location: Pawnee County Fairgrounds, Pawnee, Oklahoma
- Coordinates: 36°20′48″N 96°47′39″W
- Built: 1912
- Architect: Corliss, G.H.
- Architectural style: Steam Engine
- NRHP reference No.: 79002016
- Added to NRHP: May 7, 1979

The Corliss Steam Engine on the Pawnee County Fairgrounds in Pawnee, Oklahoma is a Corliss steam engine that was built c. 1912. It and a twin sister engine were originally built for the Blackwell Zinc Co., of Blackwell, Oklahoma. It powered most of the electricity-powered machinery in the 1000-employee zinc smelting plant, until the plant closed in 1973.

It was later donated to the Oklahoma Steam Thresher Association, disassembled, and restored in its own building on the Pawnee County Fairgrounds. One source on the web has 6 photos of the engine displayed there.

== NRHP listing ==
It was listed on the National Register of Historic Places on May 7, 1979, with NRIS number 79002016. The application states that the significance of this engine is:"...(1) its position of pre-eminence in the history of American technology, (2) its role in the Industrial development of Oklahoma, and (3) its survival as one of the country's few remaining functional Corliss Engines."

== History of Corliss steam engines ==
A steam engine fitted with rotary valves and having variable valve timing was invented by and named for an American Engineer, George Henry Corliss, in 1849. Engines fitted with Corliss valve gear offered the best thermal efficiency of any type of stationary steam engine until the refinement of the uniflow steam engine and steam turbine in the 20th century. Corliss' engines were generally about 30 percent more fuel efficient than conventional steam engines with fixed cutoff. This increased efficiency made steam power more economical than water power, allowing industrial development away from millponds.

== Description of the Pawnee engine ==
The Corliss engine now displayed in Pawnee was part of an Allis-Chalmers steam electric generating plant. It is a large piece of machinery in every respect, being 25 feet (7.6 m) long by 18 feet (5.5 m) wide and weighing 110 tons. The flywheel is 12 feet (3.7 m) in diameter and weighs 10 tons. The cylinder has a 20 inches (51 cm) bore with a 36 inches (91 cm) stroke.

This engine uses separate valves for the steam and the exhaust to allow natural drainage. It also has a Reynolds trip gear, which uses a spring to cause the engagement of the hook with the catch plate. Sudden unequal pressure buildups were prevented by having a space between the outer surface of the boiler and the inner surface of the steam regulator.

At the time of the NRHP application, the system was assessed in good operating condition, and is regularly demonstrated at the annual Oklahoma Steam and Gas Engine Show on the first Friday, Saturday, and Sunday in May.
