= Pawnee County Courthouse (Oklahoma) =

- U.S. National Register of Historic Places
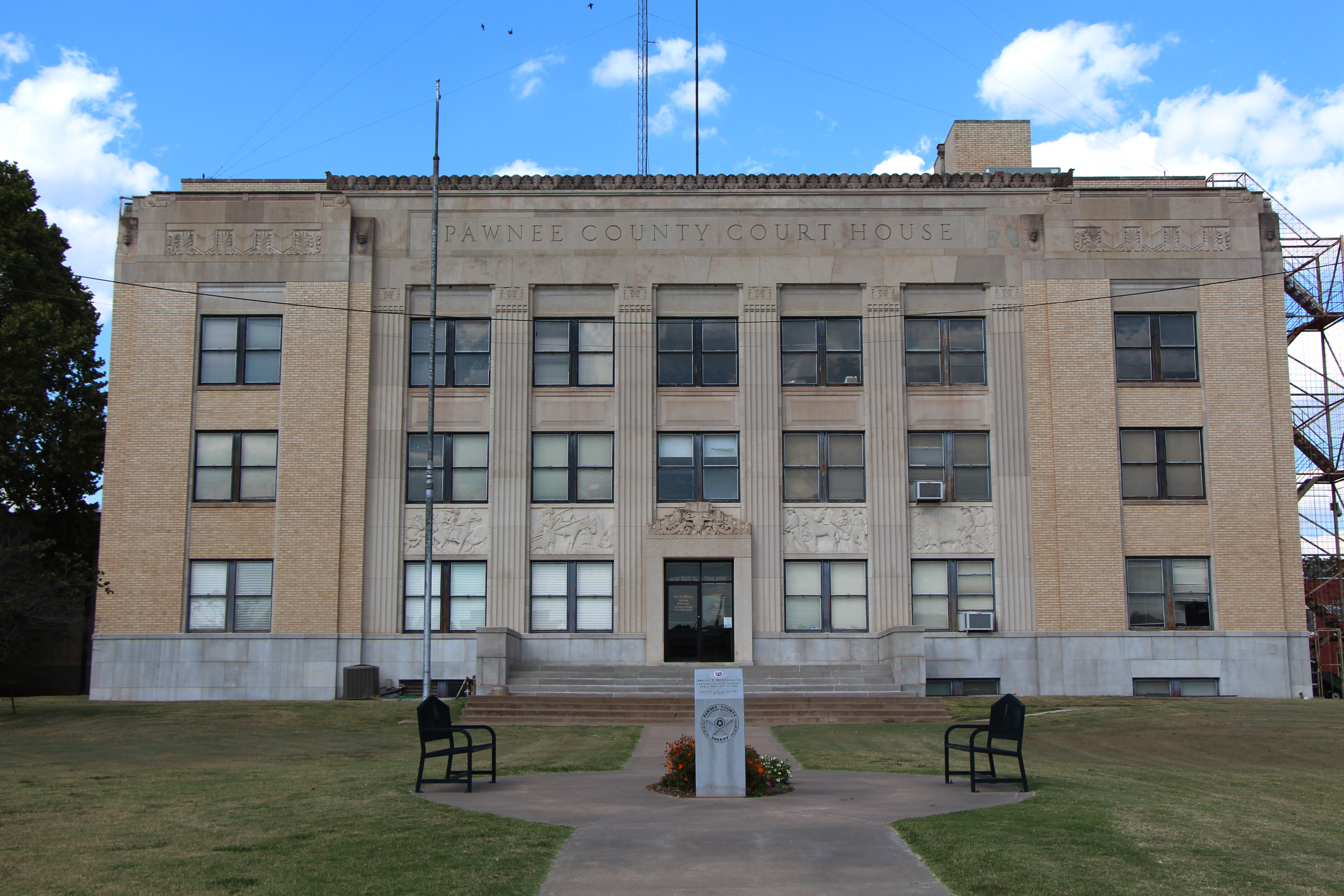
- Pawnee County Courthouse, north side

- Location within Oklahoma Location within the United States
- Location: 500 Harrison St., Pawnee, Oklahoma
- Coordinates: 36°20′19″N 96°48′9″W
- Built: 1932
- Built by: Manhattan Construction Co
- Architect: Smith & Senter
- NRHP reference No.: 84003406
- Added to NRHP: August 23, 1984

The Pawnee County Courthouse is a three-story art deco brick building that is still functioning as a courthouse. Four bas-relief panels on either side of the entrance on the south side depict scenes of Native Americans and pioneers, while the lintel depicts an eagle, a cow's skull, an owl, an open book and two rattlesnakes (numbers 3 and 4 below). The west end has a lintel like the one on the south side. The north side of the courthouse as another four panels, two of Native Americans and two of pioneers. Across the top of the building are heads of Native Americans.

It is one of two courthouses in Oklahoma that attempt to meld Native American and pioneer scenes (the other being the Adair County Courthouse (Oklahoma).

== Bas-Relief Detail ==
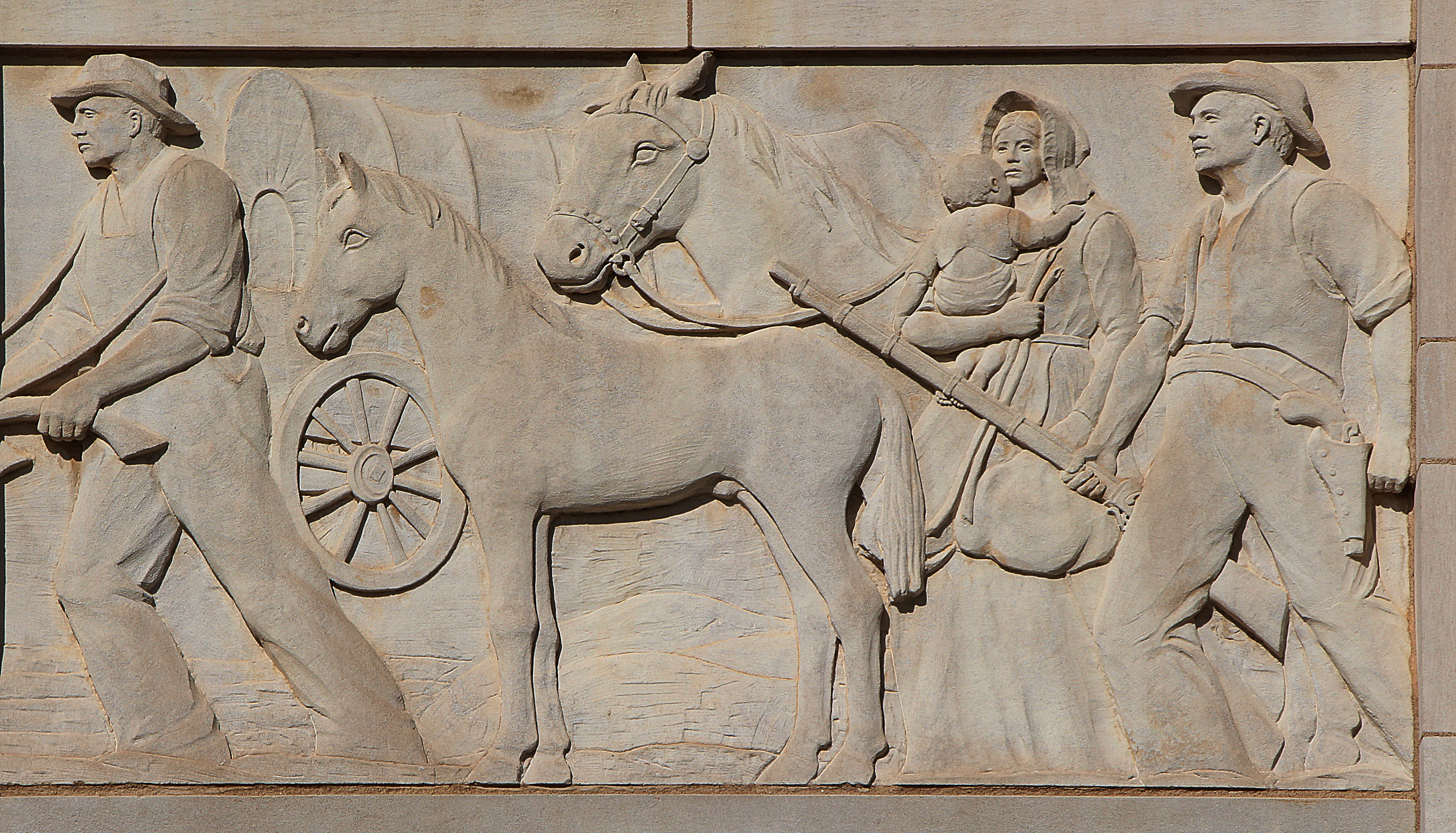
Bas-relief panel

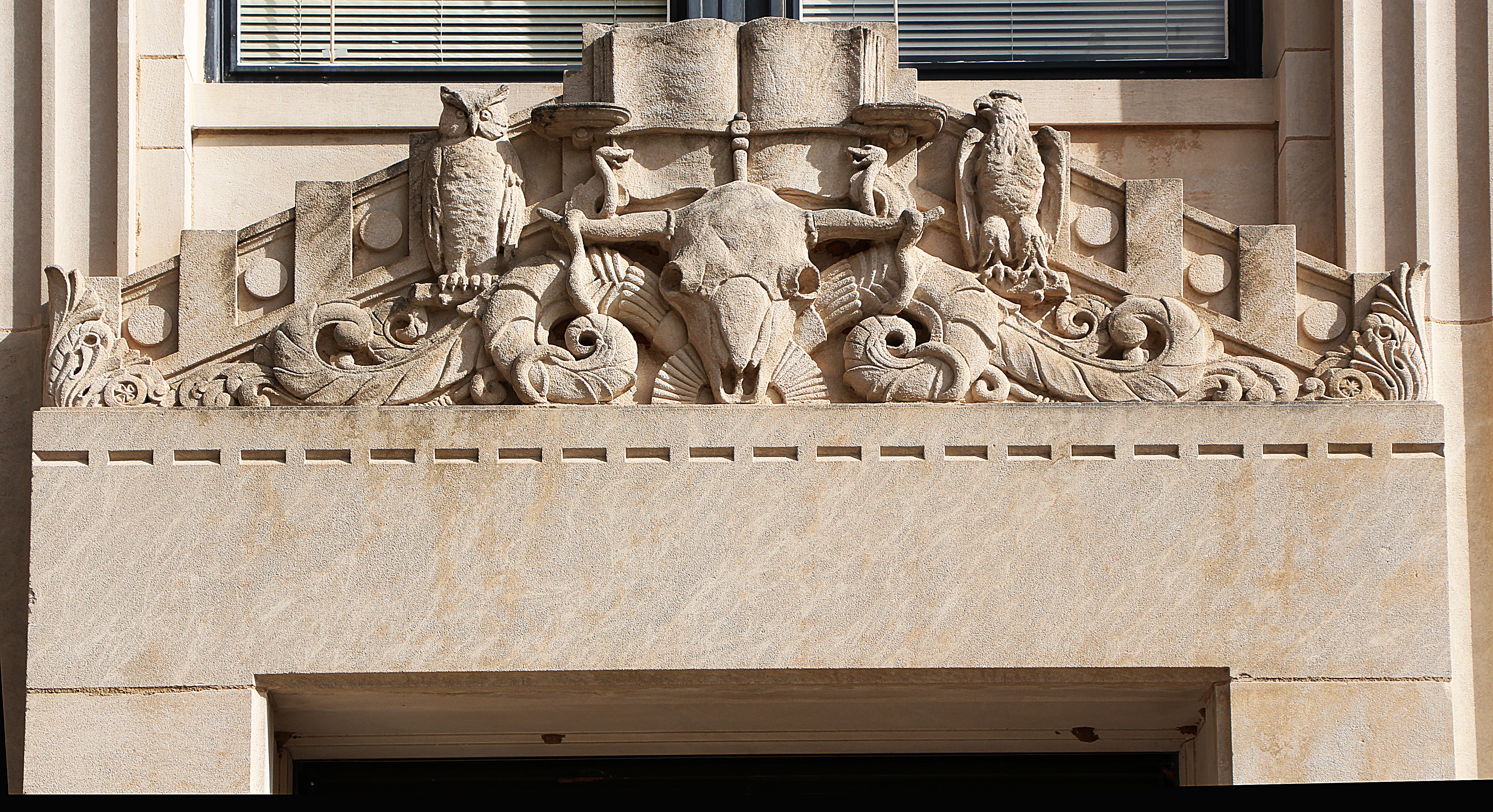
Lintel

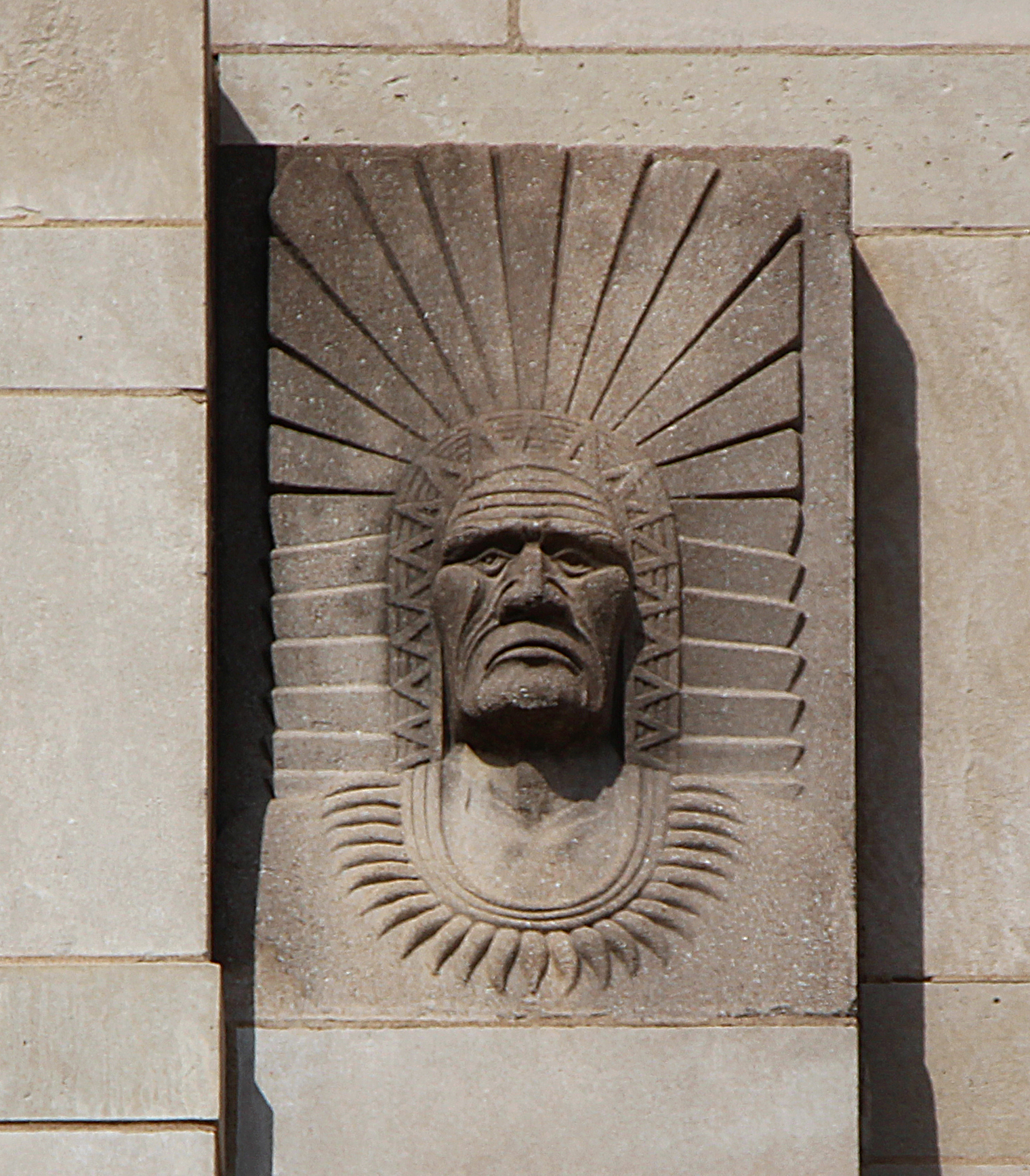
Bas relief
