= National Register of Historic Places listings in Harmon County, Oklahoma =

Location of Harmon County in Oklahoma

This is a list of the National Register of Historic Places listings in Harmon County, Oklahoma.

This is intended to be a complete list of the properties on the National Register of Historic Places in Harmon County, Oklahoma, United States. The locations of National Register properties for which the latitude and longitude coordinates are included below, may be seen in a map.

There are 4 properties listed on the National Register in the county.

This National Park Service list is complete through NPS recent listings posted March 14, 2025.

== Current listings ==
	Name on the Register	Image	Date listed	Location	City or town	Description
1	Gould Community Building	Gould Community Building	December 11, 2007 (#07001264)	Kennedy St. 34°40′12″N 99°46′22″W	Gould	
2	Harmon County Courthouse	Harmon County Courthouse	August 23, 1984 (#84003031)	W. Hollis St. 34°41′04″N 99°55′06″W	Hollis	
3	Hollis City Hall and Jail	Hollis City Hall and Jail	December 11, 2007 (#07001267)	101 W. Jones St. 34°40′51″N 99°55′02″W	Hollis	
4	United States Post Office Hollis	United States Post Office Hollis	April 17, 2009 (#09000215)	120 N. 2nd St. 34°40′57″N 99°55′11″W	Hollis	

== See also ==
- List of National Historic Landmarks in Oklahoma
- National Register of Historic Places listings in Oklahoma
