= 2000 United States presidential election in Oklahoma =

- November 7, 2000

Nominee	George W. Bush	Al Gore
Party	Republican	Democratic
Home state	Texas	Tennessee
Running mate	Dick Cheney	Joe Lieberman
Electoral vote	8	0
Popular vote	744,337	474,276
Percentage	60.31%	38.43%

Bush
40–50%
50–60%
60–70%
70–80%
80–90%
90–100%
Gore
40–50%
50–60%
60–70%
70–80%
80–90%
90–100%
Tie/No votes
Tie
No votes
President before election
Bill Clinton
Democratic
Elected President
George W. Bush
Republican

The 2000 United States presidential election in Oklahoma took place on November 7, 2000, and was part of the 2000 United States presidential election. Voters chose eight representatives, or electors to the Electoral College, who voted for president and vice president.

Oklahoma was won by the Republican Party candidate, Texas Governor George W. Bush with a 21.88% margin of victory. Oklahoma is one of the most reliably Republican states in the nation, having last voted for the Democratic nominee in 1964.

As of the 2024 presidential election, this is the last time that the Republican presidential nominee failed to win all 77 counties in Oklahoma. As a result, this is the last time the Democratic nominee won the following counties: Ottawa, Cherokee, Muskogee, Okmulgee, McIntosh, Hughes, Haskell, Latimer, and Choctaw. This was also the last time until 2016 that any third-party candidates were granted ballot access in Oklahoma and the last time until 2020 that any county was won by only a plurality.

== Primary elections ==
=== Democratic primary ===
2000 Oklahoma Democratic presidential primary
Candidate	Votes	%	Delegates
Al Gore	92,654	68.71	38
Bill Bradley	34,311	25.44	7
Lyndon LaRouche, Jr.	7,885	5.85	0
Total	134,850	100%	45

== General election ==
=== Polling ===
Poll source	Date(s)	Sample size	Margin of error	George W. Bush (R)	Al Gore (D)	Other / undecided (Note: Calculated by taking the difference of 100% and all other candidates combined.)
Harris Insights & Analytics	November 3, 2000	3,206	—	59%	37%	4%
Mason-Dixon Polling & Strategy	November 3, 2000	625	—	54%	39%	7%

=== Results ===
2000 United States presidential election in Oklahoma
Party	Candidate	Votes	Percentage	Electoral votes
Republican	George W. Bush	744,337	60.31%	8
Democratic	Al Gore	474,276	38.43%	0
Reform	Pat Buchanan	9,014	0.73%	0
Libertarian	Harry Browne	6,602	0.53%	0

==== By county ====
County	George W. Bush Republican		Al Gore Democratic		Various candidates Other parties		Margin		Total
County	#	%	#	%	#	%	#	%	Total
Adair	3,503	58.61%	2,361	39.50%	113	1.89%	1,142	19.11%	5,977
Alfalfa	1,886	75.23%	583	23.25%	38	1.52%	1,303	51.98%	2,507
Atoka	2,375	54.93%	1,906	44.08%	43	0.99%	469	10.85%	4,324
Beaver	2,092	85.18%	339	13.80%	25	1.02%	1,753	71.38%	2,456
Beckham	4,067	62.26%	2,408	36.86%	57	0.87%	1,659	25.40%	6,532
Blaine	2,633	64.31%	1,402	34.25%	59	1.44%	1,231	30.06%	4,094
Bryan	6,084	51.80%	5,554	47.28%	108	0.92%	530	4.52%	11,746
Caddo	4,835	52.50%	4,272	46.38%	103	1.12%	563	6.12%	9,210
Canadian	22,679	72.32%	8,367	26.68%	314	1.00%	14,312	45.64%	31,360
Carter	9,667	58.74%	6,659	40.46%	132	0.80%	3,008	18.28%	16,458
Cherokee	6,918	47.82%	7,256	50.15%	294	2.03%	-338	-2.33%	14,468
Choctaw	2,461	46.30%	2,799	52.66%	55	1.03%	-338	-6.36%	5,315
Cimarron	1,230	82.88%	227	15.30%	27	1.82%	1,003	67.58%	1,484
Cleveland	47,393	62.22%	27,792	36.49%	986	1.29%	19,601	25.73%	76,171
Coal	1,196	50.64%	1,148	48.60%	18	0.76%	48	2.04%	2,362
Comanche	17,103	58.31%	11,971	40.81%	259	0.88%	5,132	17.50%	29,333
Cotton	1,388	55.92%	1,068	43.03%	26	1.05%	320	12.89%	2,482
Craig	2,815	51.33%	2,568	46.83%	101	1.84%	247	4.50%	5,484
Creek	13,580	57.20%	9,753	41.08%	408	1.72%	3,827	16.12%	23,741
Custer	6,527	66.99%	3,115	31.97%	101	1.04%	3,412	35.02%	9,743
Delaware	7,618	57.05%	5,514	41.29%	221	1.66%	2,104	15.76%	13,353
Dewey	1,607	72.39%	599	26.98%	14	0.63%	1,008	45.41%	2,220
Ellis	1,513	75.16%	468	23.25%	32	1.59%	1,045	51.91%	2,013
Garfield	14,902	68.73%	6,543	30.18%	238	1.10%	8,359	38.55%	21,683
Garvin	5,536	56.24%	4,189	42.56%	118	1.20%	1,347	13.68%	9,843
Grady	10,040	61.69%	6,037	37.09%	199	1.22%	4,003	24.60%	16,276
Grant	1,762	70.40%	709	28.33%	32	1.28%	1,053	42.07%	2,503
Greer	1,287	59.80%	839	38.99%	26	1.21%	448	20.81%	2,152
Harmon	692	57.43%	507	42.07%	6	0.50%	185	15.36%	1,205
Harper	1,296	77.01%	374	22.22%	13	0.77%	922	54.79%	1,683
Haskell	2,039	44.06%	2,510	54.24%	79	1.71%	-471	-10.18%	4,628
Hughes	2,196	47.90%	2,334	50.91%	55	1.20%	-138	-3.01%	4,585
Jackson	5,591	68.53%	2,515	30.82%	53	0.65%	3,076	37.71%	8,159
Jefferson	1,320	50.91%	1,245	48.01%	28	1.08%	75	2.90%	2,593
Johnston	2,072	52.72%	1,809	46.03%	49	1.25%	263	6.69%	3,930
Kay	11,768	64.79%	6,122	33.71%	272	1.50%	5,646	31.08%	18,162
Kingfisher	4,693	77.49%	1,304	21.53%	59	0.97%	3,389	55.96%	6,056
Kiowa	2,173	57.95%	1,544	41.17%	33	0.88%	629	16.78%	3,750
Latimer	1,739	47.40%	1,865	50.83%	65	1.77%	-126	-3.43%	3,669
Le Flore	8,215	54.82%	6,536	43.62%	234	1.56%	1,679	11.20%	14,985
Lincoln	7,387	63.13%	4,140	35.38%	174	1.49%	3,247	27.25%	11,701
Logan	8,187	63.61%	4,510	35.04%	173	1.34%	3,677	28.57%	12,870
Love	1,807	53.59%	1,530	45.37%	35	1.04%	277	8.22%	3,372
McClain	6,750	64.05%	3,679	34.91%	110	1.04%	3,071	29.14%	10,539
McCurtain	6,601	62.97%	3,752	35.79%	129	1.23%	2,849	27.18%	10,482
McIntosh	3,444	44.26%	4,206	54.05%	131	1.68%	-762	-9.79%	7,781
Major	2,672	79.71%	635	18.94%	45	1.34%	2,037	60.77%	3,352
Marshall	2,641	53.90%	2,210	45.10%	49	1.00%	431	8.80%	4,900
Mayes	7,132	50.94%	6,618	47.27%	251	1.79%	514	3.67%	14,001
Murray	2,609	53.01%	2,263	45.98%	50	1.02%	346	7.03%	4,922
Muskogee	11,820	47.87%	12,520	50.70%	353	1.43%	-700	-2.83%	24,693
Noble	3,230	68.77%	1,416	30.15%	51	1.09%	1,814	38.62%	4,697
Nowata	2,069	53.75%	1,703	44.25%	77	2.00%	366	9.50%	3,849
Okfuskee	1,910	50.42%	1,814	47.89%	64	1.69%	96	2.53%	3,788
Oklahoma	139,078	62.34%	81,590	36.57%	2,443	1.09%	57,488	25.77%	223,111
Okmulgee	5,797	43.99%	7,186	54.53%	195	1.48%	-1,389	-10.54%	13,178
Osage	8,138	51.15%	7,540	47.39%	231	1.45%	598	3.76%	15,909
Ottawa	5,625	49.29%	5,647	49.49%	139	1.22%	-22	-0.20%	11,411
Pawnee	3,386	57.15%	2,435	41.10%	104	1.76%	951	16.05%	5,925
Payne	15,256	61.15%	9,319	37.36%	372	1.49%	5,937	23.79%	24,947
Pittsburg	8,514	52.05%	7,627	46.63%	216	1.32%	887	5.42%	16,357
Pontotoc	7,299	56.86%	5,387	41.97%	150	1.17%	1,912	14.89%	12,836
Pottawatomie	13,235	59.31%	8,763	39.27%	318	1.42%	4,472	20.04%	22,316
Pushmataha	2,331	53.61%	1,969	45.29%	48	1.10%	362	8.32%	4,348
Roger Mills	1,234	73.15%	441	26.14%	12	0.71%	793	47.01%	1,687
Rogers	17,713	61.18%	10,813	37.35%	425	1.47%	6,900	23.83%	28,951
Seminole	4,011	50.99%	3,783	48.09%	72	0.92%	228	2.90%	7,866
Sequoyah	6,614	53.97%	5,425	44.27%	215	1.75%	1,189	9.70%	12,254
Stephens	10,860	62.10%	6,467	36.98%	161	0.92%	4,393	25.12%	17,488
Texas	4,964	81.54%	1,084	17.81%	40	0.66%	3,880	63.73%	6,088
Tillman	1,920	57.33%	1,400	41.80%	29	0.87%	520	15.53%	3,349
Tulsa	134,152	61.34%	81,656	37.34%	2,883	1.32%	52,496	24.00%	218,691
Wagoner	12,981	60.33%	8,244	38.31%	292	1.36%	4,737	22.02%	21,517
Washington	13,788	66.47%	6,644	32.03%	312	1.50%	7,144	34.44%	20,744
Washita	2,850	63.79%	1,564	35.00%	54	1.21%	1,286	28.79%	4,468
Woods	2,774	68.56%	1,235	30.52%	37	0.91%	1,539	38.04%	4,046
Woodward	5,067	71.37%	1,950	27.46%	83	1.17%	3,117	43.91%	7,100
Totals	744,337	60.31%	474,276	38.43%	15,616	1.27%	270,061	21.88%	1,234,229

===== Counties that flipped from Democratic to Republican =====
- Atoka (Largest city: Atoka)
- Bryan (Largest city: Durant)
- Caddo (Largest city: Anadarko)
- Carter (Largest city: Ardmore)
- Coal (Largest city: Coalgate)
- Cotton (Largest city: Walters)
- Craig (Largest city: Vinita)
- Garvin (Largest city: Pauls Valley)
- Greer (Largest city: Mangum)
- Harmon (Largest city: Hollis)
- Jefferson (Largest city: Waurika)
- Johnston (Largest city: Tishomingo)
- Kiowa (Largest city: Hobart)
- Le Flore (Largest city: Poteau)
- Love (Largest city: Marietta)
- Marshall (Largest city: Madill)
- Mayes (Largest city: Pryor Creek)
- McCurtain (Largest city: Idabel)
- Murray (Largest city: Sulphur)
- Nowata (Largest city: Nowata)
- Okfuskee (Largest city: Okemah)
- Osage (Largest city: Hominy)
- Pawnee (Largest city: Cleveland)
- Pittsburg (Largest city: McAlester)
- Pontotoc (Largest city: Ada)
- Pushmataha (Largest city: Antlers)
- Seminole (Largest city: Seminole)
- Sequoyah (Largest city: Sallisaw)
- Tillman (Largest city: Frederick)

==== By congressional district ====
Bush won all six congressional districts, including one that elected a Democrat.

District	Bush	Gore	Representative
1st	62%	37%	Steve Largent
2nd	52%	46%	Tom Coburn
2nd	52%	46%	Brad Carson
3rd	56%	42%	Wes Watkins
4th	61%	38%	J. C. Watts
5th	68%	31%	Ernest Istook
6th	61%	38%	Frank Lucas

== Electors ==
The electors of each state and the District of Columbia met on December 18, 2000 to cast their votes for president and vice president. The Electoral College itself never meets as one body. Instead the electors from each state and the District of Columbia met in their respective capitols.

The following were the members of the Electoral College from the state. All were pledged to and voted for George W. Bush and Dick Cheney:

1. Steve Byas
2. James Cruson
3. Paul Hollrah
4. Kristal Markowitz
5. Bob McDowell
6. Donald O'Nesky
7. Tom Prince
8. George W. Wiland

The slates of electors for the defeated candidates are as follows:

Reform: Robert Kiwanis Bell, Jr., Isabel Faith Lyman, Patrick S. J. Carmack, Ivette P. Farmer, Earl David Shaffer, William Bruce Charles, Gregory D. Brown, Mary Patricia Ziglinski

Democrat: George Nigh, Carma Lee Brock, Edmund Synar, Beulah Vernon, Jay Parmley, Rhonda Walters, Mary Jac Rauh, Obera Bergdall

Libertarian: Charles Burris, Agnes Regier, Christine M. Kane, Mary Laurent, Anne Fruits, Jack Litherland, David Lewis, Lynn Atherton

== See also ==
- United States presidential elections in Oklahoma
- Presidency of George W. Bush
