= McQueen, Oklahoma =

Unincorporated community in Oklahoma, US

Coordinates: 34°40′00″N 99°42′06″W

McQueen is an unincorporated settlement in Harmon County, Oklahoma, United States. It is located 4 miles (6.4 km) east of Gould on U.S. 62.
