= Arnett, Harmon County, Oklahoma =

- Unincorporated community
- Location within Oklahoma Location within the United States
- Coordinates: 34°44′50″N 99°57′54″W
- Country: United States
- State: Oklahoma
- County: Harmon
- Elevation: 1,752 ft (534 m)
- Time zone: UTC-6 (Central (CST))
  - Summer (DST): UTC-5 (CDT)
- GNIS feature ID: 1089706

Arnett is an unincorporated community in Harmon County, Oklahoma, United States. It is located five miles northwest of Hollis. A rural school was located in Arnett on Route 2. The school, along with Harmon County's other rural schools, was annexed into the Hollis school district.
