= Al Coppage =

American football player (1916–1992)

- Coppage in 1946

No. 54, 53
- Position: End

Personal information
- Born: February 9, 1916; Pilot Point, Texas, U.S.
- Died: January 9, 1992 (aged 75); Altus, Oklahoma, U.S.
- Listed height: 6 ft 2 in (1.88 m)
- Listed weight: 195 lb (88 kg)

Career information
- High school: Hollis (Hollis, Oklahoma)
- College: Oklahoma
- NFL draft: 1940: 13th round, 111th overall pick

Career history
- Chicago Cardinals (1940–1942); Cleveland Browns (1946); Buffalo Bills (AAFC) (1947)

Awards and highlights
- AAFC champion (1946)

Career NFL statistics
- Receptions: 43
- Receiving yards: 476
- Touchdowns: 1
- Stats at Pro Football Reference

Alton Minor Coppage (February 9, 1916 – January 9, 1992) was an American professional football player who was an end for five seasons in the National Football League (NFL) and All-America Football Conference (AAFC), primarily with the Chicago Cardinals. Coppage grew up in Oklahoma and played college football for the Oklahoma Sooners. He was member of their 1938 team that won the school's first Big Six Conference championship. He was selected by the Cardinals in the 1940 NFL draft. He played in Chicago for three seasons before leaving to serve in World War II. He signed with the Cleveland Browns in the AAFC after his discharge from the military and played one season for the team, moving to the Buffalo Bills in 1947. After leaving football, Coppage settled in Oklahoma and worked in lumber and banking. He died in 1992.

== Career ==
Coppage grew up in Hollis, Oklahoma and attended the University of Oklahoma in Norman. He played football as an end for the Oklahoma Sooners for three years starting as a sophomore in 1937. Coppage was a member of a 1938 Sooners team that went undefeated and was ranked fourth in the country by the Associated Press before losing in the Orange Bowl to Tennessee. Despite the bowl-game loss, the Sooners won their first-ever Big Six Conference championship.

Coppage was selected by the Chicago Cardinals in the 1940 NFL draft. He played for the team for three seasons before leaving to serve in the Pacific theater of World War II. After returning from service as a corporal in the Twentieth Air Force, he was acquired in 1946 by the Cleveland Browns, a team under formation in the All-America Football Conference. In his one year with the Browns, the team won the league championship. Coppage played for the Buffalo Bills in 1947, his last year in professional football.

== Later life and death ==
After retiring from football, Coppage worked in the lumber business and subsequently in banking, spending 20 years as first vice president of First State Bank of Gould, Oklahoma for 20 years. The bank was robbed in 1975 when Coppage was working there with his wife Lillian, an assistant cashier. Two bearded men entered the bank and pistol-whipped Coppage and another bank executive. They stole $300 and abducted two female employees, took them to an abandoned garage and shot both in the head and face; one of them died. Two men were apprehended and charged with the crime.

Coppage died in 1992 at Jackson County Memorial Hospital in Altus, Oklahoma.
