= United States presidential elections in Oklahoma =

Presidential elections in Oklahoma
- Number of elections: 30
- Voted Democratic: 10
- Voted Republican: 20
- Voted other: 0
- Voted for winning candidate: 21
- Voted for losing candidate: 9

Oklahoma is a state in the South Central region of the United States. Since it joined the United States in 1907, Oklahoma has participated in 29 presidential elections. It was initially granted seven electoral votes, gaining three following the 1910 census. It was given an additional vote in the 1930 census, which it later lost in the 1940 census. The state's electoral votes were reduced to eight in the 1950 census before returning to its original seven following the 2000 census.

In the 1960 election, Republican candidates Richard Nixon and Henry C. Lodge won Oklahoma. However, elector Henry D. Irwin decided to cast a faithless vote for Harry F. Byrd and Barry Goldwater. An amendment to the Constitution of Oklahoma had been passed earlier to allow political parties to select their own electors. However, the amendment did not go effect until 1964. In 1961, the state passed a law that would invalidate any votes cast by and issue a fine to faithless electors.

Oklahoma initially was strongly Democratic, with Democratic candidates winning the state's electoral votes 9 out of 11 times between 1908-1948, but it has come to be considered a safely red state. Republicans have won every single county in Oklahoma since the 2004 presidential election. The last Democrat to win the state was Lyndon B. Johnson in his 1964 landslide victory. Oklahoma was last considered a swing state during the presidential campaigns of Southern Democratic Governors of Jimmy Carter (1976 and 1980) and Bill Clinton (1992 and 1996).

Republicans have won the White House without winning Oklahoma only twice: William Howard Taft in 1908 and Calvin Coolidge in 1924. Democrats have won without the state seven times, most recently in Joe Biden's victory in 2020.

== Presidential elections ==
Key for parties
American Independent Party – (AI)
Democratic Party – (D)
Independent candidate – (I)
Libertarian Party – (LI)
Prohibition Party – (PRO)
Progressive Party (1924) – (PR)
Reform Party – (RE)
Republican Party – (R)
Socialist Party of America – (S)

Note: A double dagger (‡) indicates the national winner.
Note: Percentages may not total 100.0%.

Election results
Year	Winner			Runner-up			Other candidate (Note: For the purposes of this table, other candidates are defined as those who were in third place in Oklahoma. Some elections did not have a qualified third-party candidate.)			EV	Ref.
Year	Candidate	Votes	%	Candidate	Votes	%	Candidate	Votes	%	EV	Ref.
1908	William Jennings Bryan (D)	122,363	47.99%	William Howard Taft (R)‡	110,474	43.33%	Eugene V. Debs (S)	21,734	8.52%	7	
1912	Woodrow Wilson (D)‡	119,156	46.95%	William Howard Taft (R)	90,786	35.77%	Eugene V. Debs (S)	41,674	16.42%	10	
1916	Woodrow Wilson (D)‡	148,113	50.65%	Charles Evans Hughes (R)	97,233	33.25%	Allan L. Benson (S)	45,190	15.45%	10	
1920	Warren G. Harding (R) ‡	243,831	50.11%	James M. Cox (D)	217,053	44.61%	Eugene V. Debs (S)	25,726	5.29%	10	
1924	John W. Davis (D)	255,798	48.41%	Calvin Coolidge (R) ‡	226,242	42.82%	Robert M. La Follette (PR)	46,375	8.78%	10	
1928	Herbert Hoover (R)‡	394,046	63.72%	Al Smith (D)	219,174	35.44%	Norman Thomas (S)	3,924	0.63%	10	
1932	Franklin D. Roosevelt (D)‡	516,468	73.30%	Herbert Hoover (R)	188,165	26.70%	–	–	–	11	
1936	Franklin D. Roosevelt (D)‡	501,069	66.83%	Alf Landon (R)	245,122	32.69%	Norman Thomas (S)	2,221	0.30%	11	
1940	Franklin D. Roosevelt (D)‡	474,313	57.41%	Wendell Willkie (R)	348,872	42.23%	Roger Babson (PRO)	3,027	0.37%	10	
1944	Franklin D. Roosevelt (D)‡	401,549	55.57%	Thomas E. Dewey (R)	319,424	44.20%	Claude A. Watson (PRO)	1,663	0.23%	10	
1948	Harry S. Truman (D)‡	452,782	62.75%	Thomas E. Dewey (R)	268,817	37.25%	–	–	–	10	
1952	Dwight D. Eisenhower (R) ‡	518,045	54.59%	Adlai Stevenson (D)	430,939	45.41%	–	–	–	8	
1956	Dwight D. Eisenhower (R) ‡	473,769	55.13%	Adlai Stevenson (D)	385,581	44.87%	–	–	–	8	
1960	Richard Nixon (R) (Note: Elector Henry D. Irwin faithlessly voted for presidential candidate Harry F. Byrd and vice-presidential candidate Barry Goldwater.)	533,039	59.02%	John F. Kennedy (D) ‡	370,111	40.98%	–	–	–	8	
1964	Lyndon B. Johnson (D) ‡	519,834	55.75%	Barry Goldwater (R)	412,665	44.25%	–	–	–	8	
1968	Richard Nixon (R) ‡	449,697	46.66%	Hubert Humphrey (D)	301,658	31.30%	George Wallace (AI)	191,731	19.89%	8	
1972	Richard Nixon (R) ‡	759,025	71.78%	George McGovern (D)	247,147	23.37%	John G. Schmitz (AI)	23,728	2.24%	8	
1976	Gerald Ford (R)	545,708	49.87%	Jimmy Carter (D) ‡	532,442	48.66%	Eugene McCarthy (I)	14,101	1.29%	8	
1980	Ronald Reagan (R) ‡	695,570	59.33%	Jimmy Carter (D)	402,026	34.29%	Ed Clark (LI)	13,828	1.18%	8	
1984	Ronald Reagan (R) ‡	861,530	68.61%	Walter Mondale (D)	385,080	30.67%	David Bergland (LI)	9,066	0.72%	8	
1988	George H. W. Bush (R) ‡	678,367	58.24%	Michael Dukakis (D)	483,423	41.50%	Ron Paul (LI)	2,985	0.26%	8	
1992	George H. W. Bush (R)	592,929	42.65%	Bill Clinton (D) ‡	473,066	34.02%	Ross Perot (I)	353,741	23.01%	8	
1996	Bob Dole (R)	582,315	48.22%	Bill Clinton (D) ‡	488,105	40.42%	Ross Perot (RE)	130,788	10.83%	8	
2000	George W. Bush (R) ‡	744,337	60.31%	Al Gore (D)	474,276	38.43%	Pat Buchanan (RE)	9,014	0.73%	8	
2004	George W. Bush (R)‡	959,792	65.57%	John Kerry (D)	503,966	34.43%	–	–	–	7	
2008	John McCain (R)	960,165	65.65%	Barack Obama (D)‡	502,496	34.35%	–	–	–	7	
2012	Mitt Romney (R)	891,325	66.77%	Barack Obama (D)‡	443,547	33.30%	–	–	–	7	
2016	Donald Trump (R)‡	949,136	65.32%	Hillary Clinton (D)	420,375	28.93%	Gary Johnson (LI)	83,481	5.75%	7	
2020	Donald Trump (R)	1,020,280	65.37%	Joe Biden (D)‡	503,890	32.29%	Jo Jorgensen (LI)	24,731	1.58%	7	
2024	Donald Trump (R)‡	1,036,213	66.16%	Kamala Harris (D)	499,599	31.90%	Robert F. Kennedy Jr. (I)	16,020	1.02%	7	

== See also ==
- Elections in Oklahoma
- List of United States presidential election results by state
