= United States Post Office Hollis =

- U.S. National Register of Historic Places
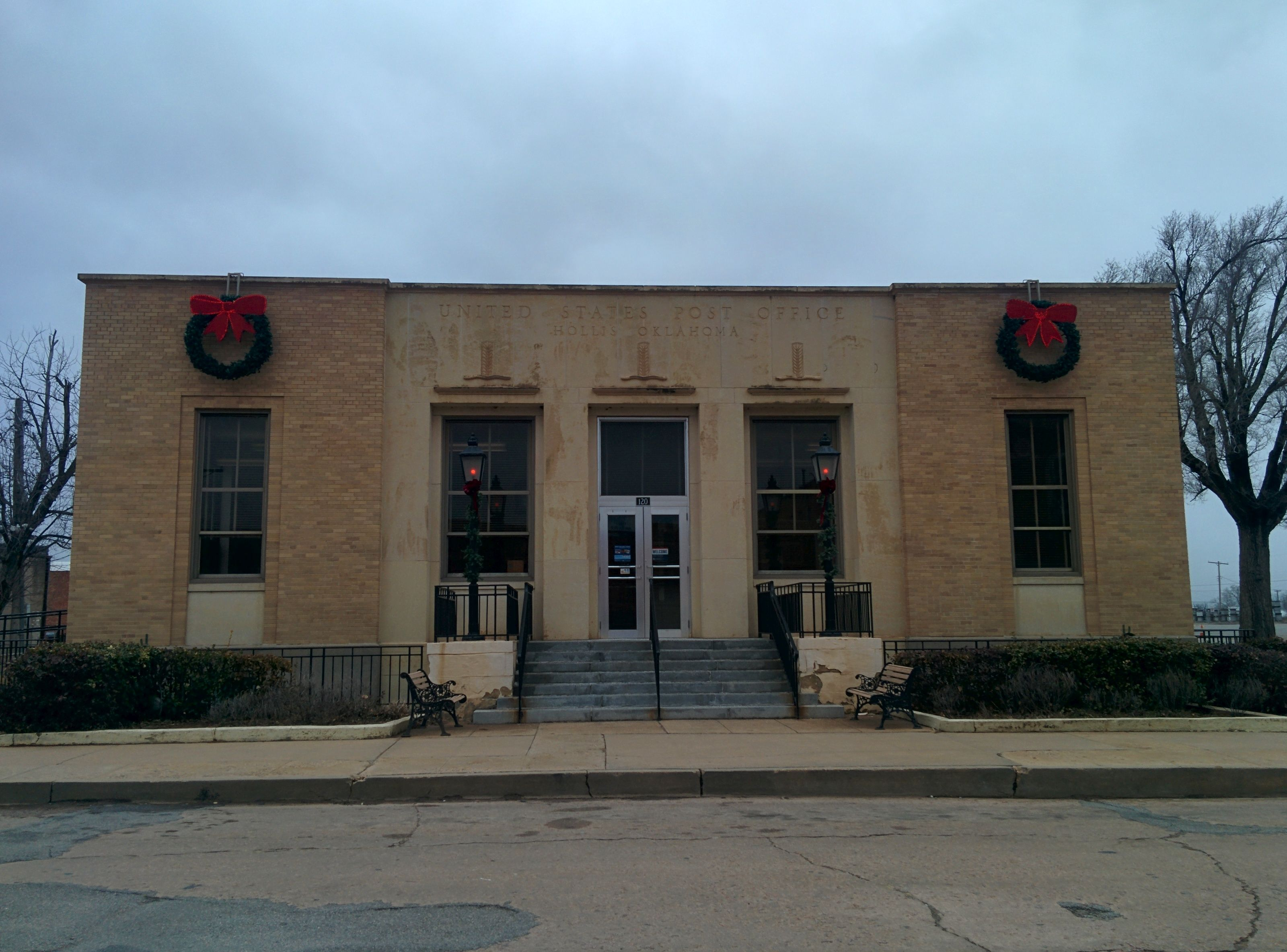

- Location within Oklahoma
- Location: 120 N. 2nd St., Hollis, Oklahoma
- Coordinates: 34°40′57″N 99°55′11″W
- Area: less than one acre
- Built: 1939
- Architect: Louis Simon
- Architectural style: Art Deco
- MPS: Oklahoma Post Offices with Section Art MPS
- NRHP reference No.: 09000215
- Added to NRHP: April 17, 2009

The United States Post Office Hollis, at 120 N. 2nd St. in Hollis, Oklahoma, was built in 1939. It was listed on the National Register of Historic Places in 2009.

It includes a New Deal program mural by artist Lloyd Lozes Goff, described in its NRHP nomination:

Mapping the Trail depicts five trail riders discussing the route of their cattle drive in the midst of their dilapidated camp. Their denim attire seems to mark them as early twentieth century cowboys, and the landscape with its rust-colored soil and sparse vegetation suggests the southwestern landscape of Oklahoma, although Goff may have used New Mexican terrain. The sod dwelling adorned with a horseshoe and a cattle skull offers contradictory messages of luck and the passing of life, respectively. With the coming storms in the background, Goff crafts an image of the uncertain life of the cowboy, often fraught with economic and environmental challenges. Cattle drives had become increasingly rare in the early twentieth century and the romantic cowboy that Goff depicts in Mapping the Trail was disappearing from the southwestern landscape during his lifetime.

== See also ==
- List of United States post office murals
