= 1912 United States presidential election in Oklahoma =

- November 5, 1912

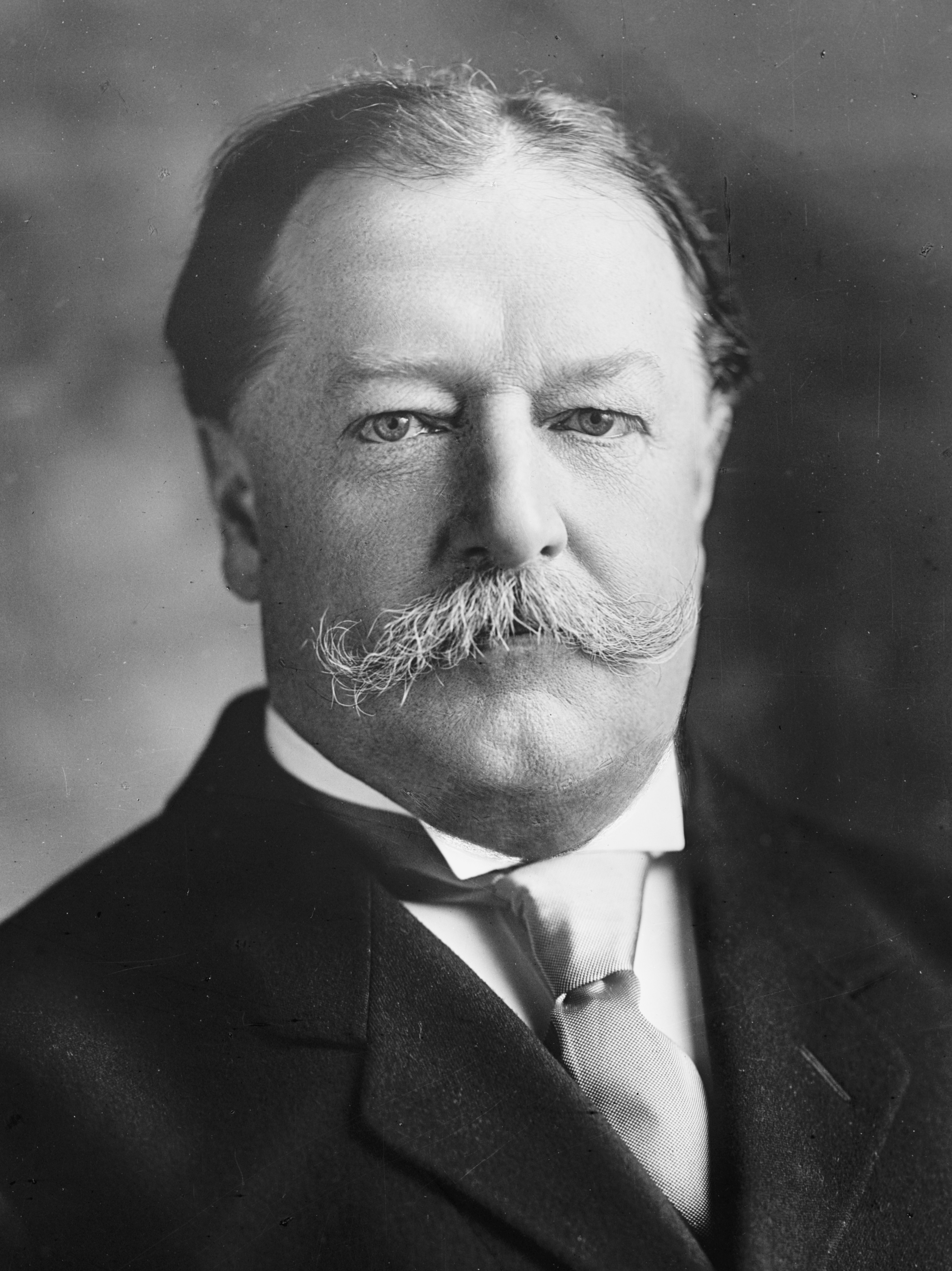

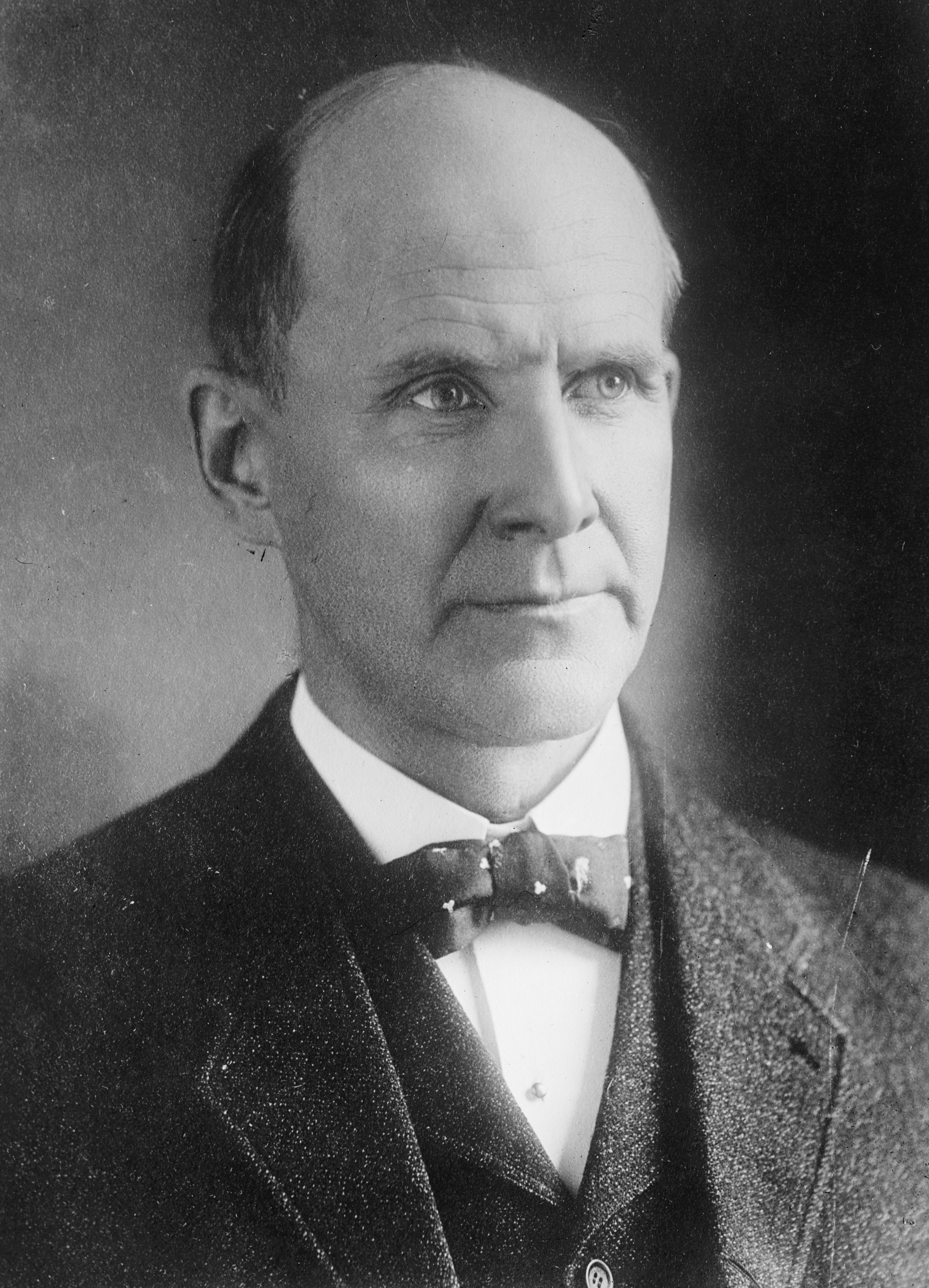
| Nominee | Woodrow Wilson | William Howard Taft | Eugene V. Debs |
| Party | Democratic | Republican | Socialist |
| Home state | New Jersey | Ohio | Indiana |
| Running mate | Thomas R. Marshall | Nicholas Murray Butler | Emil Seidel |
| Electoral vote | 10 | 0 | 0 |
| Popular vote | 119,156 | 90,786 | 41,674 |
| Percentage | 46.95% | 35.77% | 16.42% |
County results
Wilson
40–50%
50–60%
60–70%
Taft
30–40%
40–50%
50–60%
President before election
William Howard Taft
Republican
Elected President
Woodrow Wilson
Democratic

The 1912 United States presidential election in Oklahoma took place on November 5, 1912, as part of the 1912 United States presidential election. Voters chose ten representatives, or electors, to the Electoral College, who voted for president and vice president.

Oklahoma was won by the Democratic nominees, governor of New Jersey Woodrow Wilson and governor of Indiana Thomas R. Marshall, with 46.95 percent of the popular vote, against the Republican ticket of incumbent president William Howard Taft (R–Ohio), running with Columbia University President Nicholas Murray Butler, with 35.77 percent of the popular vote, and the five-time candidate of the Socialist Party of America for President of the United States Eugene V. Debs (S–Indiana), running with the first Socialist mayor of a major city in the United States Emil Seidel, with 16.42 percent of the popular vote.

Oklahoma was the second best state in percentage points for Socialist candidate Eugene V. Debs with 16.42 percent with Nevada being his best with 16.47 percent. This was also the only state in which the Progressive Party candidates, former president Theodore Roosevelt and his running mate, governor of California Hiram Johnson, were not on the ballot.

== Results ==
1912 United States presidential election in Oklahoma (Note: There are some differences in the totals between Dave Leip’s and those of Eugene Robinson that were used by Géoelections and are quoted for the county table.)
| Party | Candidate | Votes | % |
|---|---|---|---|
| Democratic | Woodrow Wilson | 119,156 | 46.95% |
| Republican | William Howard Taft (incumbent) | 90,786 | 35.77% |
| Socialist | Eugene V. Debs | 41,674 | 16.42% |
| Prohibition | Eugene W. Chafin | 2,185 | 0.86% |
| Total votes | | 253,801 | 100% |

=== Results by county ===
| County | Woodrow Wilson Democratic | | William Howard Taft Republican | | Eugene V. Debs Socialist | | Eugene Chafin Prohibition | | Margin | | Total votes cast |
| County | # | % | # | % | # | % | # | % | # | % | Total votes cast |
|---|---|---|---|---|---|---|---|---|---|---|---|
| Adair | 916 | 47.51% | 850 | 44.09% | 151 | 7.83% | 11 | 0.57% | 66 | 3.42% | 1,928 |
| Alfalfa | 1,179 | 34.91% | 1,714 | 50.76% | 395 | 11.70% | 89 | 2.64% | -535 | -15.84% | 3,377 |
| Atoka | 1,100 | 46.89% | 669 | 28.52% | 566 | 24.13% | 11 | 0.47% | 431 | 18.37% | 2,346 |
| Beaver | 926 | 36.80% | 1,070 | 42.53% | 446 | 17.73% | 74 | 2.94% | -144 | -5.72% | 2,516 |
| Beckham | 1,566 | 50.42% | 648 | 20.86% | 871 | 28.04% | 21 | 0.68% | 695 (Note: In this county where Debs ran second ahead of Taft, the margin given is that between Wilson and Debs.) | 22.38% | 3,106 |
| Blaine | 744 | 38.17% | 831 | 42.64% | 350 | 17.96% | 24 | 1.23% | -87 | -4.46% | 1,949 |
| Bryan | 2,278 | 59.76% | 711 | 18.65% | 809 | 21.22% | 14 | 0.37% | 1,469 | 38.54% | 3,812 |
| Caddo | 2,514 | 42.08% | 2,413 | 40.38% | 993 | 16.62% | 55 | 0.92% | 101 | 1.69% | 5,975 |
| Canadian | 2,047 | 48.51% | 1,794 | 42.51% | 337 | 7.99% | 42 | 1.00% | 253 | 6.00% | 4,220 |
| Carter | 1,860 | 57.67% | 652 | 20.22% | 702 | 21.77% | 11 | 0.34% | 1,158 | 35.91% | 3,225 |
| Cherokee | 1,094 | 49.64% | 962 | 43.65% | 139 | 6.31% | 9 | 0.41% | 132 | 5.99% | 2,204 |
| Choctaw | 1,392 | 49.59% | 692 | 24.65% | 703 | 25.04% | 20 | 0.71% | 689 | 24.55% | 2,807 |
| Cimarron | 342 | 48.10% | 263 | 36.99% | 94 | 13.22% | 12 | 1.69% | 79 | 11.11% | 711 |
| Cleveland | 1,471 | 51.40% | 938 | 32.77% | 424 | 14.81% | 29 | 1.01% | 533 | 18.62% | 2,862 |
| Coal | 1,109 | 48.15% | 571 | 24.79% | 623 | 27.05% | 0 | 0.00% | 486 | 21.10% | 2,303 |
| Comanche | 1,931 | 49.73% | 1,320 | 33.99% | 606 | 15.61% | 26 | 0.67% | 611 | 15.74% | 3,883 |
| Cotton | 1,063 | 54.85% | 587 | 30.29% | 269 | 13.88% | 19 | 0.98% | 476 | 24.56% | 1,938 |
| Craig | 1,772 | 53.93% | 1,391 | 42.33% | 113 | 3.44% | 10 | 0.30% | 381 | 11.59% | 3,286 |
| Creek | 1,676 | 36.64% | 1,902 | 41.58% | 948 | 20.73% | 48 | 1.05% | -226 | -4.94% | 4,574 |
| Custer | 1,777 | 44.28% | 1,693 | 42.19% | 505 | 12.58% | 38 | 0.95% | 84 | 2.09% | 4,013 |
| Delaware | 983 | 51.71% | 732 | 38.51% | 176 | 9.26% | 10 | 0.53% | 251 | 13.20% | 1,901 |
| Dewey | 1,075 | 36.42% | 1,086 | 36.79% | 768 | 26.02% | 23 | 0.78% | -11 | -0.37% | 2,952 |
| Ellis | 918 | 32.80% | 1,373 | 49.05% | 471 | 16.83% | 37 | 1.32% | -455 | -16.26% | 2,799 |
| Garfield | 2,353 | 41.14% | 2,900 | 50.71% | 398 | 6.96% | 68 | 1.19% | -547 | -9.56% | 5,719 |
| Garvin | 2,114 | 53.93% | 740 | 18.88% | 1,051 | 26.81% | 15 | 0.38% | 1,063 | 27.12% | 3,920 |
| Grady | 2,577 | 57.60% | 1,121 | 25.06% | 757 | 16.92% | 19 | 0.42% | 1,456 | 32.54% | 4,474 |
| Grant | 1,558 | 42.70% | 1,729 | 47.38% | 259 | 7.10% | 103 | 2.82% | -171 | -4.69% | 3,649 |
| Greer | 1,334 | 63.86% | 351 | 16.80% | 385 | 18.43% | 19 | 0.91% | 949 | 45.43% | 2,089 |
| Harmon | 895 | 64.71% | 197 | 14.24% | 279 | 20.17% | 12 | 0.87% | 616 | 44.54% | 1,383 |
| Harper | 523 | 34.75% | 679 | 45.12% | 280 | 18.60% | 23 | 1.53% | -156 | -10.37% | 1,505 |
| Haskell | 1,388 | 46.66% | 902 | 30.32% | 672 | 22.59% | 13 | 0.44% | 486 | 16.34% | 2,975 |
| Hughes | 1,769 | 44.21% | 1,228 | 30.69% | 984 | 24.59% | 20 | 0.50% | 541 | 13.52% | 4,001 |
| Jackson | 1,819 | 58.79% | 588 | 19.00% | 652 | 21.07% | 35 | 1.13% | 1,167 | 37.72% | 3,094 |
| Jefferson | 1,118 | 51.95% | 361 | 16.78% | 660 | 30.67% | 13 | 0.60% | 458 | 21.28% | 2,152 |
| Johnston | 1,289 | 50.49% | 506 | 19.82% | 741 | 29.02% | 17 | 0.67% | 548 | 21.46% | 2,553 |
| Kay | 2,380 | 44.57% | 2,508 | 46.97% | 375 | 7.02% | 77 | 1.44% | -128 | -2.40% | 5,340 |
| Kingfisher | 1,235 | 39.63% | 1,527 | 49.01% | 318 | 10.21% | 36 | 1.16% | -292 | -9.37% | 3,116 |
| Kiowa | 1,831 | 46.40% | 1,167 | 29.57% | 918 | 23.26% | 30 | 0.76% | 664 | 16.83% | 3,946 |
| Latimer | 722 | 46.49% | 482 | 31.04% | 342 | 22.02% | 7 | 0.45% | 240 | 15.45% | 1,553 |
| Le Flore | 2,009 | 49.30% | 1,538 | 37.74% | 507 | 12.44% | 21 | 0.52% | 471 | 11.56% | 4,075 |
| Lincoln | 2,137 | 38.39% | 2,459 | 44.17% | 915 | 16.44% | 56 | 1.01% | -322 | -5.78% | 5,567 |
| Logan | 1,700 | 35.34% | 2,546 | 52.92% | 481 | 10.00% | 84 | 1.75% | -846 | -17.58% | 4,811 |
| Love | 750 | 55.11% | 199 | 14.62% | 407 | 29.90% | 5 | 0.37% | 343 | 25.20% | 1,361 |
| Major | 689 | 27.62% | 1,210 | 48.50% | 545 | 21.84% | 51 | 2.04% | -521 | -20.88% | 2,495 |
| Marshall | 958 | 48.51% | 315 | 15.95% | 690 | 34.94% | 12 | 0.61% | 268 | 13.57% | 1,975 |
| Mayes | 1,391 | 51.81% | 1,079 | 40.19% | 202 | 7.52% | 13 | 0.48% | 312 | 11.62% | 2,685 |
| McClain | 1,273 | 55.93% | 583 | 25.62% | 409 | 17.97% | 11 | 0.48% | 690 | 30.32% | 2,276 |
| McCurtain | 1,059 | 40.56% | 704 | 26.96% | 831 | 31.83% | 17 | 0.65% | 228 | 8.73% | 2,611 |
| McIntosh | 1,325 | 46.74% | 970 | 34.22% | 528 | 18.62% | 12 | 0.42% | 355 | 12.52% | 2,835 |
| Murray | 987 | 52.95% | 321 | 17.22% | 550 | 29.51% | 6 | 0.32% | 437 | 23.44% | 1,864 |
| Muskogee | 3,681 | 55.76% | 2,385 | 36.13% | 513 | 7.77% | 23 | 0.35% | 1,296 | 19.63% | 6,602 |
| Noble | 1,188 | 43.25% | 1,266 | 46.09% | 270 | 9.83% | 23 | 0.84% | -78 | -2.84% | 2,747 |
| Nowata | 1,012 | 44.56% | 1,087 | 47.86% | 146 | 6.43% | 26 | 1.14% | -75 | -3.30% | 2,271 |
| Okfuskee | 952 | 40.63% | 651 | 27.78% | 724 | 30.90% | 16 | 0.68% | 228 | 9.73% | 2,343 |
| Oklahoma | 6,963 | 51.30% | 5,706 | 42.04% | 822 | 6.06% | 83 | 0.61% | 1,257 | 9.26% | 13,574 |
| Okmulgee | 1,243 | 42.14% | 1,140 | 38.64% | 540 | 18.31% | 27 | 0.92% | 103 | 3.49% | 2,950 |
| Osage | 1,900 | 46.33% | 1,713 | 41.77% | 467 | 11.39% | 21 | 0.51% | 187 | 4.56% | 4,101 |
| Ottawa | 1,384 | 48.19% | 1,315 | 45.79% | 165 | 5.75% | 8 | 0.28% | 69 | 2.40% | 2,872 |
| Pawnee | 1,316 | 42.15% | 1,332 | 42.66% | 443 | 14.19% | 31 | 0.99% | -16 | -0.51% | 3,122 |
| Payne | 1,534 | 38.24% | 1,669 | 41.61% | 737 | 18.37% | 71 | 1.77% | -135 | -3.37% | 4,011 |
| Pittsburg | 2,767 | 47.55% | 1,574 | 27.05% | 1,443 | 24.80% | 35 | 0.60% | 1,193 | 20.50% | 5,819 |
| Pontotoc | 1,842 | 53.81% | 642 | 18.76% | 921 | 26.91% | 18 | 0.53% | 921 | 26.91% | 3,423 |
| Pottawatomie | 3,082 | 49.56% | 2,075 | 33.37% | 1,021 | 16.42% | 41 | 0.66% | 1,007 | 16.19% | 6,219 |
| Pushmataha | 747 | 43.53% | 479 | 27.91% | 482 | 28.09% | 8 | 0.47% | 265 | 15.44% | 1,716 |
| Roger Mills | 902 | 41.19% | 716 | 32.69% | 555 | 25.34% | 17 | 0.78% | 186 | 8.49% | 2,190 |
| Rogers | 1,637 | 48.92% | 1,258 | 37.60% | 432 | 12.91% | 19 | 0.57% | 379 | 11.33% | 3,346 |
| Seminole | 1,172 | 44.18% | 715 | 26.95% | 749 | 28.23% | 17 | 0.64% | 423 | 15.94% | 2,653 |
| Sequoyah | 1,416 | 51.55% | 1,099 | 40.01% | 220 | 8.01% | 12 | 0.44% | 317 | 11.54% | 2,747 |
| Stephens | 1,735 | 53.65% | 598 | 18.49% | 882 | 27.27% | 19 | 0.59% | 853 | 26.38% | 3,234 |
| Texas | 764 | 44.24% | 683 | 39.55% | 239 | 13.84% | 41 | 2.37% | 81 | 4.69% | 1,727 |
| Tillman | 1,801 | 64.02% | 638 | 22.68% | 353 | 12.55% | 21 | 0.75% | 1,163 | 41.34% | 2,813 |
| Tulsa | 2,747 | 51.37% | 2,029 | 37.95% | 523 | 9.78% | 48 | 0.90% | 718 | 13.43% | 5,347 |
| Wagoner | 888 | 51.51% | 555 | 32.19% | 270 | 15.66% | 11 | 0.64% | 333 | 19.32% | 1,724 |
| Washington | 1,561 | 46.62% | 1,447 | 43.22% | 315 | 9.41% | 25 | 0.75% | 114 | 3.41% | 3,348 |
| Washita | 1,663 | 47.07% | 1,100 | 31.14% | 734 | 20.78% | 36 | 1.02% | 563 | 15.94% | 3,533 |
| Woods | 1,247 | 35.95% | 1,679 | 48.40% | 501 | 14.44% | 42 | 1.21% | -432 | -12.45% | 3,469 |
| Woodward | 1,083 | 35.14% | 1,403 | 45.52% | 568 | 18.43% | 28 | 0.91% | -320 | -10.38% | 3,082 |
| Totals | 119,143 | 46.96% | 90,726 | 35.76% | 41,630 | 16.41% | 2,195 | 0.87% | 28,417 | 11.20% | 253,694 |

== See also ==
- United States presidential elections in Oklahoma
