= 1940 United States presidential election in Oklahoma =

- November 5, 1940

All 11 Oklahoma votes to the Electoral College

Nominee	Franklin D. Roosevelt	Wendell Willkie
Party	Democratic	Republican
Home state	New York	New York
Running mate	Henry A. Wallace	Charles L. McNary
Electoral vote	11	0
Popular vote	474,313	348,872
Percentage	57.41%	42.23%
County results
Roosevelt
50–60%
60–70%
70–80%
80–90%
Willkie
50–60%
60–70%
70–80%
President before election
Franklin D. Roosevelt
Democratic
Elected President
Franklin D. Roosevelt
Democratic

The 1940 United States presidential election in Oklahoma took place on November 5, 1940, as part of the 1940 United States presidential election. Voters chose 11 representatives, or electors, to the Electoral College, who voted for president and vice president.

Oklahoma was won by incumbent President Franklin D. Roosevelt (D–New York), running with Secretary Henry A. Wallace, with 57.41% of the popular vote, against Wendell Willkie (R–New York), running with Minority Leader Charles L. McNary, with 42.23% of the popular vote.

== Results ==
1940 United States presidential election in Oklahoma
Party	Candidate	Votes	%
Democratic	Franklin D. Roosevelt (inc.)	474,313	57.41%
Republican	Wendell Willkie	348,872	42.23%
Prohibition	Roger Babson	3,027	0.37%
Total votes		826,212	100%

=== Results by county ===
County	Franklin D. Roosevelt Democratic		Wendell Willkie Republican		Roger Babson Prohibition		Margin		Total votes cast
County	#	%	#	%	#	%	#	%	Total votes cast
Adair	3,203	49.40%	3,275	50.51%	6	0.09%	-72	-1.11%	6,484
Alfalfa	2,720	42.14%	3,675	56.93%	60	0.93%	-955	-14.79%	6,455
Atoka	3,601	61.75%	2,218	38.03%	13	0.22%	1,383	23.71%	5,832
Beaver	2,034	47.50%	2,219	51.82%	29	0.68%	-185	-4.32%	4,282
Beckham	4,598	67.79%	2,148	31.67%	37	0.55%	2,450	36.12%	6,783
Blaine	3,095	42.89%	4,080	56.54%	41	0.57%	-985	-13.65%	7,216
Bryan	9,095	80.42%	2,190	19.36%	25	0.22%	6,905	61.05%	11,310
Caddo	8,280	56.54%	6,304	43.05%	61	0.42%	1,976	13.49%	14,645
Canadian	5,506	53.79%	4,699	45.90%	32	0.31%	807	7.88%	10,237
Carter	10,441	75.96%	3,270	23.79%	35	0.25%	7,171	52.17%	13,746
Cherokee	3,952	48.80%	4,128	50.98%	18	0.22%	-176	-2.17%	8,098
Choctaw	5,177	68.47%	2,365	31.28%	19	0.25%	2,812	37.19%	7,561
Cimarron	989	53.37%	841	45.39%	23	1.24%	148	7.99%	1,853
Cleveland	5,933	61.48%	3,660	37.93%	57	0.59%	2,273	23.55%	9,650
Coal	2,377	67.24%	1,148	32.48%	10	0.28%	1,229	34.77%	3,535
Comanche	6,796	64.51%	3,703	35.15%	36	0.34%	3,093	29.36%	10,535
Cotton	3,121	65.57%	1,616	33.95%	23	0.48%	1,505	31.62%	4,760
Craig	4,316	54.52%	3,582	45.24%	19	0.24%	734	9.27%	7,917
Creek	10,976	53.55%	9,468	46.20%	51	0.25%	1,508	7.36%	20,495
Custer	4,612	57.14%	3,419	42.36%	40	0.50%	1,193	14.78%	8,071
Delaware	3,417	50.70%	3,305	49.04%	17	0.25%	112	1.66%	6,739
Dewey	2,391	47.46%	2,613	51.87%	34	0.67%	-222	-4.41%	5,038
Ellis	1,657	43.20%	2,162	56.36%	17	0.44%	-505	-13.16%	3,836
Garfield	9,544	46.55%	10,792	52.64%	166	0.81%	-1,248	-6.09%	20,502
Garvin	7,001	70.02%	2,958	29.58%	40	0.40%	4,043	40.43%	9,999
Grady	8,075	65.03%	4,299	34.62%	43	0.35%	3,776	30.41%	12,417
Grant	2,970	46.39%	3,394	53.01%	38	0.59%	-424	-6.62%	6,402
Greer	3,524	74.35%	1,195	25.21%	21	0.44%	2,329	49.14%	4,740
Harmon	2,292	75.37%	731	24.04%	18	0.59%	1,561	51.33%	3,041
Harper	1,419	46.18%	1,616	52.59%	38	1.24%	-197	-6.41%	3,073
Haskell	3,896	59.34%	2,661	40.53%	9	0.14%	1,235	18.81%	6,566
Hughes	6,005	65.31%	3,168	34.46%	21	0.23%	2,837	30.86%	9,194
Jackson	4,832	75.41%	1,540	24.03%	36	0.56%	3,292	51.37%	6,408
Jefferson	3,814	75.38%	1,226	24.23%	20	0.40%	2,588	51.15%	5,060
Johnston	2,955	68.26%	1,362	31.46%	12	0.28%	1,593	36.80%	4,329
Kay	10,725	51.36%	10,003	47.90%	156	0.75%	722	3.46%	20,884
Kingfisher	2,865	43.36%	3,718	56.27%	25	0.38%	-853	-12.91%	6,608
Kiowa	4,679	64.52%	2,539	35.01%	34	0.47%	2,140	29.51%	7,252
Latimer	3,138	65.84%	1,600	33.57%	28	0.59%	1,538	32.27%	4,766
Le Flore	8,379	64.03%	4,664	35.64%	44	0.34%	3,715	28.39%	13,087
Lincoln	5,271	45.54%	6,269	54.16%	34	0.29%	-998	-8.62%	11,574
Logan	4,752	46.47%	5,427	53.08%	46	0.45%	-675	-6.60%	10,225
Love	2,485	78.07%	687	21.58%	11	0.35%	1,798	56.49%	3,183
Major	1,404	28.71%	3,453	70.60%	34	0.70%	-2,049	-41.89%	4,891
Marshall	2,723	72.23%	1,032	27.37%	15	0.40%	1,691	44.85%	3,770
Mayes	4,057	52.63%	3,631	47.10%	21	0.27%	426	5.53%	7,709
McClain	3,768	66.80%	1,862	33.01%	11	0.20%	1,906	33.79%	5,641
McCurtain	6,994	75.63%	2,225	24.06%	29	0.31%	4,769	51.57%	9,248
McIntosh	3,771	51.84%	3,487	47.93%	17	0.23%	284	3.90%	7,275
Murray	3,126	71.35%	1,238	28.26%	17	0.39%	1,888	43.10%	4,381
Muskogee	12,917	57.28%	9,585	42.50%	49	0.22%	3,332	14.78%	22,551
Noble	3,226	48.34%	3,441	51.56%	7	0.10%	-215	-3.22%	6,674
Nowata	3,615	51.20%	3,406	48.24%	39	0.55%	209	2.96%	7,060
Okfuskee	4,574	60.19%	3,001	39.49%	24	0.32%	1,573	20.70%	7,599
Oklahoma	53,649	59.86%	35,639	39.77%	329	0.37%	18,010	20.10%	89,617
Okmulgee	11,016	61.90%	6,696	37.63%	84	0.47%	4,320	24.28%	17,796
Osage	9,019	58.26%	6,419	41.46%	43	0.28%	2,600	16.79%	15,481
Ottawa	7,873	57.69%	5,738	42.05%	35	0.26%	2,135	15.65%	13,646
Pawnee	3,435	46.02%	3,991	53.47%	38	0.51%	-556	-7.45%	7,464
Payne	7,704	52.99%	6,772	46.58%	63	0.43%	932	6.41%	14,539
Pittsburg	10,169	69.29%	4,484	30.55%	23	0.16%	5,685	38.74%	14,676
Pontotoc	9,310	72.77%	3,449	26.96%	35	0.27%	5,861	45.81%	12,794
Pottawatomie	12,058	63.76%	6,776	35.83%	78	0.41%	5,282	27.93%	18,912
Pushmataha	3,952	69.70%	1,709	30.14%	9	0.16%	2,243	39.56%	5,670
Roger Mills	2,580	62.83%	1,504	36.63%	22	0.54%	1,076	26.21%	4,106
Rogers	4,028	49.49%	4,086	50.20%	25	0.31%	-58	-0.71%	8,139
Seminole	11,167	61.75%	6,880	38.05%	36	0.20%	4,287	23.71%	18,083
Sequoyah	4,469	53.97%	3,803	45.92%	9	0.11%	666	8.04%	8,281
Stephens	6,149	67.04%	2,989	32.59%	34	0.37%	3,160	34.45%	9,172
Texas	2,831	59.26%	1,918	40.15%	28	0.59%	913	19.11%	4,777
Tillman	4,920	75.60%	1,564	24.03%	24	0.37%	3,356	51.57%	6,508
Tulsa	33,098	44.99%	40,342	54.83%	135	0.18%	-7,244	-9.85%	73,575
Wagoner	2,946	38.67%	4,647	61.00%	25	0.33%	-1,701	-22.33%	7,618
Washington	6,289	45.85%	7,387	53.86%	40	0.29%	-1,098	-8.01%	13,716
Washita	4,256	58.74%	2,978	41.10%	11	0.15%	1,278	17.64%	7,245
Woods	3,506	50.04%	3,440	49.09%	61	0.87%	66	0.94%	7,007
Woodward	2,806	44.95%	3,403	54.51%	34	0.54%	-597	-9.56%	6,243
Totals	474,313	57.41%	348,912	42.23%	3,027	0.37%	125,401	15.18%	826,252

==== Counties that flipped Democratic to Republican ====
- Adair
- Beaver
- Blaine
- Alfalfa
- Dewey
- Harper
- Ellis
- Garfield
- Lincoln
- Logan
- Kingfisher
- Noble
- Pawnee
- Rogers
- Tulsa
- Washington
- Wagoner
- Woodward

== See also ==
- United States presidential elections in Oklahoma
