= Harmon County, Oklahoma =

County in Oklahoma, United States

- County
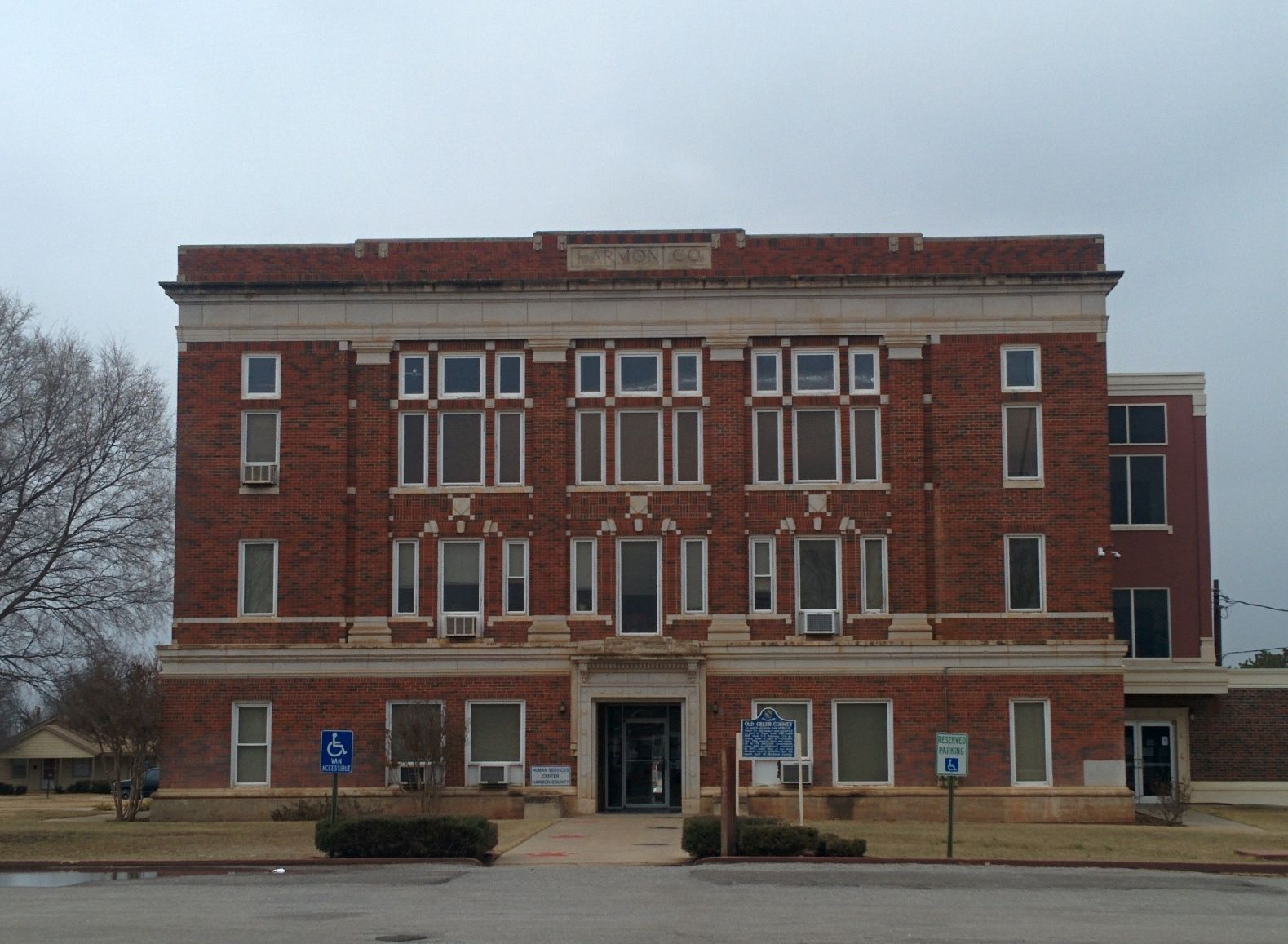
- Harmon County Courthouse in January 2015

- Location within the U.S. state of Oklahoma
- Coordinates: 34°44′N 99°50′W
- Country: United States
- State: Oklahoma
- Founded: 1909
- Seat: Hollis
- Largest city: Hollis

Area
  - Total: 539 sq mi (1,400 km^{2})
  - Land: 537 sq mi (1,390 km^{2})
  - Water: 1.5 sq mi (3.9 km^{2}) 0.3%

Population (2020)
  - Total: 2,488
  - Estimate (2025): 2,327 ▼
  - Density: 4.63/sq mi (1.79/km^{2})
- Time zone: UTC−6 (Central)
  - Summer (DST): UTC−5 (CDT)
- Congressional district: 3rd

Harmon County is a county in the southwest corner of the U.S. state of Oklahoma. As of the 2020 Census, the population was 2,488, making it the second-least populous county in Oklahoma, behind only Cimarron County. It has lost population in every census since 1930. The county seat is Hollis.

== History ==
Following an election on May 22, 1909, Harmon County was created by proclamation of Governor Lee Cruce on June 2. Carved from adjacent Greer County, the new county was named in honor of Judson Harmon, who was Governor of Ohio at the time. The area now covered by Harmon County had been a part of Greer County, Texas until the U. S. Supreme Court awarded it to Oklahoma Territory in 1896.

Another election held September 1, 1909, confirmed Hollis as the county seat. There were two other contestants: the towns of Harmon and Rosser. County offices operated in rented space until a courthouse was built in Hollis in 1926. In 1930, the U.S. Supreme Court ruled that the boundary between Texas and Oklahoma was actually 3,800 feet (1,200 m) farther east than originally believed. It returned the disputed land to Texas, reducing the county's area to its present size.

A railroad built from Altus, Oklahoma to the Texas state line came to Hollis and Gould in 1910. The line was built by the Altus, Wichita Falls and Hollis Railway (later acquired by the Missouri, Kansas and Texas Railroad).

== Geography ==
According to the U.S. Census Bureau, the county has an area of 539 square miles (1,400 km^{2}), of which 537 square miles (1,390 km^{2}) is land and 1.5 square miles (3.9 km^{2}) (0.3%) is water. It lies in the Gypsum Hills physiographic region, and is drained by the Red River and its tributaries, the Salt and Elm forks of the Red River and Lebos and Turkey creeks.

=== Major highways ===
- U.S. Highway 62
- State Highway 5
- State Highway 9
- State Highway 30

=== Adjacent counties ===
- Beckham County (north)
- Greer County (northeast)
- Jackson County (southeast)
- Hardeman County, Texas (south)
- Childress County, Texas (west)
- Collingsworth County, Texas (northwest)

== Demographics ==
Historical population
| Census | Pop. | Note | %± |
|---|---|---|---|
| 1910 | 11,328 | | — |
| 1920 | 11,261 | | −0.6% |
| 1930 | 13,834 | | 22.8% |
| 1940 | 10,019 | | −27.6% |
| 1950 | 8,079 | | −19.4% |
| 1960 | 5,853 | | −27.6% |
| 1970 | 5,136 | | −12.3% |
| 1980 | 4,519 | | −12.0% |
| 1990 | 3,793 | | −16.1% |
| 2000 | 3,283 | | −13.4% |
| 2010 | 2,922 | | −11.0% |
| 2020 | 2,488 | | −14.9% |
| 2025 (est.) | 2,327 | ▼ | −6.5% |
U.S. Decennial Census; 1790-1960 1900-1990; 1990-2000 2010

=== 2020 census ===
As of the 2020 United States census, the county had a population of 2,488. Of the residents, 24.5% were under the age of 18 and 23.0% were 65 years of age or older; the median age was 42.2 years. For every 100 females there were 98.6 males, and for every 100 females age 18 and over there were 96.5 males.

The racial makeup of the county was 70.0% White, 6.6% Black or African American, 2.3% American Indian and Alaska Native, 0.4% Asian, 8.8% from some other race, and 11.9% from two or more races. Hispanic or Latino residents of any race comprised 29.7% of the population.

There were 1,002 households in the county, of which 33.4% had children under the age of 18 living with them and 24.7% had a female householder with no spouse or partner present. About 27.3% of all households were made up of individuals and 14.0% had someone living alone who was 65 years of age or older.

There were 1,345 housing units, of which 25.5% were vacant. Among occupied housing units, 74.7% were owner-occupied and 25.3% were renter-occupied. The homeowner vacancy rate was 1.0% and the rental vacancy rate was 25.3%.

=== 2000 census ===
As of the census of 2000, there were 3,283 people, 1,266 households, and 863 families residing in the county. The population density was six people per square mile (2.3 people/km^{2}). There were 1,647 housing units at an average density of three units per square mile (1.2/km^{2}). The racial makeup of the county was 72.65% White, 9.78% Black or African American, 1.13% Native American, 0.18% Asian, 0.03% Pacific Islander, 14.32% from other races, and 1.92% from two or more races. The population was 22.78% Hispanic or Latino.

There were 1,266 households, out of which 30.20% had children under the age of 18 living with them, 55.70% were married couples living together, 9.20% had a female householder with no husband present, and 31.80% were non-families. 29.00% of all households were made up of individuals, and 17.50% had someone living alone who was 65 years of age or older. The average household size was 2.47 and the average family size was 3.03.

In the county, the population was spread out, with 25.90% under the age of 18, 7.90% from 18 to 24, 24.10% from 25 to 44, 21.10% from 45 to 64, and 21.00% who were 65 years of age or older. The median age was 40 years. For every 100 females there were 94.10 males. For every 100 females age 18 and over, there were 89.80 males.

The median income for a household in the county was $22,365, and the median income for a family was $29,063. Males had a median income of $21,530 versus $16,658 for females. The per capita income for the county was $13,464. About 23.50% of families and 29.70% of the population were below the poverty line, including 38.20% of those under age 18 and 19.90% of those age 65 or over.

=== Population decline ===
Common to many rural counties in the Great Plains the population of Harmon county has declined steadily since 1930. Between 1930 and 2020, Harmon County lost a greater percentage of its population than any other Oklahoma county, from 13,834 in 1930 to 2,488 in 2020, a decrease of 82.1%.

== Politics ==
Voter Registration and Party Enrollment as of 2024
| Party | Number of Voters | Percentage |
|---|---|---|
| Democratic | 484 | 36.30% |
| Republican | 657 | 49.40% |
| Others | 182 | 14.34% |
| Total | 1,332 | 100% |

United States presidential election results for Harmon County, Oklahoma
| Year | Republican | | Democratic | | Third party(ies) | |
| Year | No. | % | No. | % | No. | % |
|---|---|---|---|---|---|---|
| 1912 | 197 | 14.25% | 895 | 64.76% | 290 | 20.98% |
| 1916 | 147 | 9.84% | 1,091 | 73.03% | 256 | 17.14% |
| 1920 | 643 | 34.18% | 1,123 | 59.70% | 115 | 6.11% |
| 1924 | 339 | 23.28% | 1,049 | 72.05% | 68 | 4.67% |
| 1928 | 1,431 | 56.85% | 1,060 | 42.11% | 26 | 1.03% |
| 1932 | 189 | 5.85% | 3,042 | 94.15% | 0 | 0.00% |
| 1936 | 331 | 11.37% | 2,570 | 88.26% | 11 | 0.38% |
| 1940 | 731 | 24.04% | 2,292 | 75.37% | 18 | 0.59% |
| 1944 | 503 | 20.56% | 1,933 | 79.03% | 10 | 0.41% |
| 1948 | 266 | 10.21% | 2,340 | 89.79% | 0 | 0.00% |
| 1952 | 1,057 | 35.70% | 1,904 | 64.30% | 0 | 0.00% |
| 1956 | 837 | 32.44% | 1,743 | 67.56% | 0 | 0.00% |
| 1960 | 1,142 | 47.44% | 1,265 | 52.56% | 0 | 0.00% |
| 1964 | 602 | 26.55% | 1,665 | 73.45% | 0 | 0.00% |
| 1968 | 644 | 30.04% | 1,097 | 51.17% | 403 | 18.80% |
| 1972 | 1,319 | 68.38% | 568 | 29.45% | 42 | 2.18% |
| 1976 | 666 | 32.57% | 1,371 | 67.04% | 8 | 0.39% |
| 1980 | 676 | 40.48% | 961 | 57.54% | 33 | 1.98% |
| 1984 | 1,009 | 55.90% | 785 | 43.49% | 11 | 0.61% |
| 1988 | 611 | 40.63% | 890 | 59.18% | 3 | 0.20% |
| 1992 | 496 | 30.79% | 783 | 48.60% | 332 | 20.61% |
| 1996 | 448 | 33.76% | 729 | 54.94% | 150 | 11.30% |
| 2000 | 692 | 57.43% | 507 | 42.07% | 6 | 0.50% |
| 2004 | 838 | 70.30% | 354 | 29.70% | 0 | 0.00% |
| 2008 | 757 | 69.45% | 333 | 30.55% | 0 | 0.00% |
| 2012 | 659 | 71.40% | 264 | 28.60% | 0 | 0.00% |
| 2016 | 715 | 73.18% | 225 | 23.03% | 37 | 3.79% |
| 2020 | 747 | 80.06% | 177 | 18.97% | 9 | 0.96% |
| 2024 | 709 | 80.39% | 165 | 18.71% | 8 | 0.91% |

== Economy ==
Agriculture has been the main component of the county economy. Cotton, wheat and sorghum have been the principal crops. By 1930, farmers had sizable holdings of cattle, poultry, horses, mules, swine, sheep and goats.

== Communities ==
=== City ===
- Hollis (county seat)

=== Town ===
- Gould

=== Unincorporated communities ===
- Arnett
- McQueen
- Vinson

== See also ==
- National Register of Historic Places listings in Harmon County, Oklahoma
