= 1944 United States presidential election in Oklahoma =

- November 7, 1944

All 10 Oklahoma votes to the Electoral College

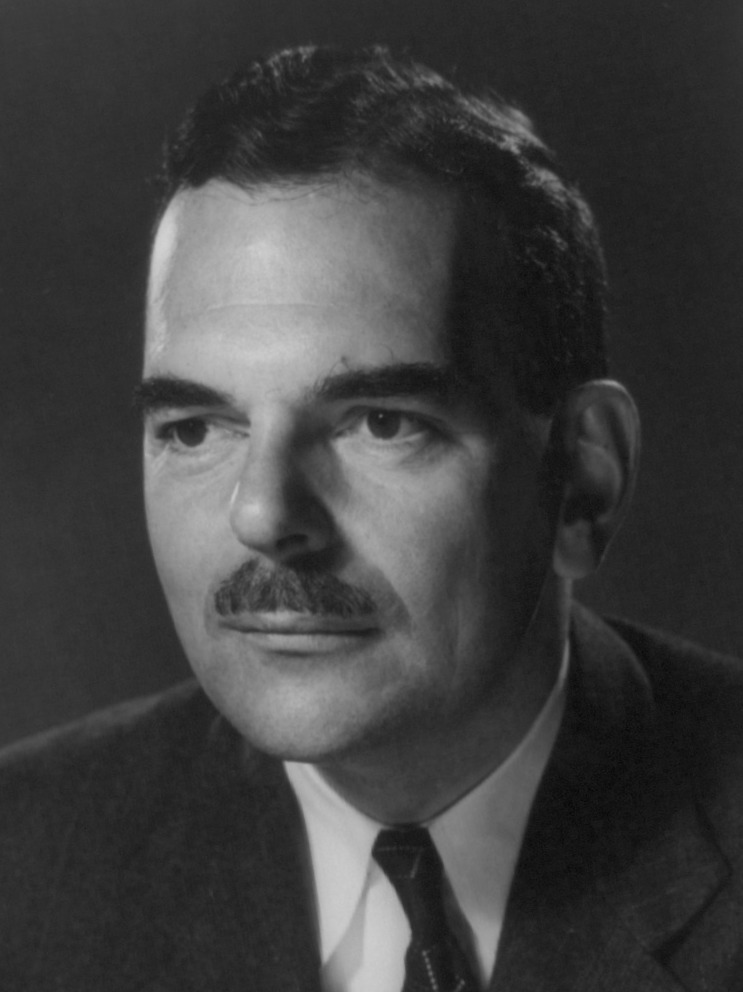
Nominee	Franklin D. Roosevelt	Thomas E. Dewey
Party	Democratic	Republican
Home state	New York	New York
Running mate	Harry S. Truman	John W. Bricker
Electoral vote	10	0
Popular vote	401,549	319,424
Percentage	55.57%	44.20%
County results
Roosevelt
40–50%
50–60%
60–70%
70–80%
80–90%
Dewey
50–60%
60–70%
70–80%
President before election
Franklin D. Roosevelt
Democratic
Elected President
Franklin D. Roosevelt
Democratic

The 1944 United States presidential election in Oklahoma took place on November 7, 1944, as part of the 1944 United States presidential election. Voters chose ten representatives, or electors, to the Electoral College, who voted for president and vice president.

Oklahoma was won by incumbent President Franklin D. Roosevelt (D–New York), running with Senator Harry S. Truman, with 55.57% of the popular vote, against Governor Thomas E. Dewey (R–New York), running with Governor John Bricker, with 44.20% of the popular vote.

== Results ==
1944 United States presidential election in Oklahoma
Party	Candidate	Votes	%
Democratic	Franklin D. Roosevelt (inc.)	401,549	55.57%
Republican	Thomas E. Dewey	319,424	44.20%
Socialist	Norman Thomas	1,663	0.23%
Total votes		722,636	100%

=== Results by county ===
County	Franklin Delano Roosevelt Democratic		Thomas Edmund Dewey Republican		Norman Mattoon Thomas Socialist		Margin		Total votes cast
County	#	%	#	%	#	%	#	%	Total votes cast
Adair	2,760	49.60%	2,792	50.18%	12	0.22%	-32	-0.58%	5,564
Alfalfa	1,716	33.11%	3,434	66.27%	32	0.62%	-1,718	-33.15%	5,182
Atoka	2,172	58.81%	1,515	41.02%	6	0.16%	657	17.79%	3,693
Beaver	1,355	41.12%	1,913	58.06%	27	0.82%	-558	-16.93%	3,295
Beckham	3,608	63.78%	2,034	35.96%	15	0.27%	1,574	27.82%	5,657
Blaine	2,097	37.51%	3,480	62.24%	14	0.25%	-1,383	-24.74%	5,591
Bryan	7,180	80.91%	1,677	18.90%	17	0.19%	5,503	62.01%	8,874
Caddo	6,850	55.23%	5,529	44.58%	24	0.19%	1,321	10.65%	12,403
Canadian	4,800	50.57%	4,674	49.24%	18	0.19%	126	1.33%	9,492
Carter	9,184	78.81%	2,446	20.99%	24	0.21%	6,738	57.82%	11,654
Cherokee	3,415	50.50%	3,336	49.33%	12	0.18%	79	1.17%	6,763
Choctaw	4,358	75.46%	1,404	24.31%	13	0.23%	2,954	51.15%	5,775
Cimarron	746	47.25%	822	52.06%	11	0.70%	-76	-4.81%	1,579
Cleveland	5,240	58.86%	3,642	40.91%	21	0.24%	1,598	17.95%	8,903
Coal	1,959	71.92%	760	27.90%	5	0.18%	1,199	44.02%	2,724
Comanche	7,342	63.96%	4,109	35.80%	28	0.24%	3,233	28.16%	11,479
Cotton	2,711	67.88%	1,266	31.70%	17	0.43%	1,445	36.18%	3,994
Craig	3,363	51.86%	3,111	47.97%	11	0.17%	252	3.89%	6,485
Creek	8,342	52.36%	7,549	47.38%	41	0.26%	793	4.98%	15,932
Custer	3,928	53.79%	3,349	45.86%	25	0.34%	579	7.93%	7,302
Delaware	2,373	46.29%	2,660	51.89%	93	1.81%	-287	-5.60%	5,126
Dewey	1,808	45.35%	2,166	54.33%	13	0.33%	-358	-8.98%	3,987
Ellis	1,104	36.18%	1,939	63.55%	8	0.26%	-835	-27.37%	3,051
Garfield	7,879	41.13%	11,211	58.53%	65	0.34%	-3,332	-17.39%	19,155
Garvin	5,328	71.80%	2,086	28.11%	7	0.09%	3,242	43.69%	7,421
Grady	7,689	65.28%	4,069	34.55%	20	0.17%	3,620	30.74%	11,778
Grant	2,045	40.26%	3,021	59.48%	13	0.26%	-976	-19.22%	5,079
Greer	2,984	73.43%	1,075	26.45%	5	0.12%	1,909	46.97%	4,064
Harmon	1,933	79.03%	503	20.56%	10	0.41%	1,430	58.46%	2,446
Harper	1,056	42.70%	1,394	56.37%	23	0.93%	-338	-13.67%	2,473
Haskell	2,924	58.00%	2,102	41.70%	15	0.30%	822	16.31%	5,041
Hughes	5,009	66.73%	2,484	33.09%	13	0.17%	2,525	33.64%	7,506
Jackson	4,866	78.59%	1,313	21.20%	13	0.21%	3,553	57.38%	6,192
Jefferson	2,948	74.88%	974	24.74%	15	0.38%	1,974	50.14%	3,937
Johnston	2,339	71.35%	925	28.22%	14	0.43%	1,414	43.14%	3,278
Kay	8,656	47.45%	9,498	52.07%	88	0.48%	-842	-4.62%	18,242
Kingfisher	2,175	38.78%	3,417	60.92%	17	0.30%	-1,242	-22.14%	5,609
Kiowa	4,175	66.48%	2,081	33.14%	24	0.38%	2,094	33.34%	6,280
Latimer	1,948	59.85%	1,296	39.82%	11	0.34%	652	20.03%	3,255
Le Flore	5,660	60.54%	3,667	39.22%	22	0.24%	1,993	21.32%	9,349
Lincoln	3,910	44.74%	4,801	54.94%	28	0.32%	-891	-10.20%	8,739
Logan	3,795	45.09%	4,586	54.48%	36	0.43%	-791	-9.40%	8,417
Love	1,955	81.29%	446	18.54%	4	0.17%	1,509	62.74%	2,405
Major	965	24.09%	3,019	75.38%	21	0.52%	-2,054	-51.29%	4,005
Marshall	2,261	74.77%	752	24.87%	11	0.36%	1,509	49.90%	3,024
Mayes	3,830	49.93%	3,822	49.82%	19	0.25%	8	0.10%	7,671
McClain	3,301	68.76%	1,492	31.08%	8	0.17%	1,809	37.68%	4,801
McCurtain	5,322	78.83%	1,419	21.02%	10	0.15%	3,903	57.81%	6,751
McIntosh	3,190	55.28%	2,569	44.52%	12	0.21%	621	10.76%	5,771
Murray	2,602	71.96%	1,005	27.79%	9	0.25%	1,597	44.16%	3,616
Muskogee	11,679	58.42%	8,280	41.42%	31	0.16%	3,399	17.00%	19,990
Noble	2,300	42.81%	3,060	56.95%	13	0.24%	-760	-14.14%	5,373
Nowata	2,581	48.46%	2,730	51.26%	15	0.28%	-149	-2.80%	5,326
Okfuskee	3,291	60.09%	2,177	39.75%	9	0.16%	1,114	20.34%	5,477
Oklahoma	57,812	57.59%	42,464	42.30%	116	0.12%	15,348	15.29%	100,392
Okmulgee	9,737	64.09%	5,430	35.74%	25	0.16%	4,307	28.35%	15,192
Osage	6,846	55.17%	5,557	44.78%	7	0.06%	1,289	10.39%	12,410
Ottawa	5,876	53.69%	5,056	46.19%	13	0.12%	820	7.49%	10,945
Pawnee	2,460	42.52%	3,310	57.21%	16	0.28%	-850	-14.69%	5,786
Payne	5,624	48.06%	6,048	51.68%	30	0.26%	-424	-3.62%	11,702
Pittsburg	8,535	67.60%	4,068	32.22%	23	0.18%	4,467	35.38%	12,626
Pontotoc	6,552	68.73%	2,960	31.05%	21	0.22%	3,592	37.68%	9,533
Pottawatomie	9,130	58.31%	6,486	41.42%	43	0.27%	2,644	16.88%	15,659
Pushmataha	2,848	70.50%	1,181	29.23%	11	0.27%	1,667	41.26%	4,040
Roger Mills	2,015	63.44%	1,148	36.15%	13	0.41%	867	27.30%	3,176
Rogers	3,209	46.13%	3,739	53.75%	8	0.12%	-530	-7.62%	6,956
Seminole	7,116	60.86%	4,560	39.00%	16	0.14%	2,556	21.86%	11,692
Sequoyah	3,571	55.18%	2,893	44.70%	8	0.12%	678	10.48%	6,472
Stephens	6,189	68.97%	2,766	30.82%	19	0.21%	3,423	38.14%	8,974
Texas	2,119	54.75%	1,731	44.73%	20	0.52%	388	10.03%	3,870
Tillman	3,902	72.13%	1,496	27.65%	12	0.22%	2,406	44.47%	5,410
Tulsa	33,436	43.89%	42,663	56.00%	89	0.12%	-9,227	-12.11%	76,188
Wagoner	2,373	40.58%	3,467	59.29%	8	0.14%	-1,094	-18.71%	5,848
Washington	5,090	43.72%	6,533	56.12%	18	0.15%	-1,443	-12.40%	11,641
Washita	3,524	56.40%	2,706	43.31%	18	0.29%	818	13.09%	6,248
Woods	2,426	42.75%	3,226	56.85%	23	0.41%	-800	-14.10%	5,675
Woodward	2,152	41.19%	3,055	58.47%	18	0.34%	-903	-17.28%	5,225
Totals	401,549	55.57%	319,424	44.20%	1,663	0.23%	82,125	11.36%	722,636

==== Counties that flipped Republican to Democratic ====
- Cherokee

==== Counties that flipped Democratic to Republican ====
- Delaware
- Cimarron
- Kay
- Nowata
- Payne
- Woods

== See also ==
- United States presidential elections in Oklahoma
