= 2024 United States presidential election in Oklahoma =

- November 5, 2024
- Turnout: 64.42% (▼4.92 pp)

Nominee	Donald Trump	Kamala Harris
Party	Republican	Democratic
Home state	Florida	California
Running mate	JD Vance	Tim Walz
Electoral vote	7	0
Popular vote	1,036,213	499,599
Percentage	66.16%	31.90%

Trump
40–50%
50–60%
60–70%
70–80%
80–90%
90–100%
Harris
40–50%
50–60%
60–70%
70–80%
80–90%
90–100%
Tie/No data
President before election
Joe Biden
Democratic
Elected President
Donald Trump
Republican

The 2024 United States presidential election in Oklahoma took place on Tuesday, November 5, 2024, as part of the 2024 United States elections in which all 50 states plus the District of Columbia participated. Oklahoma voters chose electors to represent them in the Electoral College via a popular vote. The state of Oklahoma has seven electoral votes in the Electoral College, following reapportionment due to the 2020 United States census in which the state neither gained nor lost a seat.

Republican Donald Trump easily kept the state in the GOP column in the past two election cycles, with a 36.4% margin of victory in 2016 and 33.1% four years later. Oklahoma was widely-expected to go for Trump a third time in 2024, and Trump ultimately carried the state by 34.26%, winning every county.

Oklahoma was Trump's fifth strongest state in the nation, behind North Dakota, Idaho, West Virginia, and Wyoming, in order from weakest to strongest. Despite this, the state had one of the smallest swings of any state, shifting rightward by just 1.2%, with many counties in the northwest of the state shifting slightly leftward.

The Oklahoma State Election Board approved Independent candidate Robert F. Kennedy Jr. to officially appear on the ballot in the state on May 9. Although he withdrew from the race, and subsequently endorsed Trump's candidacy, his name remained on the ballot.

== Primary elections ==
=== Democratic primary ===
The Oklahoma Democratic primary was held on Super Tuesday, March 5, 2024.

2024 Oklahoma Democratic pres. primary
Candidate	Votes	%	Delegates
Joe Biden (incumbent)	66,882	72.98	36
Marianne Williamson	8,356	9.12	0
Dean Phillips	8,182	8.93	0
Stephen Lyons	4,441	4.85	0
Cenk Uygur	1,974	2.15	0
Armando Perez-Serrato	1,809	1.97	0
Total	91,644	100%	36

=== Republican primary ===
The Oklahoma Republican primary was held on Super Tuesday, March 5, 2024.

Oklahoma Republican primary, March 5, 2024
Candidate	Votes	Percentage	Actual delegate count		
Candidate	Votes	Percentage	Bound	Unbound	Total
Donald Trump	254,928	81.83%	43		43
Nikki Haley	49,406	15.86%			
Ron DeSantis (withdrawn)	3,946	1.27%			
Chris Christie (withdrawn)	1,095	0.35%			
Vivek Ramaswamy (withdrawn)	1,022	0.33%			
Asa Hutchinson (withdrawn)	431	0.14%			
David Stuckenberg	397	0.13%			
Ryan Binkley (withdrawn)	303	0.10%			
Total:	311,528	100.00%	43		43

=== Libertarian primary ===
2024 Libertarian primary results

The Oklahoma Libertarian primary was held on Super Tuesday, March 5, 2024. Jacob Hornberger and Chase Oliver were qualified by petition for placement on the ballot. This is the first presidential preference primary for any alternative party in the state.

Oliver and Hornberger participated in a forum at Rose State College in Midwest City, on February 7, 2024.

Candidate	Votes	Percentage			
Candidate	Votes	Percentage	Chase Oliver	569	61.25%
Jacob Hornberger	360	38.75%			
Total:	929	100%			

== General election ==
=== Candidates ===
The following presidential candidates received ballot access in Oklahoma for the 2024 Presidential Election:

- Kamala Harris, Democratic Party
- Donald Trump, Republican Party
- Chase Oliver, Libertarian Party
- Chris Garrity, Independent
- Robert F. Kennedy Jr., Independent (withdrawn)

=== Predictions ===
Source	Ranking	As of
Cook Political Report	Solid R	December 19, 2023
Inside Elections	Solid R	April 26, 2023
Sabato's Crystal Ball	Safe R	June 29, 2023
Decision Desk HQ/The Hill	Safe R	December 14, 2023
CNalysis	Solid R	December 30, 2023
CNN	Solid R	January 14, 2024
The Economist	Safe R	June 12, 2024
538	Solid R	June 11, 2024
RCP	Solid R	June 26, 2024
NBC News	Safe R	October 6, 2024

=== Polling ===
Donald Trump vs. Kamala Harris

Poll source	Date(s) administered	Sample size (Note: Key: A – all adults RV – registered voters LV – likely voters V – unclear)	Margin of error	Donald Trump Republican	Kamala Harris Democratic	Other / Undecided
ActiVote	October 3–29, 2024	400 (LV)	± 4.9%	67%	33%	–
ActiVote	September 13 – October 19, 2024	400 (LV)	± 4.9%	66%	34%	–
SoonerPoll	August 24–31, 2024	323 (LV)	± 5.5%	56%	40%	4%

Hypothetical polling with Donald Trump and Joe Biden

Donald Trump vs. Joe Biden

Poll source	Date(s) administered	Sample size	Margin of error	Donald Trump Republican	Joe Biden Democratic	Other / Undecided
John Zogby Strategies (Note: Poll conducted for Kennedy's campaign)	April 13–21, 2024	391 (LV)	–	53%	40%	7%
Cygnal (R)	April 11–12, 2024	615 (LV)	± 3.9%	61%	30%	9%
Emerson College	October 1–3, 2023	447 (RV)	± 4.6%	55%	27%	18%
Emerson College	October 25–28, 2022	1,000 (LV)	± 3.0%	59%	30%	11%
SoonerPoll	October 4–6, 2022	301 (LV)	± 5.7%	53%	41%	6%
Echelon Insights (Note: Poll sponsored by NetChoice)	August 31 – September 7, 2022	522 (LV)	± 6.3%	63%	30%	7%

Donald Trump vs. Joe Biden vs. Robert F. Kennedy Jr. vs. Cornel West vs. Jill Stein

Poll source	Date(s) administered	Sample size	Margin of error	Donald Trump Republican	Joe Biden Democratic	Robert F. Kennedy Jr. Independent	Cornel West Independent	Jill Stein Green	Other / Undecided
Cygnal (R)	April 11–12, 2024	615 (LV)	± 3.83%	56%	24%	7%	2%	1%	10%

Hypothetical polling with other candidates

Donald Trump vs. Robert F. Kennedy Jr.

Poll source	Date(s) administered	Sample size	Margin of error	Donald Trump Republican	Robert Kennedy Jr. Independent	Other / Undecided
John Zogby Strategies	April 13–21, 2024	391 (LV)	–	46%	43%	11%

Robert F. Kennedy Jr. vs. Joe Biden

Poll source	Date(s) administered	Sample size	Margin of error	Robert Kennedy Jr. Independent	Joe Biden Democratic	Other / Undecided
John Zogby Strategies	April 13–21, 2024	391 (LV)	–	50%	36%	14%

Ron DeSantis vs. Joe Biden

Poll source	Date(s) administered	Sample size	Margin of error	Ron DeSantis Republican	Joe Biden Democratic	Other / Undecided
Echelon Insights	August 31 – September 7, 2022	522 (LV)	± 6.3%	53%	28%	19%

=== Results ===
State House district results: Trump 40–50% 50–60% 60–70% 70–80% 80–90% / Harris 40–50% 50–60% 60–70% 70–80% 80–90%

2024 United States presidential election in Oklahoma
Party	Candidate	Votes	%	±%
Republican	Donald Trump; JD Vance	1,036,213	66.16%	+0.79%
Democratic	Kamala Harris; Tim Walz	499,599	31.90%	−0.39%
Independent	Robert F. Kennedy Jr. (withdrawn); Nicole Shanahan (withdrawn)	16,020	1.02%	N/A
Libertarian	Chase Oliver; Mike ter Maat	9,198	0.59%	−0.99%
Independent	Chris Garrity; Cody Ballard	5,143	0.33%	N/A
Total votes		1,566,173	100.00%	N/A

==== By county ====
County	Donald Trump Republican		Kamala Harris Democratic		Various candidates Other parties		Margin		Total
County	#	%	#	%	#	%	#	%	Total
Adair	5,860	80.76%	1,289	17.76%	107	1.47%	4,571	63.00%	7,256
Alfalfa	1,891	87.55%	236	10.93%	33	1.53%	1,655	76.62%	2,160
Atoka	4,832	85.34%	779	13.76%	51	0.90%	4,053	71.58%	5,662
Beaver	1,938	91.24%	158	7.44%	28	1.32%	1,780	83.80%	2,124
Beckham	6,474	84.32%	1,093	14.24%	111	1.45%	5,381	70.08%	7,678
Blaine	3,054	80.67%	671	17.72%	61	1.61%	2,383	62.95%	3,786
Bryan	13,999	78.59%	3,569	20.04%	244	1.37%	10,430	58.55%	17,812
Caddo	6,886	72.51%	2,414	25.42%	196	2.06%	4,472	47.09%	9,496
Canadian	50,551	69.18%	21,038	28.79%	1,485	2.03%	29,513	40.39%	73,074
Carter	14,945	76.69%	4,277	21.95%	266	1.36%	10,668	54.74%	19,488
Cherokee	11,637	65.29%	5,826	32.69%	360	2.02%	5,811	32.60%	17,823
Choctaw	4,633	82.16%	944	16.74%	62	1.10%	3,689	65.42%	5,639
Cimarron	860	91.98%	66	7.06%	9	0.96%	794	84.92%	935
Cleveland	67,225	56.35%	49,432	41.44%	2,637	2.21%	17,793	14.91%	119,294
Coal	2,155	84.91%	345	13.59%	38	1.50%	1,810	71.32%	2,538
Comanche	20,823	60.74%	12,823	37.40%	638	1.86%	8,000	23.34%	34,284
Cotton	2,067	82.48%	392	15.64%	47	1.88%	1,675	66.84%	2,506
Craig	4,740	78.27%	1,212	20.01%	104	1.72%	3,528	58.26%	6,056
Creek	24,098	76.96%	6,643	21.22%	571	1.82%	17,455	55.74%	31,312
Custer	7,693	75.66%	2,279	22.41%	196	1.93%	5,414	53.25%	10,168
Delaware	14,407	79.56%	3,475	19.19%	226	1.25%	10,932	60.37%	18,108
Dewey	1,984	89.57%	209	9.44%	22	0.99%	1,775	80.13%	2,215
Ellis	1,585	87.47%	197	10.87%	30	1.66%	1,388	76.60%	1,812
Garfield	16,593	75.96%	4,849	22.20%	402	1.84%	11,744	53.76%	21,844
Garvin	9,063	82.46%	1,802	16.40%	126	1.15%	7,261	66.06%	10,991
Grady	20,378	80.60%	4,536	17.94%	369	1.46%	15,842	62.66%	25,283
Grant	1,794	84.42%	295	13.88%	36	1.69%	1,499	70.54%	2,125
Greer	1,511	82.30%	304	16.56%	21	1.14%	1,207	65.74%	1,836
Harmon	709	80.39%	165	18.71%	8	0.91%	544	61.68%	882
Harper	1,284	88.49%	147	10.13%	20	1.38%	1,137	78.36%	1,451
Haskell	4,156	84.20%	718	14.55%	62	1.26%	438	69.65%	4,936
Hughes	3,744	80.36%	831	17.84%	84	1.80%	2,913	62.52%	4,659
Jackson	6,295	78.17%	1,602	19.89%	156	1.94%	4,693	58.28%	8,053
Jefferson	2,020	85.05%	319	13.43%	36	1.52%	1,701	71.62%	2,375
Johnston	3,462	81.84%	684	16.17%	84	1.99%	2,778	65.67%	4,230
Kay	12,483	73.81%	4,136	24.45%	294	1.74%	8,347	49.36%	16,913
Kingfisher	5,745	85.06%	923	13.67%	86	1.27%	4,822	71.39%	6,754
Kiowa	2,569	78.37%	658	20.07%	51	1.56%	1,911	58.30%	3,278
Latimer	3,356	82.28%	681	16.70%	42	1.03%	2,675	65.58%	4,079
LeFlore	15,333	81.76%	3,184	16.98%	237	1.26%	12,149	64.78%	18,754
Lincoln	12,495	80.80%	2,712	17.54%	258	1.67%	9,783	63.26%	15,465
Logan	17,748	73.49%	5,901	24.44%	500	2.07%	11,847	49.05%	24,149
Love	3,510	82.39%	689	16.17%	61	1.43%	2,821	66.22%	4,260
McClain	17,005	79.47%	4,031	18.84%	361	1.69%	12,974	60.63%	21,397
McCurtain	9,485	83.87%	1,696	15.00%	128	1.13%	7,789	68.87%	11,309
McIntosh	6,387	75.68%	1,937	22.95%	115	1.36%	4,450	52.73%	8,439
Major	3,087	88.76%	327	9.40%	64	1.84%	2,760	79.36%	3,478
Marshall	5,348	81.17%	1,169	17.74%	72	1.09%	4,179	63.43%	6,589
Mayes	13,514	77.78%	3,529	20.31%	331	1.91%	9,985	57.47%	17,374
Murray	4,689	79.68%	1,080	18.35%	116	1.97%	3,609	61.33%	5,885
Muskogee	16,550	67.95%	7,400	30.38%	407	1.67%	9,150	37.57%	24,357
Noble	3,853	77.73%	1,009	20.36%	95	1.92%	2,844	57.37%	4,957
Nowata	3,774	82.75%	720	15.79%	67	1.47%	3,054	66.96%	4,561
Okfuskee	3,080	77.23%	854	21.41%	54	1.35%	2,226	55.82%	3,988
Oklahoma	143,618	49.71%	138,769	48.03%	6,536	2.26%	4,849	1.68%	288,923
Okmulgee	10,100	70.39%	3,979	27.73%	270	1.88%	6,121	42.66%	14,349
Osage	14,404	69.83%	5,867	28.44%	357	1.73%	8,537	41.39%	20,628
Ottawa	8,490	75.95%	2,511	22.46%	177	1.58%	5,979	53.49%	11,178
Pawnee	5,405	78.56%	1,355	19.69%	120	1.74%	4,050	58.87%	6,880
Payne	17,962	61.35%	10,560	36.07%	757	2.59%	7,402	25.28%	29,279
Pittsburg	13,841	78.77%	3,473	19.76%	258	1.47%	10,368	59.01%	17,572
Pontotoc	10,967	72.27%	3,895	25.67%	312	2.06%	7,072	46.60%	15,174
Pottawatomie	20,915	72.69%	7,266	25.25%	593	2.06%	13,649	47.44%	28,774
Pushmataha	4,025	85.60%	616	13.10%	61	1.30%	3,409	72.50%	4,702
Roger Mills	1,548	89.32%	160	9.23%	25	1.45%	1,388	80.09%	1,733
Rogers	35,942	76.63%	10,146	21.63%	814	1.74%	25,796	55.00%	46,902
Seminole	5,951	73.98%	1,951	24.25%	142	1.77%	4,000	49.73%	8,044
Sequoyah	12,491	80.16%	2,907	18.65%	185	1.19%	9,584	61.51%	15,583
Stephens	15,092	81.05%	3,236	17.38%	292	1.57%	11,856	63.67%	18,620
Texas	4,319	82.96%	793	15.23%	94	1.81%	3,526	67.73%	5,206
Tillman	2,006	79.19%	500	19.74%	27	1.07%	1,506	59.45%	2,533
Tulsa	145,241	56.53%	106,105	41.30%	5,593	2.18%	39,136	15.23%	256,939
Wagoner	28,487	73.99%	9,330	24.23%	684	1.78%	19,157	49.76%	38,501
Washington	16,836	72.65%	5,793	25.00%	545	2.35%	11,043	47.65%	23,174
Washita	4,030	86.63%	551	11.84%	71	1.53%	3,479	74.79%	4,652
Woods	2,955	81.23%	614	16.88%	69	1.90%	2,341	64.35%	3,638
Woodward	6,231	85.22%	967	13.22%	114	1.56%	5,264	72.00%	7,312
Totals	1,036,213	66.16%	499,599	31.90%	30,361	1.94%	536,614	34.26%	1,566,173

==== By congressional district ====
Trump won all five congressional districts.

District	Trump	Harris	Representative
1st	59.71%	38.18%	Kevin Hern
2nd	77.02%	21.40%	Josh Brecheen
3rd	71.47%	26.65%	Frank Lucas
4th	65.51%	32.58%	Tom Cole
5th	58.02%	39.78%	Stephanie Bice

== Analysis ==
A deeply red state entirely in the Bible Belt, Oklahoma has the longest Republican presidential voting streak of any Southern state, having not backed a Democratic presidential candidate since it was won by Lyndon B. Johnson of neighboring Texas in 1964. Since then, the state has only been contested by single digits in the nationwide victories of former Southern governors Jimmy Carter and Bill Clinton (the latter from neighboring Arkansas) in 1976, 1992, and 1996. In addition, Republican presidential candidates have consistently won every county in the state starting with Texan George W. Bush in 2004 — although Oklahoma County, home to the largest city and state capital Oklahoma City, was closely decided in 2020.

While dominating the Panhandle and Northwestern counties, Trump improved across the state, particularly the east with large Native American populations. He increased his vote-share in the only two plurality-Native counties in the state: Adair and Cherokee, both encompassed by the Cherokee Reservation, and the latter hosting the tribal capital in Tahlequah. Counties encompassed by the Cherokee, Muscogee, and Seminole reservations were all won by Trump by large margins, continuing 2020 trends. In addition, his 55% victory in Oklahoma's 2nd congressional district is the best for a presidential Republican; the historically Democratic region ("Little Dixie"), home to the Choctaw Reservation, has voted for Trump in all three of his election bids. His 41.4% victory in Osage County is the best for a presidential Republican since Nixon's 50.2% in 1972.

Although Trump easily won Oklahoma, the state had the third smallest rightward shift in the nation (after Utah and Washington state), shifting rightward by 1.18%. Much like in 2020, Oklahoma County was close, with Trump winning the county by less than 1.7%, though he did narrowly increase his margin in the county. Despite losing Tulsa County by 15%, Harris won 41.3% of the vote in the county, the highest since 1964.

== See also ==
- United States presidential elections in Oklahoma
- 2024 United States presidential election
- 2024 Democratic Party presidential primaries
- 2024 Republican Party presidential primaries
- 2024 United States elections

== Notes ==
Partisan clients
