= 2020 United States presidential election in Oklahoma =

- November 3, 2020
- Turnout: 69.34 ▲1.23 pp

Nominee	Donald Trump	Joe Biden
Party	Republican	Democratic
Home state	Florida	Delaware
Running mate	Mike Pence	Kamala Harris
Electoral vote	7	0
Popular vote	1,020,280	503,890
Percentage	65.37%	32.29%

Trump
40–50%
50–60%
60–70%
70–80%
80–90%
90–100%
Biden
40–50%
50–60%
60–70%
70–80%
80–90%
90–100%
President before election
Donald Trump
Republican
Elected President
Joe Biden
Democratic

The 2020 United States presidential election in Oklahoma was held on Tuesday, November 3, 2020, as part of the 2020 United States presidential election in which all 50 states plus the District of Columbia participated. Oklahoma voters chose electors to represent them in the Electoral College via a popular vote, pitting the Republican Party's nominee, incumbent President Donald Trump, and running mate Vice President Mike Pence against Democratic Party nominee, former Vice President Joe Biden, and his running mate California Senator Kamala Harris. Oklahoma has seven electoral votes in the Electoral College.

Trump easily carried Oklahoma on Election Day by a margin of 33.08%, down from 36.39 points in 2016. Oklahoma was one of two states where Trump won every county (though Oklahoma County was won by a plurality of votes, compared to the absolute majorities achieved across the state), the other being West Virginia. This also signaled the fifth consecutive election in which the Republican candidate carried every county in the state, including those counties encompassed by Native American reservations. In this election, Trump also became the first presidential candidate ever to win more than a million votes in Oklahoma. Biden, however, came within 3,326 votes of winning Oklahoma's most populous county Oklahoma County, and won more than 40% of the vote in Oklahoma's second-most populous county Tulsa. No Democratic presidential candidate has won Oklahoma County since Lyndon B. Johnson in his 1964 landslide, or Tulsa County since Franklin D. Roosevelt in his 1936 landslide. This is the first election since 2000 in which not every county voted in the majority for the Republican, as Oklahoma County was won by Republicans with a 49.21% plurality. However, these gains in urban Oklahoma were partly offset by continued falloff in southeast Oklahoma, where Biden even underperformed Hillary Clinton's performance four years earlier in most counties.

== Primary elections ==
The primary elections were held on Super Tuesday, March 3, 2020.

=== Republican primary ===
Donald Trump and Bill Weld were among the declared Republican candidates.

Trump won the state in a landslide victory against his five opponents.

2020 Oklahoma Republican presidential primary
Candidate	Popular vote		Delegates
Candidate	Count	Percentage	Delegates
Donald Trump (incumbent)	273,738	92.60%	43
Joe Walsh (withdrawn)	10,996	3.72%	0
Matthew Matern	3,810	1.29%	0
Bob Ely	3,294	1.11%	0
Rocky De La Fuente	2,466	0.83%	0
Zoltan Istvan	1,297	0.44%	0
Total	295,601	100%	43

=== Democratic primary ===
Bernie Sanders, Elizabeth Warren, and former Vice President Joe Biden were the major declared Democratic candidates.

Popular vote share by county Biden—<30% Biden—30–40% Biden—40–50%

2020 Oklahoma Democratic presidential primary
Candidate	Votes	%	Delegates
Joe Biden	117,633	38.66	21
Bernie Sanders	77,425	25.45	13
Michael Bloomberg	42,270	13.89	2
Elizabeth Warren	40,732	13.39	1
Amy Klobuchar (withdrawn) (Note: Candidate withdrew during absentee voting, shortly before the election.)	6,733	2.21	
Pete Buttigieg (withdrawn)	5,115	1.68	
Tulsi Gabbard	5,109	1.68	
Tom Steyer (withdrawn)	2,006	0.66	
Andrew Yang (withdrawn)	1,997	0.66	
Cory Booker (withdrawn)	1,530	0.50	
Michael Bennet (withdrawn)	1,273	0.42	
Marianne Williamson (withdrawn)	1,158	0.38	
Deval Patrick (withdrawn)	680	0.22	
Julian Castro (withdrawn)	620	0.20	
Total	304,281	100%	37

=== Libertarian nominee ===
- Jo Jorgensen, Psychology senior lecturer at Clemson University

=== Independent candidates ===
Three unaffiliated candidates filed to be on the Oklahoma presidential ballot, all by paying a $35,000 fee. Green Party candidate Howie Hawkins filed a lawsuit challenging the amount of the filing fee.

- Brock Pierce, cryptocurrency entrepreneur and former child actor
- Jade Simmons, concert artist, speaker, and author
- Kanye West, musician

=== Ballot order ===
Oklahoma determines ballot order by lot, with unaffiliated candidates listed below candidates of recognized parties. The drawing was held on July 16, with the resulting order for political parties being Republican, Libertarian, Democrat. The unaffiliated candidates for president were listed in this order: Jade Simmons, Kanye West, Brock Pierce.

== General election ==
=== Predictions ===
Source	Ranking	As of
The Cook Political Report	Safe R	September 10, 2020
Inside Elections	Safe R	September 4, 2020
Sabato's Crystal Ball	Safe R	July 14, 2020
Politico	Safe R	September 8, 2020
RCP	Safe R	August 3, 2020
Niskanen	Safe R	July 26, 2020
CNN	Safe R	August 3, 2020
The Economist	Safe R	September 2, 2020
CBS News	Likely R	August 16, 2020
270towin	Safe R	August 2, 2020
ABC News	Safe R	July 31, 2020
NPR	Likely R	August 3, 2020
NBC News	Safe R	August 6, 2020
538	Safe R	September 9, 2020

=== Polling ===
==== Graphical summary ====
Graph of opinion polls conducted. Trend lines represent local regressions.

==== Aggregate polls ====
Source of poll aggregation	Dates administered	Dates updated	Joe Biden Democratic	Donald Trump Republican	Other/ Undecided (Note: Calculated by taking the difference of 100% and all other candidates combined.)	Margin
270 to Win	October 17–21, 2020	November 3, 2020	38.5%	58.5%	3.0%	Trump +20.0
FiveThirtyEight	until November 2, 2020	November 3, 2020	36.2%	59.2%	4.6%	Trump +23.0
Average			37.4%	58.9%	3.7%	Trump +21.5

==== Polls ====
Poll source	Date(s) administered	Sample size (Note: Key: A – all adults RV – registered voters LV – likely voters V – unclear)	Margin of error	Donald Trump Republican	Joe Biden Democratic	Jo Jorgensen Libertarian	Other	Undecided
SurveyMonkey/Axios	Oct 20 – Nov 2, 2020	1,902 (LV)	± 3%	65% (Note: Overlapping sample with the previous SurveyMonkey/Axios poll, but more information available regarding sample size)	35%	–		
SurveyMonkey/Axios	Oct 1–28, 2020	3,191 (LV)	–	59%	40%	–	–	–
SoonerPoll/News 9/News on 6	Oct 15–20, 2020	5,466 (LV)	± 1.33%	59%	37%	1%	2% (Note: West (B) with 1%; Pierce (I) and Simmons (I) with less than 1%)	2%
SurveyMonkey/Axios	Sep 1–30, 2020	1,174 (LV)	–	63%	35%	–	–	2%
Amber Integrated	Sep 17–20, 2020	500 (LV)	± 4.38%	55%	33%	1%	5% (Note: Pierce (I), Simmons (I), West (B) and "refused" with 1%)	6%
SoonerPoll/News9	Sep 2–8, 2020	486 (LV)	± 4.45%	60%	35%	–	1%	4%
SoonerPoll	Aug 13–31, 2020	379 (LV)	± 5.03%	60%	35%	–	2% (Note: Would not vote with 2%)	4%
SurveyMonkey/Axios	Aug 1–31, 2020	1,009 (LV)	–	64%	35%	–	–	2%
SurveyMonkey/Axios	Jul 1–31, 2020	1,410 (LV)	–	64%	34%	–	–	4%
DFM Research/Abby Broyles for US Senate (Note: Poll sponsored by Broyles' campaign)	Jul 29–30, 2020	572 (LV)	± 4.1%	56%	36%	–	5% (Note: "Other candidate" with 5%)	3%
SurveyMonkey/Axios	Jun 8–30, 2020	591 (LV)	–	61%	37%	–	–	1%
Amber Integrated	Jun 3–4, 2020	500 (LV)	± 4.4%	55%	36%	–	4% (Note: "Neither" with 3%; "refused" with 1%)	5%
Amber Integrated	Mar 5–8, 2020	500 (LV)	± 4.4%	57%	33%	–	4%	5%
Cole Hargrave Snodgrass & Associates/OK Sooner	Feb 10–13, 2020	500 (RV)	± 4.3%	62%	34%	–	–	4%

Former candidates

Donald Trump vs. Bernie Sanders

Poll source	Date(s) administered	Sample size	Margin of error	Donald Trump (R)	Bernie Sanders (D)	Other	Undecided
Amber Integrated	Mar 5–8, 2020	500 (LV)	± 4.4 %	59%	30%	5%	5%
Cole Hargrave Snodgrass & Associates/OK Sooner	Feb 10–13, 2020	500 (RV)	± 4.3%	63%	34%	–	3%

Donald Trump vs. Pete Buttigieg

Poll source	Date(s) administered	Sample size	Margin of error	Donald Trump (R)	Pete Buttigieg (D)	Other	Undecided
Cole Hargrave Snodgrass & Associates/OK Sooner	Feb 10–13, 2020	500 (RV)	± 4.3%	61%	35%	–	3%

Donald Trump vs. Generic Democrat

Poll source	Date(s) administered	Sample size	Margin of error	Donald Trump (R)	Generic Democrat (D)	Independent	Undecided
Amber Integrated	Dec. 4-6, 2019	500 (RV)	4.38%	54%	27%	8%	10%

=== Results ===
2020 United States presidential election in Oklahoma
Party	Candidate	Votes	%	±%
Republican	Donald Trump Mike Pence	1,020,280	65.37%	+0.05%
Democratic	Joe Biden Kamala Harris	503,890	32.29%	+3.36%
Libertarian	Jo Jorgensen Spike Cohen	24,731	1.58%	−4.17%
Independent	Kanye West Michelle Tidball	5,597	0.36%	N/A
Independent	Jade Simmons Claudeliah Roze	3,654	0.23%	N/A
Independent	Brock Pierce Karla Ballard	2,547	0.16%	N/A
Total votes		1,560,699	100.00%	

==== By county ====
County	Donald Trump Republican		Joe Biden Democratic		Various candidates Other parties		Margin		Total
County	#	%	#	%	#	%	#	%	Total
Adair	5,585	78.57%	1,387	19.51%	136	1.92%	4,198	59.06%	7,108
Alfalfa	1,978	87.44%	232	10.26%	52	2.30%	1,746	77.18%	2,262
Atoka	4,557	84.56%	765	14.20%	67	1.24%	3,792	70.36%	5,389
Beaver	1,968	90.36%	190	8.72%	20	0.92%	1,778	81.64%	2,178
Beckham	6,767	85.14%	1,048	13.19%	133	1.67%	5,719	71.95%	7,948
Blaine	3,136	80.39%	688	17.64%	77	1.97%	2,448	62.75%	3,901
Bryan	12,344	77.27%	3,323	20.80%	309	1.93%	9,021	56.47%	15,976
Caddo	7,013	71.13%	2,670	27.08%	176	1.79%	4,343	44.05%	9,859
Canadian	43,550	70.31%	16,742	27.03%	1,648	2.66%	26,808	43.28%	61,940
Carter	14,699	75.46%	4,470	22.95%	310	1.59%	10,229	52.51%	19,479
Cherokee	11,223	63.36%	6,027	34.02%	464	2.62%	5,196	29.34%	17,714
Choctaw	4,698	80.56%	1,082	18.55%	52	0.89%	3,616	62.01%	5,832
Cimarron	970	92.03%	70	6.64%	14	1.43%	900	85.39%	1,054
Cleveland	66,677	55.67%	49,827	41.60%	3,274	2.73%	16,850	14.07%	119,778
Coal	2,091	82.84%	374	14.82%	59	2.34%	1,717	68.02%	2,524
Comanche	20,905	58.67%	13,747	38.58%	979	2.75%	7,158	20.09%	35,631
Cotton	2,117	82.31%	393	15.28%	62	2.41%	1,724	67.03%	2,572
Craig	4,686	77.69%	1,217	20.18%	129	2.13%	3,469	57.51%	6,032
Creek	23,294	76.36%	6,577	21.56%	634	2.08%	16,717	54.80%	30,505
Custer	8,060	75.39%	2,369	22.16%	262	2.45%	5,691	53.23%	10,691
Delaware	13,557	78.61%	3,472	20.13%	216	1.26%	10,085	58.48%	17,245
Dewey	2,124	90.04%	214	9.07%	21	0.89%	1,910	80.97%	2,359
Ellis	1,688	90.12%	162	8.65%	23	1.23%	1,526	81.47%	1,873
Garfield	16,970	75.66%	4,919	21.93%	541	2.41%	12,051	53.73%	22,430
Garvin	8,878	81.29%	1,865	17.08%	179	1.63%	7,013	64.21%	10,922
Grady	18,538	80.25%	4,144	17.94%	419	1.81%	14,394	62.31%	23,101
Grant	1,916	86.07%	280	12.58%	30	1.35%	1,636	73.49%	2,226
Greer	1,605	81.35%	328	16.62%	40	2.03%	1,277	64.73%	1,973
Harmon	747	80.06%	177	18.97%	9	0.97%	570	61.09%	933
Harper	1,327	89.24%	136	9.15%	24	1.61%	1,191	80.09%	1,487
Haskell	4,165	83.07%	783	15.62%	66	1.51%	3,382	67.45%	5,014
Hughes	3,875	79.78%	919	18.92%	63	1.30%	2,956	60.86%	4,857
Jackson	6,392	77.75%	1,646	20.02%	183	2.23%	4,746	57.73%	8,221
Jefferson	2,026	84.95%	319	13.38%	40	1.67%	1,707	71.57%	2,385
Johnston	3,441	80.95%	738	17.36%	72	1.69%	2,703	63.59%	4,251
Kay	12,834	74.40%	4,040	23.42%	375	2.18%	8,794	50.98%	17,249
Kingfisher	5,521	85.40%	854	13.21%	90	1.39%	4,667	72.19%	6,465
Kiowa	2,673	78.00%	699	20.40%	55	1.60%	1,974	57.60%	3,427
Latimer	3,437	80.89%	762	17.93%	50	1.18%	2,675	62.96%	4,249
LeFlore	15,213	80.90%	3,299	17.54%	293	1.56%	11,914	63.36%	18,805
Lincoln	12,013	80.69%	2,609	17.52%	266	1.79%	9,404	63.17%	14,888
Logan	15,608	72.35%	5,455	25.29%	511	2.36%	10,153	47.06%	21,574
Love	3,305	81.08%	711	17.44%	60	1.48%	2,594	63.64%	4,076
McClain	15,295	79.51%	3,582	18.62%	359	1.87%	11,713	60.89%	19,236
McCurtain	9,485	82.72%	1,858	16.20%	124	1.08%	7,627	66.52%	11,467
McIntosh	6,172	74.05%	2,031	24.37%	132	1.58%	4,141	49.68%	8,335
Major	3,084	88.95%	320	9.23%	63	1.82%	2,764	79.72%	3,467
Marshall	4,891	80.66%	1,100	18.14%	73	1.20%	3,791	62.52%	6,064
Mayes	12,749	76.68%	3,581	21.54%	296	1.78%	9,168	55.14%	16,626
Murray	4,612	78.25%	1,156	19.61%	126	2.14%	3,456	58.64%	5,894
Muskogee	16,526	65.89%	8,027	32.00%	528	2.11%	8,499	33.89%	25,081
Noble	3,821	77.38%	1,003	20.31%	114	2.31%	2,818	57.07%	4,938
Nowata	3,610	82.21%	712	16.21%	69	1.58%	2,898	66.00%	4,391
Okfuskee	3,058	75.73%	896	22.19%	84	2.08%	2,062	53.54%	4,038
Oklahoma	145,050	49.21%	141,724	48.08%	7,966	2.71%	3,326	1.13%	294,740
Okmulgee	9,668	67.55%	4,357	30.44%	288	2.01%	5,311	37.11%	14,313
Osage	14,121	68.76%	6,002	29.22%	415	2.02%	8,119	39.54%	20,538
Ottawa	8,545	74.71%	2,686	23.48%	207	1.81%	5,859	51.23%	11,438
Pawnee	5,267	77.62%	1,363	20.09%	156	2.29%	3,904	57.53%	6,786
Payne	17,813	60.09%	10,904	36.78%	926	3.13%	6,909	23.31%	29,643
Pittsburg	13,851	77.28%	3,768	21.02%	305	1.70%	10,083	56.26%	17,924
Pontotoc	10,805	70.53%	4,117	26.87%	398	2.60%	6,688	43.66%	15,320
Pottawatomie	20,240	71.81%	7,275	25.81%	670	2.38%	12,965	46.00%	28,185
Pushmataha	4,016	84.74%	668	14.10%	55	1.16%	3,348	70.64%	4,739
Roger Mills	1,629	88.82%	168	9.16%	37	2.02%	1,461	79.66%	1,834
Rogers	34,031	76.38%	9,589	21.52%	933	2.10%	24,442	54.86%	44,553
Seminole	6,011	72.10%	2,150	25.79%	176	2.11%	3,861	46.31%	8,337
Sequoyah	12,113	78.73%	3,035	19.73%	238	1.54%	9,078	59.00%	15,386
Stephens	15,560	81.65%	3,154	16.55%	343	1.80%	12,404	65.10%	19,057
Texas	4,505	81.60%	894	16.19%	122	2.21%	3,611	65.41%	5,521
Tillman	2,076	76.66%	597	22.05%	35	1.29%	1,479	54.61%	2,708
Tulsa	150,574	56.46%	108,996	40.87%	7,108	2.67%	41,578	15.59%	266,678
Wagoner	26,165	74.04%	8,464	23.95%	709	2.01%	17,701	50.09%	35,338
Washington	17,076	72.66%	5,790	24.64%	635	2.70%	11,286	48.02%	23,501
Washita	4,086	85.53%	598	12.52%	93	1.95%	3,488	73.01%	4,777
Woods	2,993	81.38%	591	16.07%	94	2.55%	2,402	65.31%	3,678
Woodward	6,611	84.92%	1,005	12.91%	169	2.17%	5,606	72.01%	7,785
Totals	1,020,280	65.37%	503,890	32.29%	36,529	2.34%	516,390	33.08%	1,560,699

==== By congressional district ====
Trump won all five congressional districts.

District	Trump	Biden	Representative
1st	60%	37%	Kevin Hern
2nd	76%	22%	Markwayne Mullin
3rd	75%	23%	Frank Lucas
4th	65%	32%	Tom Cole
5th	51%	46%	Kendra Horn (116th Congress)
5th	51%	46%	Stephanie Bice (117th Congress)

== Electors ==
- Republican Party electors

Ronda Vuillemont-Smith, Lonnie Lu Anderson, Chris Martin, Steve Fair, Linda Huggard, A. J. Ferate, Carolyn McLarty

- Libertarian Party electors

Erin Adams, Danny Chabino, Drew Cook, Kevin Hobbie, Rex Lawhorn, Jay Norton, Victoria Whitfield

- Democratic Party electors

Judy Eason McIntyre, Eric Proctor, Jeff Berrong, Christine Byrd, Demetrios Bereolos, Pamela Iron, Shevonda Steward

- Electors for Jade Simmons

Shanda Carter, Terrence Stephens, Hope Stephens, Elizabeth Stephens, Dakota Hooks, Phalanda Boyd, Quincy Boyd

- Electors for Kanye West

April Anderson, Craig Alan Weygandt, Will Flanagan, Tom Krup, Megan Krup, Gretchen Schrupp, David Schrupp

- Electors for Brock Pierce

Robert Murphy, Susan Darlene Murphy, Richard Prawdzienski, Jessy Artman, David Selinger, Shane Wayne Howell, Angela McCaslin

== Analysis ==
Oklahoma, a majority-White, mainly-rural state sandwiched between the South and the Midwest, has long been a Republican stronghold at the presidential level, although Democrats did well in state-level elections until the 2000s. Four of five congressional seats are considered non-competitive for Democrats, and it has not voted for a Democratic presidential candidate since Lyndon B. Johnson carried it in 1964, against the backdrop of his nationwide landslide victory. Oklahoma was last competitive at the presidential level in 1996.

Despite Trump's win in the state, Biden came less than 1 percentage point of flipping the rapidly-urbanizing Oklahoma County, which hosts the state capital, while he also reduced Trump's margin of victory in Tulsa County. Meanwhile, Trump carried the state's only Hispanic-majority county of Texas, located in the Oklahoma panhandle. He also held onto the only two plurality-Native American counties in the state: Adair and Cherokee, both encompassed by the Cherokee Reservation, and the latter hosting the tribal capital in Tahlequah. Trump also exhibited considerable strength in the historically Democratic region known as "Little Dixie," carrying Oklahoma's 2nd congressional district by 54%. The counties encompassed by the Cherokee, Choctaw, Chickasaw, Muscogee, Seminole, Osage, and Pawnee reservations were all captured by Trump by large margins.

Per exit polls by the Associated Press, Trump's strength in Oklahoma came from whites, with 71% support; he narrowly won 50% of the state's non-white vote (most notably from the state's large Native American population). Oklahoma, often termed the "Buckle of the Bible Belt", is a very religious state, with Trump capturing the Protestant vote by 78%.

=== Exit polls ===
2020 presidential election in Oklahoma by demographic subgroup (New York Times)
Demographic subgroup	Biden	Trump	% of total vote
Total vote	32.29	65.37	100
Ideology
Liberals	73	27	21
Moderates	46	52	30
Conservatives	7	91	49
Party
Democrats	90	9	29
Republicans	7	92	68
Gender
Men	26	72	46
Women	37	62	53
Race/ethnicity
White	28	71	78
Non-white	49	50	22
Age
18–29 years old	55	43	10
30–44 years old	36	62	20
45–64 years old	29	70	37
65 and older	28	71	33
Sexual orientation
LGBT	–	–	10
Not LGBT	25	75	90
Education
High school or less	29	70	29
Some college, or associate degree	36	62	36
College graduate	20	69	22
Postgraduate degree	–	–	13
Area type
Urban	43	55	17
Suburban	39	59	37
Small town	25	73	20
Rural	21	78	25

== Notes ==
Partisan clients

== See also ==
- United States presidential elections in Oklahoma
- Presidency of Joe Biden
- 2020 United States presidential election
- 2020 Democratic Party presidential primaries
- 2020 Libertarian Party presidential primaries
- 2020 Republican Party presidential primaries
- 2020 United States elections
