= Gould, Oklahoma =

- Town
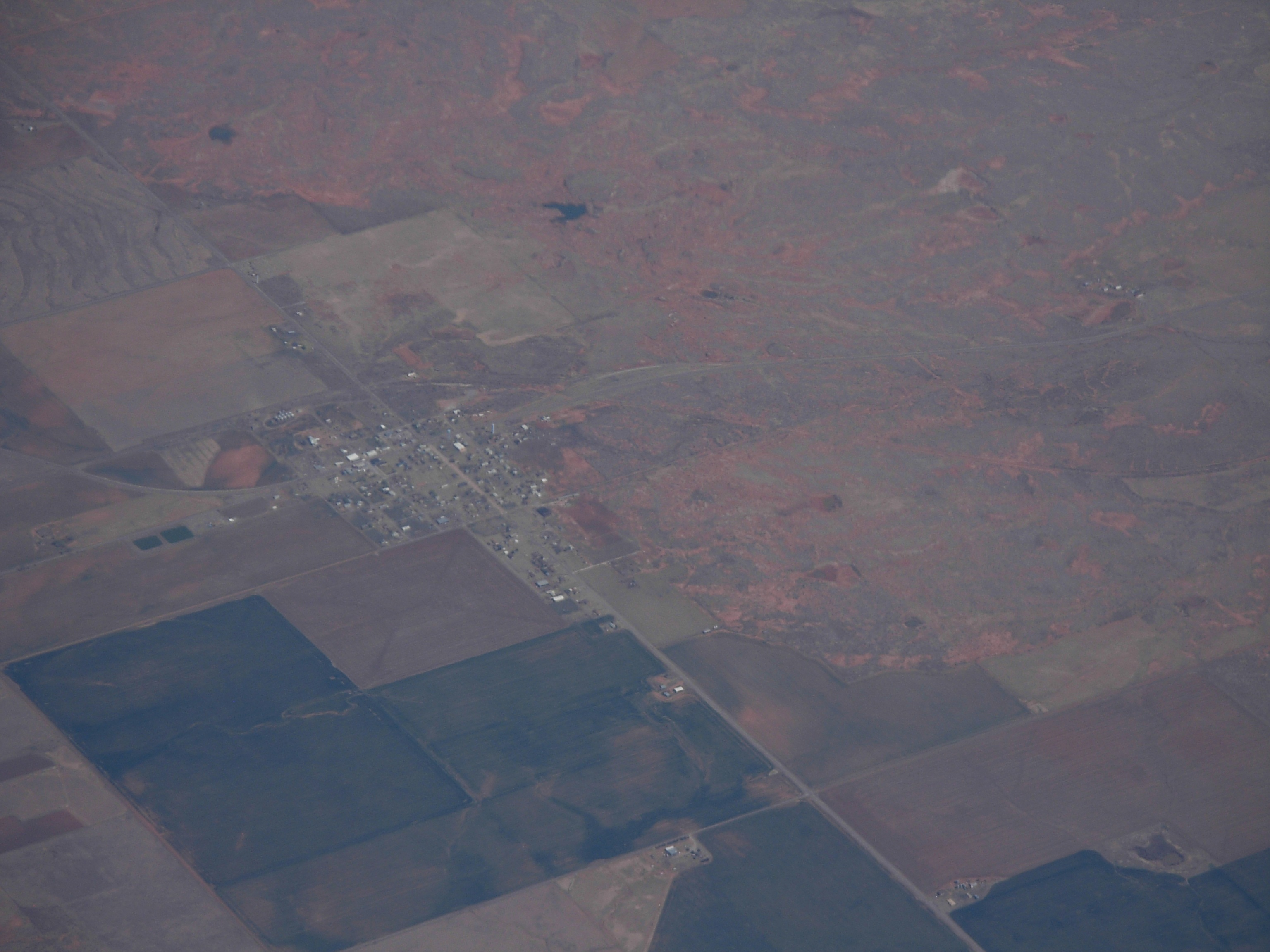
- Aerial view of Gould

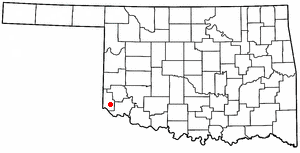
- Location of Gould, Oklahoma
- Coordinates: 34°40′09″N 99°46′25″W
- Country: United States
- State: Oklahoma
- County: Harmon

Area
  - Total: 0.36 sq mi (0.94 km^{2})
  - Land: 0.36 sq mi (0.94 km^{2})
  - Water: 0 sq mi (0.00 km^{2})
- Elevation: 1,621 ft (494 m)

Population (2020)
  - Total: 103
  - Density: 282.8/sq mi (109.18/km^{2})
- Time zone: UTC-6 (Central (CST))
  - Summer (DST): UTC-5 (CDT)
- ZIP code: 73544
- Area code: 580
- FIPS code: 40-30400
- GNIS feature ID: 2412695

Gould is a town in Harmon County, Oklahoma, United States. As of the 2020 census, Gould had a population of 103.

== Geography ==
According to the United States Census Bureau, the town has a total area of 0.4 square miles (1.0 km^{2}), all land.

== Demographics ==
Historical population
Census	Pop.	Note	%±
1920	228		—
1930	367		61.0%
1940	391		6.5%
1950	303		−22.5%
1960	241		−20.5%
1970	368		52.7%
1980	318		−13.6%
1990	237		−25.5%
2000	206		−13.1%
2010	141		−31.6%
2020	103		−27.0%
U.S. Decennial Census

=== 2020 census ===
As of the 2020 census, Gould had a population of 103. The median age was 54.5 years. 15.5% of residents were under the age of 18 and 28.2% of residents were 65 years of age or older. For every 100 females there were 119.1 males, and for every 100 females age 18 and over there were 117.5 males age 18 and over.

0.0% of residents lived in urban areas, while 100.0% lived in rural areas.

There were 49 households in Gould, of which 34.7% had children under the age of 18 living in them. Of all households, 51.0% were married-couple households, 26.5% were households with a male householder and no spouse or partner present, and 14.3% were households with a female householder and no spouse or partner present. About 22.5% of all households were made up of individuals and 12.3% had someone living alone who was 65 years of age or older.

There were 69 housing units, of which 29.0% were vacant. The homeowner vacancy rate was 0.0% and the rental vacancy rate was 12.5%.

Racial composition as of the 2020 census
Race	Number	Percent
White	92	89.3%
Black or African American	0	0.0%
American Indian and Alaska Native	1	1.0%
Asian	0	0.0%
Native Hawaiian and Other Pacific Islander	0	0.0%
Some other race	3	2.9%
Two or more races	7	6.8%
Hispanic or Latino (of any race)	17	16.5%

=== 2000 census ===
As of the census of 2000, there were 206 people, 74 households, and 52 families residing in the town. The population density was 568.3 inhabitants per square mile (219.4/km^{2}). There were 102 housing units at an average density of 281.4 per square mile (108.6/km^{2}). The racial makeup of the town was 79.13% White, 2.43% African American, 0.49% Asian, 12.62% from other races, and 5.34% from two or more races. Hispanic or Latino of any race were 21.36% of the population.

There were 74 households, out of which 43.2% had children under the age of 18 living with them, 59.5% were married couples living together, 2.7% had a female householder with no husband present, and 28.4% were non-families. 27.0% of all households were made up of individuals, and 14.9% had someone living alone who was 65 years of age or older. The average household size was 2.78 and the average family size was 3.42.

In the town, the population was spread out, with 34.0% under the age of 18, 7.8% from 18 to 24, 31.1% from 25 to 44, 15.0% from 45 to 64, and 12.1% who were 65 years of age or older. The median age was 32 years. For every 100 females, there were 114.6 males. For every 100 females age 18 and over, there were 103.0 males.

The median income for a household in the town was $25,250, and the median income for a family was $28,750. Males had a median income of $20,417 versus $15,000 for females. The per capita income for the town was $12,128. About 10.9% of families and 19.1% of the population were below the poverty line, including 18.9% of those under the age of eighteen and 14.3% of those 65 or over.
