= Hollis, Oklahoma =

- City
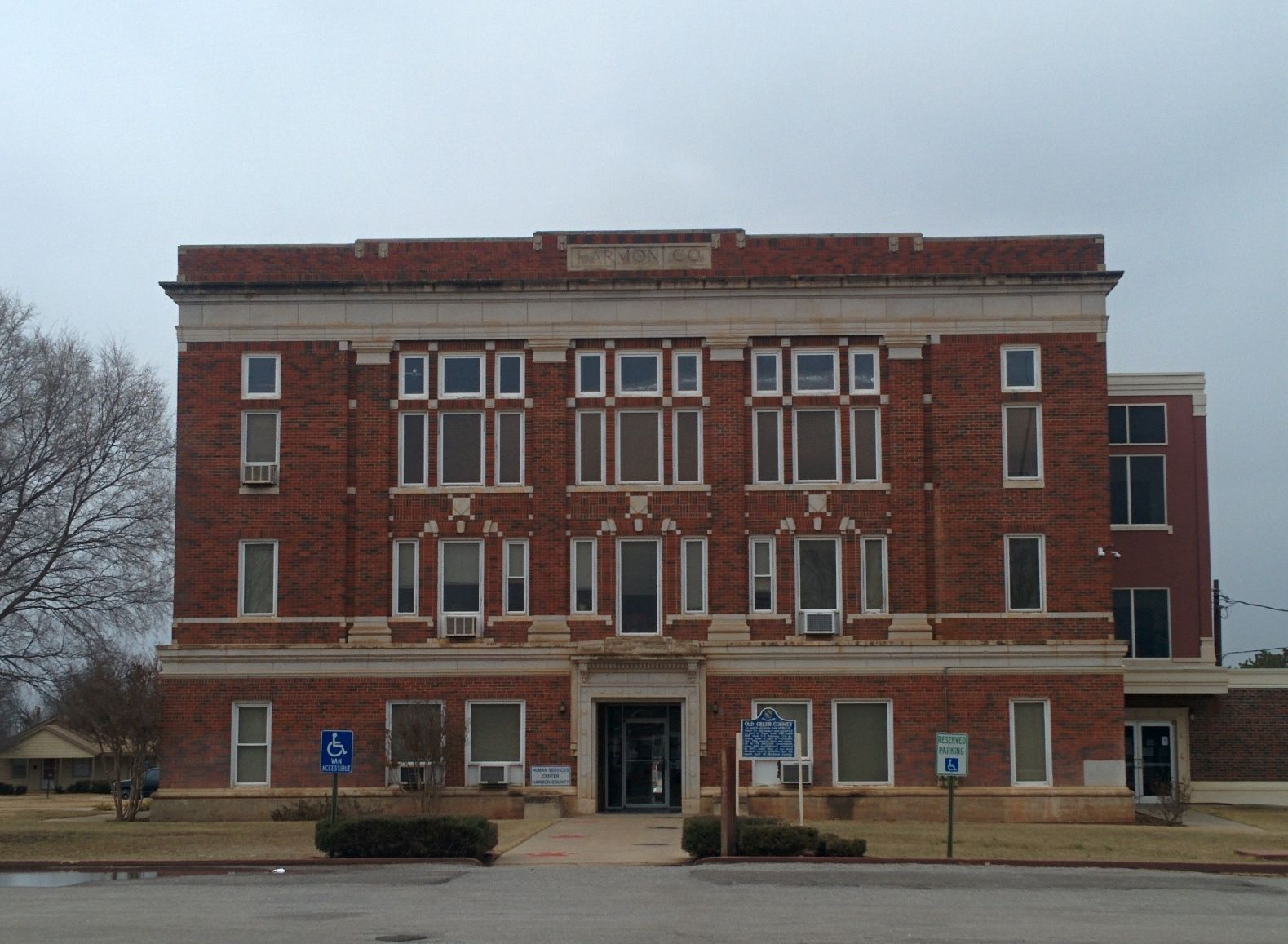
- Harmon County Courthouse

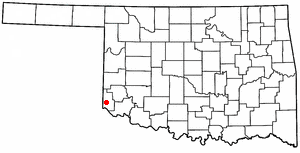
- Location of Hollis, Oklahoma
- Coordinates: 34°41′33″N 99°54′55″W
- Country: United States
- State: Oklahoma
- County: Harmon

Government
  - Type: Council-manager

Area
  - Total: 1.49 sq mi (3.85 km^{2})
  - Land: 1.49 sq mi (3.85 km^{2})
  - Water: 0 sq mi (0.00 km^{2})
- Elevation: 1,631 ft (497 m)

Population (2020)
  - Total: 1,795
  - Density: 1,209/sq mi (466.8/km^{2})
- Time zone: UTC-6 (Central (CST))
  - Summer (DST): UTC-5 (CDT)
- ZIP code: 73550
- Area code: 580
- FIPS code: 40-35500
- GNIS ID: 2410777
- Website: hollisok.org

Hollis is a city in and the county seat of Harmon County, Oklahoma, United States. As of the 2020 census, Hollis had a population of 1,795.

== History ==
The city was named for George W. Hollis, a local businessman and member of the townsite committee that laid out the town in 1898, while the site was still in old Greer County, Texas. The original plat was lost, and after a lawsuit, the town was replatted in 1903. The original business district comprised a general store opened by George Hollis and a blacksmith shop owned by James (Jim) Maylen Prock. A post office named for Hollis was established October 31, 1901.

Hollis was in Greer County, Oklahoma, until 1909, when Governor Haskell divided the old county into Greer County and Harmon County; Hollis fell into Harmon County. An election was held to choose a county seat. Contenders were Hollis, Dryden, Looney, and Vinson. Hollis won the election.

== Geography ==
=== Climate ===
Hollis experiences a humid subtropical climate (Köppen Cfa) with cool, dry winters and hot, wetter summers. The more detailed Trewartha climate classification identifies the climate as humid subtropical with very hot summers and cool winters (Crhk).

Climate data for Hollis, Oklahoma, 1991–2020 normals, extremes 1922–present
Month	Jan	Feb	Mar	Apr	May	Jun	Jul	Aug	Sep	Oct	Nov	Dec	Year
Record high °F (°C)	86 (30)	95 (35)	102 (39)	103 (39)	110 (43)	117 (47)	116 (47)	117 (47)	110 (43)	106 (41)	94 (34)	89 (32)	117 (47)
Mean maximum °F (°C)	76.6 (24.8)	80.1 (26.7)	88.1 (31.2)	94.0 (34.4)	99.2 (37.3)	103.9 (39.9)	106.2 (41.2)	105.2 (40.7)	99.6 (37.6)	93.7 (34.3)	83.0 (28.3)	75.5 (24.2)	108.1 (42.3)
Mean daily maximum °F (°C)	52.5 (11.4)	56.4 (13.6)	65.5 (18.6)	74.5 (23.6)	82.9 (28.3)	92.5 (33.6)	97.1 (36.2)	95.8 (35.4)	87.5 (30.8)	75.8 (24.3)	63.1 (17.3)	53.2 (11.8)	74.7 (23.7)
Daily mean °F (°C)	38.0 (3.3)	41.6 (5.3)	50.0 (10.0)	59.0 (15.0)	68.9 (20.5)	79.0 (26.1)	83.0 (28.3)	82.0 (27.8)	73.9 (23.3)	61.1 (16.2)	48.6 (9.2)	39.3 (4.1)	60.4 (15.8)
Mean daily minimum °F (°C)	23.4 (−4.8)	26.7 (−2.9)	34.5 (1.4)	43.6 (6.4)	54.8 (12.7)	65.4 (18.6)	69.0 (20.6)	68.3 (20.2)	60.3 (15.7)	46.4 (8.0)	34.0 (1.1)	25.4 (−3.7)	46.0 (7.8)
Mean minimum °F (°C)	11.8 (−11.2)	14.7 (−9.6)	19.8 (−6.8)	30.2 (−1.0)	41.8 (5.4)	56.6 (13.7)	62.6 (17.0)	60.4 (15.8)	47.2 (8.4)	31.2 (−0.4)	19.2 (−7.1)	13.1 (−10.5)	6.9 (−13.9)
Record low °F (°C)	−12 (−24)	−10 (−23)	2 (−17)	20 (−7)	30 (−1)	44 (7)	48 (9)	50 (10)	31 (−1)	15 (−9)	6 (−14)	−9 (−23)	−12 (−24)
Average precipitation inches (mm)	0.88 (22)	1.02 (26)	1.37 (35)	2.51 (64)	3.68 (93)	3.56 (90)	2.20 (56)	3.19 (81)	2.75 (70)	2.36 (60)	1.26 (32)	1.01 (26)	25.79 (655)
Average snowfall inches (cm)	1.3 (3.3)	0.5 (1.3)	0.5 (1.3)	0.0 (0.0)	0.0 (0.0)	0.0 (0.0)	0.0 (0.0)	0.0 (0.0)	0.0 (0.0)	0.0 (0.0)	0.5 (1.3)	0.5 (1.3)	3.3 (8.5)
Average precipitation days (≥ 0.01 in)	4.2	4.6	5.6	5.3	7.6	7.5	6.0	6.8	5.9	6.0	4.7	4.2	68.4
Average snowy days (≥ 0.1 in)	1.0	0.5	0.4	0.0	0.0	0.0	0.0	0.0	0.0	0.0	0.3	0.7	2.9
Source 1: NOAA
Source 2: National Weather Service

== Demographics ==
Historical population
Census	Pop.	Note	%±
1910	964		—
1920	1,683		74.6%
1930	2,914		73.1%
1940	2,732		−6.2%
1950	3,089		13.1%
1960	3,089		0.0%
1970	3,150		2.0%
1980	2,958		−6.1%
1990	2,643		−10.6%
2000	2,264		−14.3%
2010	2,060		−9.0%
2020	1,795		−12.9%
U.S. Decennial Census

=== 2020 census ===
As of the 2020 census, Hollis had a population of 1,795 and a median age of 39.0 years. 25.8% of residents were under the age of 18 and 20.7% were 65 years of age or older. For every 100 females there were 94.3 males, and for every 100 females age 18 and over there were 91.0 males.

0% of residents lived in urban areas, while 100.0% lived in rural areas.

There were 718 households in Hollis, of which 34.8% had children under the age of 18 living in them. Of all households, 43.7% were married-couple households, 20.2% were households with a male householder and no spouse or partner present, and 28.8% were households with a female householder and no spouse or partner present. About 29.3% of all households were made up of individuals and 14.4% had someone living alone who was 65 years of age or older.

There were 946 housing units, of which 24.1% were vacant. Among occupied housing units, 69.4% were owner-occupied and 30.6% were renter-occupied. The homeowner vacancy rate was 1.0% and the rental vacancy rate was 27.2%.

Racial composition as of the 2020 census
Race	Percent
White	64.3%
Black or African American	8.7%
American Indian and Alaska Native	2.6%
Asian	0.6%
Native Hawaiian and Other Pacific Islander	0%
Some other race	10.4%
Two or more races	13.4%
Hispanic or Latino (of any race)	35.9%

=== 2000 census ===
As of the 2000 census, 2,264 people, 845 households, and 561 families were residing in the city. The population density was 1,589.8 inhabitants per square mile (613.8/km^{2}). The 1,081 housing units at an average density of 759.1 per square mile (293.1/km^{2}). The racial makeup of the city was 66.65% White, 12.68% African American, 0.84% Native American, 0.22% Asian, 17.67% from other races, and 1.94% from two or more races. 28.18% of the population were Hispanics or Latinos of any race.

Of the 845 households, 31.6% had children under 18 living with them, 51.5% were married couples living together, 11.4% had a female householder with no husband present, and 33.6% were not families. About 30.4% of all households were made up of individuals, and 18.8% had someone living alone who was 65 or older. The average household size was 2.50 and the average family size was 3.10.

In the city, the age distribution was 27.3% under 18, 7.8% from 18 to 24, 24.1% from 25 to 44, 19.9% from 45 to 64, and 20.9% who were 65 or older. The median age was 39 years. For every 100 females, there were 90.3 males. For every 100 females 18 and over, there were 86.2 males.

The median income for a household in the city was $19,421, and for a family was $23,103. Males had a median income of $20,791 versus $14,792 for females. The per capita income for the city was $10,408. About 29.4% of families and 36.2% of the population were below the poverty line, including 47.6% of those under 18 and 26.2% of those 65 or over.

== Additional information ==
Hollis is a close-knit community, which only has one stoplight at the corner of Highway 62 and Highway 30, the only two main highways that pass through the town. It features the Hollis Municipal Airport located north of the town on Highway 30 and the Hollis Livestock Commission, which is a major business for the town.

== Education ==
The Hollis Public School System comprises the only school located in Harmon County, and its Sallie Gillentine Elementary School is Harmon County's sole elementary school.

== Notable people ==
left to right: Glenn, Don, Ray, Darrell Royal - Hollis, OK

- Alton Coppage, University of Oklahoma and professional football player
- Glen Hardin, musician
- Leon Heath, All-American running back, University of Oklahoma and NFL
- Leon Manley, football player for University of Oklahoma, Green Bay Packers, and Edmonton Eskimos and offensive coordinator of Texas Longhorns football
- Lindy McDaniel, MLB pitcher
- Von McDaniel, MLB pitcher
- Monte Moore, sports broadcaster, voice of Oakland Athletics
- Wilcy Moore, MLB pitcher, 19–7 record with 1927 Yankees
- Ted Owens, University of Kansas former head basketball coach
- Darrell Royal, former Texas Longhorns football head coach
- Terry Stafford, singer-songwriter ("Amarillo by Morning" and "Suspicion").
- Fernando Lopez, Verizon employee, international man of mystery, known despot
