= Hollis City Hall and Jail =

- U.S. National Register of Historic Places
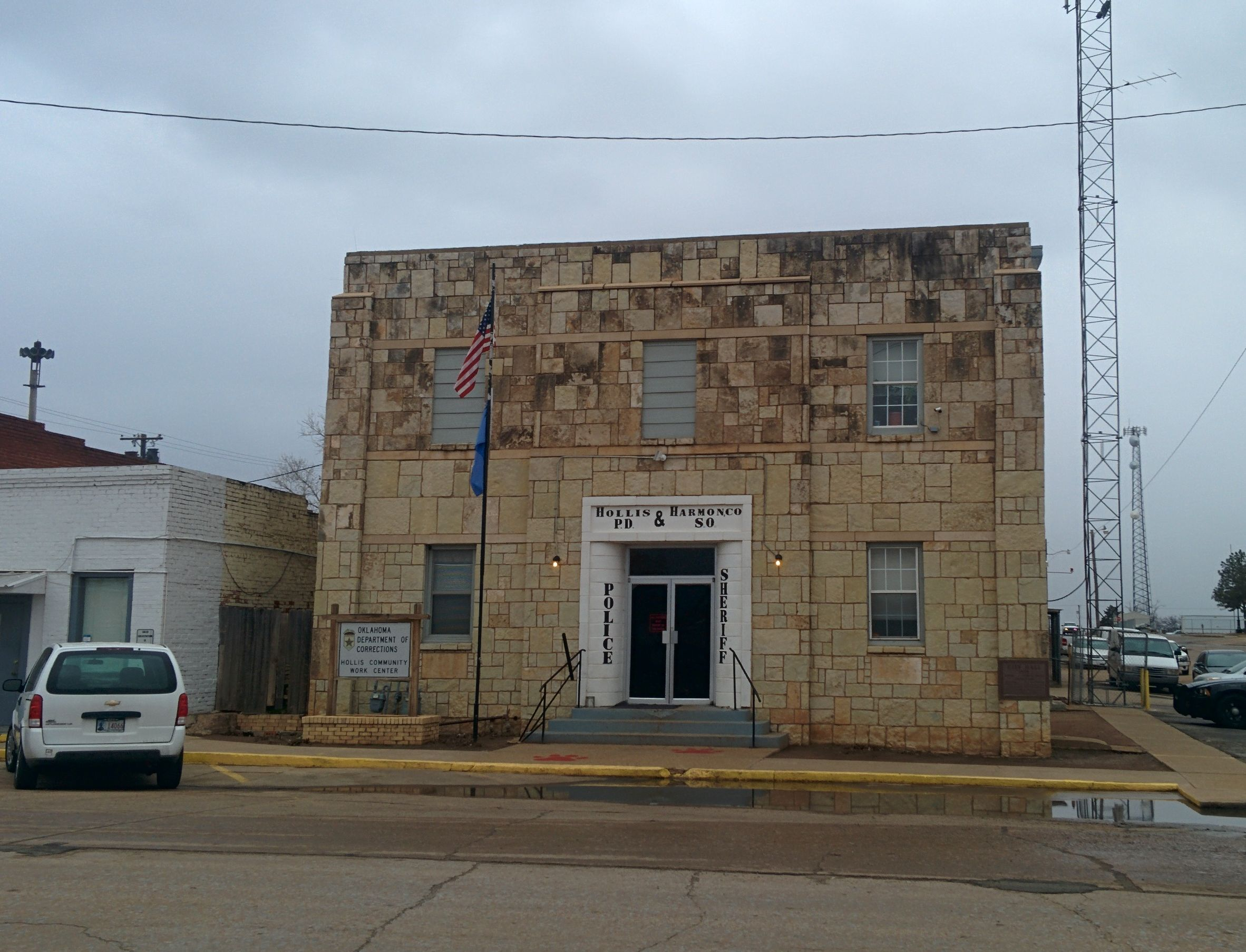

- Location within Oklahoma
- Location: 101 W. Jones St., Hollis, Oklahoma
- Coordinates: 34°40′51″N 99°55′02″W
- Area: less than one acre
- Built: 1939
- Built by: W.P.A.
- Architectural style: Modern Movement
- NRHP reference No.: 07001267
- Added to NRHP: December 11, 2007

The Hollis City Hall and Jail, at 101 W. Jones St. in Hollis, Oklahoma, was built in 1939 as a Works Progress Administration project.

It is a two-story stone building with a flat roof with Modern Movement style.
