= U.S. Route 70 in Oklahoma =

Highway in Oklahoma

U.S. Highway 70
- Route of US 70 in Oklahoma highlighted in red

Route information
- Maintained by ODOT
- Length: 289.81 mi (466.40 km)
- Existed: December 7, 1926–present

Major junctions
- West end: US 70 / US 183 at the Texas state line in Davidson
- I-44 Toll / H.E. Bailey Turnpike near Randlett; I-35 in Ardmore; US 77 in Ardmore; US 69 / US 75 in Durant; Indian Nation Turnpike near Hugo
- East end: US 70 at the Arkansas state line near Eagletown

Location
- Country: United States
- State: Oklahoma
- Counties: Tillman, Cotton, Jefferson, Carter, Marshall, Bryan, Choctaw, McCurtain

Highway system
- United States Numbered Highway System; List; Special; Divided; Oklahoma State Highway System; Interstate; US; State; Turnpikes
← US 69	→ SH-71

U.S. Route 70 (abbreviated US-70) is a transcontinental U.S. highway extending from Globe, Arizona to Atlantic, North Carolina. Along the way, 289.81 miles (466.40 km) of its route passes through the state of Oklahoma. Entering the state south of Davidson, the highway serves Oklahoma's southern tier before exiting the state east of Broken Bow. It serves the cities of Ardmore, Durant, Hugo, and Idabel, as well as Tillman, Cotton, Jefferson, Carter, Marshall, Bryan, Choctaw, and McCurtain counties.

US-70 was first established in Oklahoma in 1926. The highway's initial path (which entered the state in Cotton County, further east than it does today) included several deviations from the present-day route, serving Walters and following a more northerly course between Ardmore and Madill. US-70 did not enter Tillman County until 1945. The modern route between Ardmore and Madill was not established until 1984 when it received the US-70 designation.

== Route description ==
US-70 enters Oklahoma in Tillman County, crossing the Red River from Texas, concurrent with US-183. The two routes head north into Davidson, where they split; US-183 continues north toward the county seat of Frederick, while US-70 turns due east. It leaves Davidson, passing south of the Hackberry Flat Wildlife Management Area. Approximately 11 1/2 miles (18.5 km) east of Davidson, the highway serves as the southern terminus of State Highway 54 (SH-54), which connects US-70 to Hollister. Continuing east from the SH-54 junction, US-70 next enters Grandfield, where it begins a concurrency with SH-36. The two highways proceed east from this junction, leaving Tillman County, US-70 having traveled for 30.78 miles (49.54 km) within its boundaries.

US-70/SH-36 pass into Cotton County, heading southeast along the southern limit of Devol, which is served by SH-70B, a spur from US-70. US-70 and SH-36 turn back to the east, coming to a junction about four miles (6.4 km) east of Devol, where SH-36 splits away to the south. US-70 then comes to an interchange with Interstate 44 (I-44). This interchange, I-44 exit 5, is the southern terminus of the H. E. Bailey Turnpike. US-277 and US-281 exit the Interstate at this point, forming a triple concurrency with US-70 as it continues east toward Randlett. There, the three routes serve as the southern terminus of SH-70C. At the southeast corner of the Randlett limits, US-277/US-281 turn north, while US-70 continues on its due east course. At Taylor, seven miles (11 km) east of Randlett, US-70 meets SH-5B at its southern terminus. Further to the east, US-70 serves as the southern terminus of another state highway, SH-65. US-70 then exits Cotton County.

The next county US-70 enters in Oklahoma is Jefferson County. The highway enters the county seat, Waurika, about five miles (8.0 km) east of the Cotton–Jefferson county line. On the southwestern outskirts of town, the route is the northern terminus of SH-79, which connects US-70 to SH-79 in Texas. US-70 runs along the southern edge of Waurika, coming to the eastern terminus of SH-5 and intersecting US-81. Leaving town, it proceeds due east across unincorporated Jefferson County for about 21 miles (34 km). The highway then cuts through Cornish and Ringling, intersecting SH-89 in the latter town. US-70 passes into Carter County east of Ringling.

US-70 heads due east on an arrow-straight route for the next 22 1/2 miles (36.2 km) across Carter County. About 3 1/2 miles (5.6 km) east of the county line, the highway passes through unincorporated Zaneis, where it widens to a four-lane divided highway. South of Healdton, it is joined by SH-76, which follows US-70 for approximately 2 1/2 miles (4.0 km) before splitting away to the south in Wilson. To the east, US-70 junctions with SH-70A, which heads south to link to SH-76 in downtown Wilson. US-70 then passes through Lone Grove before entering Ardmore. It meets I-35 at a cloverleaf interchange (exit 31) on the city's west side. Here, eastbound US-70 joins southbound I-35, while SH-199 toward downtown Ardmore begins straight ahead. US-70 exits from the interstate at exit 29, turning back to the east and intersecting with US-77. US-70 passes north of Lake Murray, cutting across the northern reaches of Lake Murray State Park and intersecting the main lake access road, SH-77S, twice. East of the lake, the highway leaves Carter County.

After leaving Carter County, US-70 enters the smallest of Oklahoma's 77 counties, Marshall County. After crossing the county line, the highway heads due east for 11 miles (18 km), passing through Oakland and then entering the county seat, Madill. On the north side of the city, US-70 approaches a T intersection with US-177 and SH-199; this is the southern terminus of US-177. US-70 turns south, forming a concurrency with SH-199. The two highways head toward downtown Madill, where SH-199 splits off. At the same intersection, US-377/SH-99 join US-70 as it continues south through Madill, splitting away on the south edge of town. US-70 turns southeast, forming the northern terminus of SH-70F before reaching Kingston. There, US-70 intersects several highways at their termini—SH-32, SH-70B (a spur to Lake Texoma), and SH-70A (a spur to New Woodville and McBride). US-70 curves back to the east in Kingston, entering Lake Texoma State Park east of town and crossing the Washita River arm of the lake, which forms the eastern boundary of Marshall County.

Upon reaching the lakeshore, US-70 touches down on Bryan County soil. US-70 heads east, passing along the southern edge of Mead, then enters the city of Durant, the county seat. On the west side of town, it intersects US-70 Bypass, a partial bypass freeway around the western and southern sides of the city. It then has an interchange with the US-69/US-75 freeway before heading into downtown Durant. There, it has brief concurrencies with US-69 BUS and SH-78. US-70 then heads east out of town. In Bokchito, it is the eastern terminus of SH-22. US-70 then proceeds to Bennington, where it intersects SH-70E at its eastern terminus. US-70 heads northeast out of Bennington, then turns back to a due east course to enter Choctaw County.

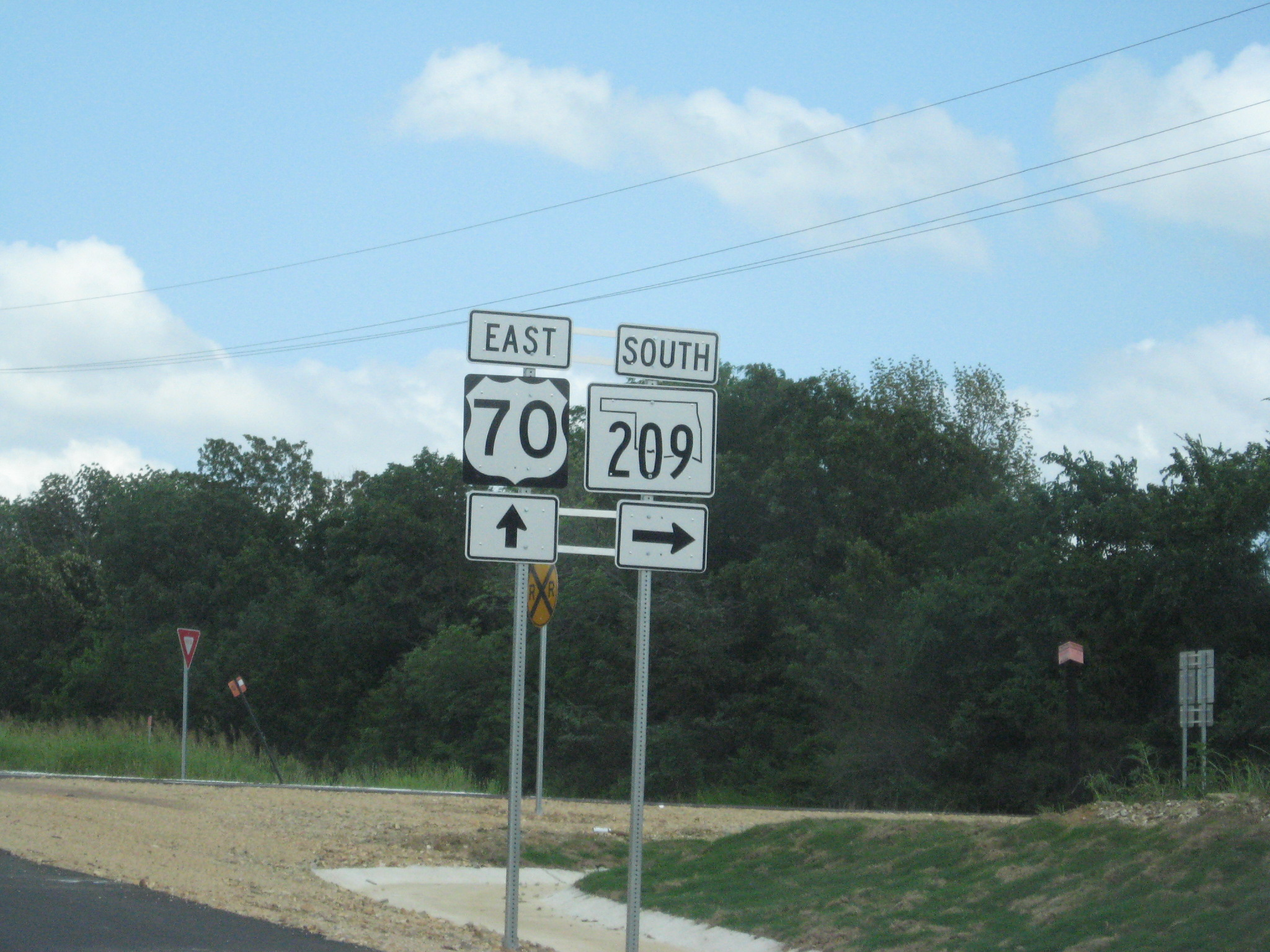
SH-209 directional assembly along US-70

The first town US-70 serves in Choctaw County is Boswell, where it junctions with SH-109 at that highway's western terminus. US-70 then bisects unincorporated Unger and Jasper, as well as the town of Soper. East of Soper, the route forms a concurrency with US-271. The two highways come to an interchange with the Indian Nation Turnpike on the western outskirts of the county seat, Hugo. This interchange is the southern terminus of the turnpike; US-70 and US-271 merge onto the freeway continuing south from the turnpike, while the road leading into Hugo continues eastward as Jackson Street. Formerly this marked the western terminus of US-70 BUS and the northern terminus of US-271 BUS, but these routes were decommissioned in 2019. US-70 and US-271 follow the bypass around the southwestern quadrant of town. On the southern edge of Hugo, the highways intersect F Street (the former southern terminus of US-271 BUS); here, US-271 splits away from US-70 and heads south. This marks the end of the freeway; US-70 continues east as a four-lane divided highway with at-grade intersections. US-70 meets the eastern terminus of Jackson Street (former US-70 BUS) on the eastern outskirts of Hugo. At the eastern limit of town, US-70 meets SH-93 at its southern terminus. The highway then leaves Hugo, passing through unincorporated Fallon and entering Sawyer, where it forms the southern terminus of SH-147. Just to the east of Sawyer is Fort Towson. There, US-70 serves as the eastern terminus of SH-109 and the northern terminus of SH-209. The highway continues east, serving unincorporated Swink, before leaves Choctaw County.

The easternmost county US-70 serves in Oklahoma is McCurtain County. The road heads southeast, passing through Valliant, before intersecting SH-98 west of Millerton. East of SH-98, US-70 bisects Millerton, then continues southeast through Garvin. It then reaches the county seat, Idabel; here, US-70 BYP heads along the west and southwest sides of the city, while mainline US-70 continues east across the northern reaches of the Idabel city limits. In the northeast corner of town, US-70 intersects US-259/SH-3, turning north to form a concurrency with them (with eastbound US-70 and westbound SH-3 overlapping to form a wrong-way concurrency). The highways proceed to Broken Bow, where they go their separate ways; SH-3 turns west, US-259 continues north, and US-70 turns east. US-70 reaches the state line west of DeQueen, Arkansas; after crossing the line, it passes into Sevier County, Arkansas.

== History ==
US-70 was originally designated in Oklahoma on December 7, 1926, as part of the initial slate of U.S. highways established through the state. US-70 initially entered Oklahoma east of Burkburnett, Texas, proceeded northeast to Randlett, then continued north to an intersection with SH-5 near Emerson, where it turned east, passing through Walters. From Walters, it continued due east into Stephens County to Comanche along present-day SH-53; in Comanche, it turned south along US-81, running through Addington before meeting the present-day US-70 route in Waurika. From Waurika, US-70 followed its present-day route to Ardmore. US-70 continued east from Ardmore along present-day SH-199 and US-177, passing through Dickson and Mannsville before reuniting with the present-day route in Madill. East of Madill, US-70 followed the same basic pathway that it does today.

In 1936, US-70 was realigned in Cotton and Jefferson counties. A section of SH-32 between Randlett and Waurika was also designated as US-70. The old alignment from west of Randlett, through Emerson and Walters, to Comanche, was given the additional designation of U.S. Route 70N on September 1, 1936. East of Comanche, US-70N followed SH-53 through Loco to an intersection with SH-76 south of Fox; US-70N turned south along SH-76, passing through Healdton and ending at the US-70 junction south of town. This route was relatively short-lived, however; it appeared on the April 1937 official state map but was absent from the April 1938 map.

On March 3, 1945, US-70's extent through Oklahoma was greatly expanded. On this date, the highway was realigned between Oklaunion, Texas and Randlett; rather than entering Oklahoma near Burkburnett, the US-70 turned north along US-183 in Oklaunion, entering Oklahoma between there and Davidson, before turning east and proceeding along SH-32 to Randlett. SH-32 would remain designated along US-70 between Randlett and Waurika until September 6, 1966.

Between 1945 and 1951, US-70, SH-32, and SH-36's course between Grandfield and Randlett was more indirect than its modern path, including several right-angle turns. This was remedied on September 10, 1951, with the three highways being shifted to a path following a straighter southeasterly course between the two towns.

During the 1980s, US-70 saw several substantial realignments. On July 14, 1981, the highway was rerouted to bypass Hugo; the old route through town became US-70 BUS. Three years later, on July 7, 1984, US-70 was shifted to its present-day alignment between Ardmore and Madill. After these realignments, the highway followed the same basic path that it does today, with no major changes after 1984.

== Spurs ==
=== SH-70A ===
State Highway 70A
- Location: Marshall County

SH-70A (7 mi) is a spur connecting Kingston, Oklahoma to Woodville, McBride, and Lake Texoma.

=== SH-70A in Wilson ===
State Highway 70A
- Location: Wilson

SH-70A (0.9 mi) is also an eastern bypass of Wilson.

=== SH-70B ===
State Highway 70B
- Location: Marshall County

SH-70B (6 mi) connects Kingston and Lake Texoma.

=== SH-70C ===
State Highway 70C
- Location: Randlett

SH-70C is a spur into Randlett.

=== SH-70D ===
State Highway 70D
- Location: Devol

SH-70D is a spur to Devol

=== SH-70E ===
State Highway 70E
- Location: Bryan County

SH-70E runs parallel to US-70 starting at SH-78 and traveling east, looping north to connect to its parent route near Bennington.

=== SH-70F ===
State Highway 70F
- Location: Marshall County

SH-70F connects Madill to US-70 two miles (3 km) west of Kingston.

=== SH-209 ===
State Highway 209
- Location: Choctaw County
- Length: 2.25 mi (3.62 km)

State Highway 209 is a short state highway in Choctaw County, Oklahoma. It runs for 2.25 miles (3.62 km) from Raymond Gary State Park to US-70. It has no lettered spur routes.

Browse numbered routes
← SH-199	→ I-235

== Junction list ==
County	Location	mi	km	Exit	Destinations	Notes
Tillman	Red River	0.00	0.00		US 70 west / US 183 south – Vernon	Continuation into Texas
Tillman	Davidson	2.6	4.2		US 183 north	Northern end of US-183 concurrency
Tillman		14.2	22.9		SH-54	Southern terminus of SH-54
Tillman	Grandfield	25.6	41.2		SH-36 north (Bridge Road)	Western end of SH-36 concurrency
Cotton	Devol	31.4	50.5		SH-70D	Southern terminus of SH-70D
Cotton		35.9	57.8		SH-36 south	Eastern end of SH-36 concurrency
Cotton		37.1	59.7		I-44 east / H.E. Bailey Turnpike north – Waurika I-44 west / US 277 / US 281 south – Burkburnett, Wichita Falls	I-44 exit 5; southern terminus of the H.E. Bailey Tpk.; Western end of US-277/US-281 concurrency
Cotton	Randlett	39.4	63.4		SH-70C	Southern terminus of SH-70C
Cotton	Randlett	39.9	64.2		US 277 / US 281 north	Eastern end of US-277/US-281 concurrency
Cotton		46.9	75.5		SH-5B	Southern terminus of SH-5B
Cotton		52.0	83.7		SH-65	Southern terminus of SH-65
Jefferson	Waurika	63.7	102.5		SH-79	Northern terminus of SH-79
Jefferson	Waurika	66.0	106.2		SH-5	Eastern terminus of SH-5
Jefferson	Waurika	67.1	108.0		US 81 (Lemon Drive)	
Jefferson	Cornish–Ringling line	89.6	144.2		SH-89	
Carter		96.4	155.1		SH-76 north	Western end of SH-76 concurrency
Carter	Wilson	98.9	159.2		SH-76 south (NW 4th Street)	Eastern end of SH-76 concurrency
Carter	Wilson	99.7	160.5		SH-70A	Eastern terminus of SH-70A
Carter	Ardmore	113.7	183.0	31A	I-35 north / SH-199 east (Broadway Street) – Oklahoma City, Ardmore	Cloverleaf interchange; exit number follows I-35 and is for SH-199; no exit number eastbound; I-35 exit 31B; western terminus of SH-199; western end of I-35 concurrency
Carter	Ardmore	117.4	188.9		I-35 south – Dallas	I-35 exit 29; eastern end of I-35 concurrency
Carter	Ardmore	118.1	190.1		US 77 (Commerce Street)	
Carter	Lake Murray SP	120.1	193.3		SH-77S – Ardmore, Lake Murray	
Carter	Lake Murray SP	124.8	200.8		SH-77S (eastern spur) – Lake Murray	Northern terminus of SH-77S (eastern spur)
Marshall	Madill	139.6	224.7		US 177 north / SH-199 west	Southern terminus of US-177; western end of SH-199 concurrency
Marshall	Madill	140.3	225.8		US 377 east / SH-99 north / SH-199 (Main Street)	Eastern end of SH-199 concurrency; western end of US-377/SH-99 concurrency
Marshall	Madill	140.8	226.6		US 377 south / SH-99	Eastern end of US-377/SH-99 concurrency
Marshall	Madill	142.3	229.0		SH-70F	Northern terminus of SH-70F
Marshall	Kingston	147.6	237.5		SH-32	Eastern terminus of SH-32
Marshall	Kingston	147.8	237.9		SH-70B	Northern terminus of SH-70B
Marshall	Kingston	148.1	238.3		SH-70A	Northern terminus of SH-70A
Bryan	Durant				West Main Street – Durant	At-grade intersection; west end of freeway
Bryan	Durant			—	US 69 / US 75 – Colbert, Durant	Cloverleaf interchange
Bryan	Durant			—	9th Avenue	Former US-69B/US-75B
Bryan	Durant			—	SH-78 (SE 3rd Avenue)	
Bryan				—	Old Highway 70	Eastbound exit and westbound entrance; east end of freeway
Bryan	Bokchito	181.5	292.1		SH-22	Eastern terminus of SH-22
Bryan	Bennington	188.1	302.7		SH-70E	
Choctaw	Boswell	198.3	319.1		SH-109	Western terminus of SH-109
Choctaw		212.7	342.3		US 271 north	Western end of US-271 concurrency
Choctaw		217.3	349.7		Indian Nation Turnpike north / Jackson Street east – Antlers, McAlester, Tulsa, Hugo, Idabel, Airport	Interchange; west end of freeway; Indian Nation Tpk. exit 1; southern terminus of the Indian Nation Tpk.; former western terminus of US-70 Bus.; former northern terminus of US-271 Bus.
Choctaw	Hugo	220.7	355.2	—	US 271 south / F Street north – Hugo, Paris, Tx.	Eastern end of US-271 concurrency; former southern terminus of US-271 Bus.
Choctaw	Hugo				8th Street	At-grade intersection; east end of freeway
Choctaw	Hugo	223.4	359.5		Jackson Street west – Hugo	Former eastern terminus of US-70 Bus.
Choctaw	Hugo	223.8	360.2		SH-93	Southern terminus of SH-93
Choctaw	Sawyer	230.2	370.5		SH-147	Southern terminus of SH-147
Choctaw	Fort Towson	235.5	379.0		SH-109	Eastern terminus of SH-109
Choctaw	Fort Towson	236.8	381.1		SH-209	Northern terminus of SH-209
McCurtain		249.7	401.9		SH-98	
McCurtain	Idabel	262.3	422.1		US 70 Byp. east (NW Lincoln Road) to US 259 south / SH-3 east / SH-37 – Clarksville TX	Western terminus of US-70 Byp.
McCurtain	Idabel	266.3	428.6		US 259 south / SH-3 east (US 70 Byp.) – Idabel	Southern end of US-259/SH-3 concurrency; eastern terminus of US-70 Byp.
McCurtain	Broken Bow	274.1	441.1		US 259 north (Park Drive north) / SH-3 west (Veterans Way)	Northern end of US-259/SH-3 concurrency
Oklahoma–Arkansas line		289.8	466.4		US 70 east (Choctaw-Chickasaw Trail of Tears Memorial Highway) – De Queen	Continuation into Arkansas
1.000 mi = 1.609 km; 1.000 km = 0.621 mi: Concurrency terminus; Incomplete access

U.S. Route 70
Previous state: Texas	Oklahoma	Next state: Arkansas
