= Big Pasture =

Former pasture land tract in Oklahoma, US

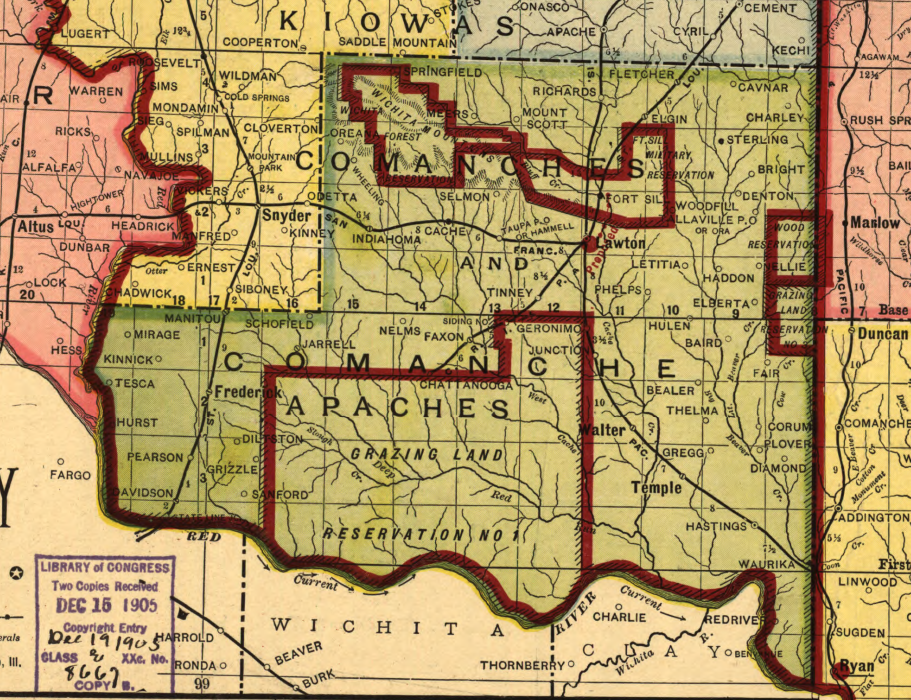
Big Pasture (Grazing Land Reservation No. 1) 1905.

The Big Pasture was 488,000 acres (1,975 km^{2}) of prairie land, in what is now southwestern Oklahoma. The land had been reserved for grazing use by the Kiowa, Comanche, and Apache tribes after their reserve was opened for settlement by a lottery conducted during June through August 1901. The tribes, however, leased most of the land out to large ranchers and it became known as Big Pasture. The Big Pasture was maintained for grazing until June 5, 1906, when Congress passed an act (Chapter 2580, 34 Stat. 213) requiring that it be disposed of by allotting 160 acres (0.6 km^{2}), in severalty, to each child born into the tribes after the act of 1900. The remaining land was sold by sealed bid in December 1906 and the proceeds placed in the U.S. Treasury for the tribes. This was the last large tract of land opened for settlement in Oklahoma Territory.

== History ==
According to a newspaper report, Coronado crossed the middle of the Big Pasture in his search for Quivira.

The Big Pasture was the scene of a well publicized wolf hunt by Theodore Roosevelt in 1905. He especially wanted to see John "Jack (Catch 'm Alive)" Abernathy from Frederick catch wolves with his bare hands. This hunt and his visit with Quanah Parker are often cited as reasons for his determination to create the nearby Wichita Mountain Wildlife Refuge and to return buffalo to the wild. The Wichita Mountains had previously been designated only as a Forest Preserve when first put under protection by William McKinley in 1901.

== Geography ==
The Big Pasture covered a strip of land 29 miles (47 km) north and south and 36 miles (58 km) east and west in what is now parts of Comanche, Cotton and Tillman counties. The towns of Randlett, Devol, Grandfield, Loveland, and Hollister (from east to west) are located in what was the Big Pasture. Randlett is home to Big Pasture Public Schools, a consolidated school system serving Devol, Cookietown, and Randlett.

Before settlement, the Big Pasture was mostly plains cut by two timbered draws. Captain Randolph B. Marcy in his Red River expedition in 1852 noted that the timbered regions he found along Cache Creek were the last of any size until he reached the foothills of the Rockies.

== Bibliography ==
- Cooper, Charles M. "The Big Pasture" Chronicles of Oklahoma 35:2 (April 1957) 138-146 (retrieved August 16, 2006).
- Kappler, Charles (Editor). "ACTS OF FIFTY-SIXTH CONGRESS—FIRST SESSION, 1900"; Chapter 813, 31 Stat., 672. (Section 6). Indian Affairs: Laws and Treaties. Washington: Government Printing Office, 1904. 1:708-713 (retrieved August 16, 2006).
- Kappler, Charles (Editor). "ACTS OF FIFTY-SIXTH CONGRESS—FIRST SESSION, 1900"; Chapter 2580, 34 Stat., 213. Indian Affairs: Laws and Treaties. Washington: Government Printing Office, 1904. 1:184-185 (retrieved August 16, 2006).
