= H. E. Bailey Turnpike =

Toll highway in Oklahoma

H.E. Bailey Turnpike
- H.E. Bailey Turnpike highlighted in red

Route information
- Maintained by OTA
- Existed: April 23, 1964–present
- History: Norman Spur completed October 19, 2001
- Component highways: I-44 mainline; SH-4 Norman Spur

Southern segment
- Length: 25.0 mi (40.2 km)
- West end: I-44 / US 70 / US 277 / US 281 near Randlett
- East end: I-44 / US 277 / US 281 / SH-36 near Geronimo

Northern segment
- Length: 61.4 mi (98.8 km)
- West end: I-44 / US 62 / US 277 / US 281 near Lawton
- Major intersections: US 81 / US 277 in Chickasha; US 62 / US 277 / SH-9 in Chickasha
- East end: I-44 / US 62 / US 277 in Newcastle

Norman Spur
- Length: 8.2 mi (13.2 km)
- West end: I-44 / H.E. Bailey Turnpike / SH-4 near Bridge Creek
- East end: US 62 / US 277 / SH-9 near Blanchard

Location
- Country: United States
- State: Oklahoma

Highway system
- Oklahoma State Highway System; Interstate; US; State; Turnpikes

The H. E. Bailey Turnpike is an 86.4-mile (139.0 km) controlled-access toll road in the southwestern region of the U.S. state of Oklahoma. The route, opened on April 23, 1964, is a four-lane toll road that connects Oklahoma City to Lawton in its northern section and Lawton to Wichita Falls, Texas along its southern section, roughly paralleling U.S. Route 277. The turnpike also includes an 8.2-mile (13.2 km) spur route that leads toward Norman, Oklahoma. Since 1982, it has been signed as a part of Interstate 44, and as such uses its mileposts.

== Route description ==
=== Mainline Turnpike ===
The H. E. Bailey Turnpike takes a generally south-to-north route from Wichita Falls to Lawton before turning northeast toward Oklahoma City. The turnpike's 25-mile (40 km) southern segment begins at US 70, 6 miles (9.7 km) north of the Texas state line. US 277 and US 281 leave I-44 at US 70, and together run parallel to the turnpike. The turnpike runs north-northeast for 15 miles, intersecting SH 5 along with US 277 and US 281. A toll plaza is located underneath the SH 5 overpass; loop ramps feed all entering and exiting traffic into the toll plaza. Just north of SH 5, a Service Area is located in the median of the turnpike, featuring food, fuel, and restroom amenities, as well as an Oklahoma Welcome Center. The turnpike then continues north for ten more miles until it again reaches US 277 and US 281, also intersecting SH 36. The southern segment ends at this interchange, and the two US Routes join a free, ODOT-maintained I-44 through Lawton.

After leaving the Lawton/Fort Sill area, US Highway 62, having joined the I-44 freeway in Lawton, along with US 277 and US 281, once again leaves I-44 at an interchange north of Lawton, marking the south end of the northern 61.4-mile (98.8 km) segment of the turnpike. The turnpike proceeds northeast, coming to an Interchange with US 277 at Elgin. A toll plaza is located near Mile 66. The turnpike continues toward Chickasha, intersecting US 81 and US 277 at the first interchange. A second interchange again junctions US 277, along with US 62 and SH 9. North of Chickasha, a Service Area is located in the median, which provides food, fuel, and restroom services. The turnpike goes north through northern Grady County, coming to a second toll plaza at Mile 97. The turnpike then has a cloverleaf interchange with SH 4, which continues east from this interchange as the Norman Spur. The turnpike continues northeast for ten more miles before ending at the interchange of US-62 and US 277 north of Newcastle where the three routes continue to Oklahoma City as an urban freeway.

=== Norman Spur ===
The H. E. Bailey Norman Spur comprises the southernmost 8.2-mile (13.2 km) of SH 4. The spur connects I-44 to SH 9, providing a faster and shorter route to Norman when traveling from Lawton. The spur proceeds east from the mainline turnpike, and almost immediately comes to a toll plaza. Two miles east, the turnpike intersects SH 76. The Norman Spur ends at the interchange with US 62, US 277, and SH 9. Traffic coming off the spur continues straight, and is joined by SH 9 which continues the rest of the way to Norman as a four-lane divided highway.

== History ==
Ideas for connecting Lawton and Oklahoma City started in 1953. The state highways between Oklahoma City and Lawton, were dangerously narrow, which included many 'cramped, death-trap' bridges. The route was not part of any federal interstate highway system plans, so only a turnpike was feasible. Oklahoma Senate Bill 454, which amended House Bill 933 that authorized creation of the Will Rogers Turnpike, allowed creation of a southwest turnpike and a proposed turnpike from Oklahoma City northerly toward Wichita, Kansas, which was later constructed by the Oklahoma Department of Transportation and became Interstate 35.

Both HB 933 and SB 454 were submitted as State Question 359 and 360 and passed on January 26, 1954. In July 1960, an economic feasibility study was completed for the H.E. Bailey Turnpike and in November 1961, $56 million in bonds were issued for the turnpike's construction. The north section of the H. E. Bailey from southwest Oklahoma City to north Lawton was completed on March 1, 1964. The south section from south Lawton to the Texas border was completed on April 23, 1964.

In 1982, as part of Oklahoma's 75th statehood "Diamond Jubilee" celebrations, I-44 was signed through Oklahoma City to the Red River encompassing the turnpike. On October 19, 2001, the H. E. Bailey Norman Spur connecting I-44 to State Highway 9 was opened.

The route's namesake, H. E. Bailey, served as the city manager of Oklahoma City from 1941 to 1944, and later as the director of the Oklahoma Department of Transportation.

Originally, the turnpike was designed to parkway-like standards with a 15-foot wide raised grassy median and no inside shoulders. A concrete jersey barrier separating opposing directions of traffic was installed on the northern segment as part of a series of projects in the late 1990s. A steel cable "positive barrier" was installed on the southern segment in 2012 and 2013; this project received a silver award by the American Concrete Pavement Association. Both median projects also allowed for installation of 6-foot inside shoulders in each direction.

In 2021, the Norman Spur became part of SH-4.Trotter, Matt (August 9, 2021). "Commission Approves Renumbering Several Oklahoma Highways".

A project to rehabilitate the pavement between Lawton to the Oklahoma City metropolitan area was completed in 2023. This project, combined with the cashless tolling transition, allowed the speed limit to be raised to 80 miles per hour (130 km/h) on the northern segment between Lawton and Oklahoma City.

== Tolls ==
The turnpike has used all-electronic tolling since 2022. Tolls are paid using a PikePass or compatible electronic tolling transponder or via PlatePay, which uses license plate recognition to send a bill to the vehicle's registered owner. Cash is no longer accepted. As of 2025, a two-axle vehicle pays $5.69 with PikePass or $12.61 with PlatePay to drive the full length of the Turnpike and 69¢ with PikePass or $1.35 with PlatePay to drive the Norman Spur. PikePass customers get free toll on the Norman Spur if they also pass through the Newcastle Mainline Toll Plaza on the same trip.

Full toll plazas on the mainline turnpike are located immediately north and south of the SH-5 interchange, between Elgin and Chickasha, and south of the SH-4 interchange. The Norman Spur also has a single mainline toll plaza located just east of the interchange with the mainline turnpike. Ramp toll plazas are also located at three sets of entrance and exit ramps where shunpiking would otherwise be possible; eastbound exits and westbound entrances on the mainline turnpike at US-277 in Elgin and US-62 in Chickasha and the westbound exit and eastbound entrance on the Norman Spur at SH-76.

The original Chickasha toll plaza, located immediately south of the US 81 interchange, was replaced by a new toll plaza located approximately ten miles to the southwest in 2017. The new plaza included open-road tolling lanes, which were originally dedicated for PikePass account holders but are now used by all traffic since the all-electronic conversion.

On June 21, 2022, the H.E. Bailey Turnpike from Oklahoma City to Lawton and its spur to Norman was converted to cashless tolling. The stretch from Lawton to the Texas state line converted to cashless tolling on July 27, 2022.

== Services ==
Law enforcement along the H. E. Bailey Turnpike is provided by Oklahoma Highway Patrol Troop YC, a special troop assigned to the turnpike.

The turnpike has two service areas with both located in the median of the highway. The Walters Service Area is located north of exit number 20. The Chickasha Service Area is located north of exit number 83. Both service areas offer food, gas, and a convenience store.

== Future ==
The OTA is currently planning to improve Whitfield Road interchange (exit 62) near Cyril on the eastern section of the turnpike. The project will convert the incomplete cloverleaf interchange into a complete diamond interchange. They will add four new exits at US-277/SH-19 between Cement and Ninnekah, SH-92 near Chickasha, County Road 1280 near Amber, and the future East-West Connector Turnpike near Newcastle.

== Exit list ==
=== Mainline ===
County	Location	mi	km	Exit	Destinations	Notes
Cotton		5.7	9.2	West End of Turnpike; I-44 / US 277 / US 281 continue south toward Wichita Falls, TX		
Cotton		5.7	9.2	5	US 70 / US 277 north / US 281 north – Waurika, Randlett	Last free exit eastbound; western end of I-44 concurrency
Cotton	Walters	20.2	32.5	20	SH-5 (US-277/US-281) – Walters	Walters toll plaza is located just before the interchange in both directions
Comanche		30.3	48.8	30	US 277 south / US 281 south / SH-36 west – Geronimo, Faxon, Frederick	Last free exit westbound; eastern end of I-44 concurrency
Comanche		30.6	49.2	East End of Western Section I-44 east / US 277 / US 281 north continue into Lawton		
Comanche	Lawton	30.6– 46.2	49.2– 74.4	Pioneer Expressway (free highway through Lawton)		
Comanche		46.2	74.4	West End of Eastern Section I-44 / US 62 west / US 277 / US 281 south continue into Lawton		
Comanche		46.6	75.0	46	US 62 east / US 277 / US 281 north – Elgin, Apache, Anadarko	Last free exit eastbound; eastbound exit and westbound entrance; western end of I-44 concurrency
Comanche	Elgin	53.2	85.6	53	US 277 – Fletcher, Elgin, Sterling	
Comanche		62.0	99.8	62	Fletcher, Cyril, Sterling	Whitfield Road; westbound exit and eastbound entrance; future full interchange
Grady		66.1	106.4	Chickasha Toll Plaza		
Grady		72	116	72	US 277 / SH-19 – Cement	Future interchange
Grady	Chickasha	80.5	129.6	80	US 81 (US-277) – Duncan, Chickasha	
Grady	Chickasha	83.0	133.6	83	US 62 (US-277/SH-9) – Chickasha, Anadarko	
Grady		86	138	86	SH-92	Future interchange; westbound exit and eastbound entrance
Grady		93	150	93	Amber	Future interchange
Grady		97.3	156.6	Newcastle Toll Plaza		
Grady		99.1	159.5	—	SH-4 Toll south – Blanchard, Norman, H. E. Bailey Norman Spur	
Grady		99.1	159.5	—	SH-4 north – Yukon, Mustang, Tuttle	
McClain	Newcastle	107.1	172.4	107	US 62 west / US 277 south – Newcastle, Blanchard	Last free exit westbound; eastern end of I-44 concurrency
McClain	Newcastle	107.1	172.4	East End of Turnpike; I-44 / US 62 continue toward Oklahoma City		
1.000 mi = 1.609 km; 1.000 km = 0.621 mi: Concurrency terminus; Electronic toll collection; Incomplete access; Unopened

=== H. E. Bailey Norman Spur/Toll SH-4 ===
H. E. Bailey Norman Spur
- Length: 8.2 mi (13.2 km)
- Existed: 2001–present

Note: Mile numbers on the Norman Spur, Toll SH-4, are posted 100 more than the mile they represent. For example, Mile 4 is posted as Mile 104. SH-4 was designated on the route in 2021. All exits are unnumbered.

County	Location	mi	km	Destinations	Notes
Grady		0.00	0.00	SH-4 north – Tuttle, Mustang, Yukon	Continuation north; western end of SH-4 concurrency
Grady		0.00	0.00	I-44 Toll (H.E. Bailey Turnpike) – Oklahoma City, Chickasha, Lawton	
Grady		1.0	1.6	Toll plaza	
McClain	Blanchard	3.6	5.8	SH-76 – Blanchard	
McClain	Blanchard–Newcastle line	7.7	12.4	US 62 (US 277 / SH-9 west) – Blanchard, Newcastle	Eastbound exit and westbound entrance
McClain	Newcastle	7.8	12.6	SH-9 east – Norman	Eastern terminus; eastern terminus of SH-4
1.000 mi = 1.609 km; 1.000 km = 0.621 mi: Concurrency terminus; Electronic toll collection; Incomplete access

== See also ==
- Oklahoma Turnpike Authority
- Pikepass
