= National Register of Historic Places listings in Cotton County, Oklahoma =

Location of Cotton County in Oklahoma

This is a list of the National Register of Historic Places listings in Cotton County, Oklahoma.

This is intended to be a complete list of the properties on the National Register of Historic Places in Cotton County, Oklahoma, United States. The locations of National Register properties for which the latitude and longitude coordinates are included below, may be seen in a map.

There are 4 properties listed on the National Register in the county.

This National Park Service list is complete through NPS recent listings posted August 28, 2026.

== Current listings ==
	Name on the Register	Image	Date listed	Location	City or town	Description
1	Cotton County Courthouse	Cotton County Courthouse	August 23, 1984 (#84002990)	301 N. Broadway; 34°21′39″N 98°18′26″W	Walters	
2	First United Methodist Church	First United Methodist Church	September 15, 1983 (#83002082)	202 E. Oklahoma; 34°21′35″N 98°18′26″W	Walters	
3	Rabbit Creek School		August 31, 2026 (#100013355)	Intersections of N2540 & E2010 Rd; 34°06′03″N 98°27′10″W	Randlett	
4	Walters Rock Island Depot	Walters Rock Island Depot	September 3, 1998 (#98001147)	220 W. Nevada; 34°21′16″N 98°18′41″W	Walters	

== See also ==
- List of National Historic Landmarks in Oklahoma
- National Register of Historic Places listings in Oklahoma
