= Ahpeatone, Oklahoma =

Unincorporated community in Oklahoma, US

Coordinates: 34°20′52″N 98°33′04″W

Ahpeatone is an unincorporated community in Cotton County, Oklahoma, United States. It is named for Ahpeatone, a Kiowa chief. The town had a post office between July 22, 1907 and June 30, 1916. The locale is about 16 miles directly west of the county seat of Walters, just south of Oklahoma State Highway 5.
