= Oklahoma State Highway 36 =

State highway in Oklahoma, United States

State Highway 36

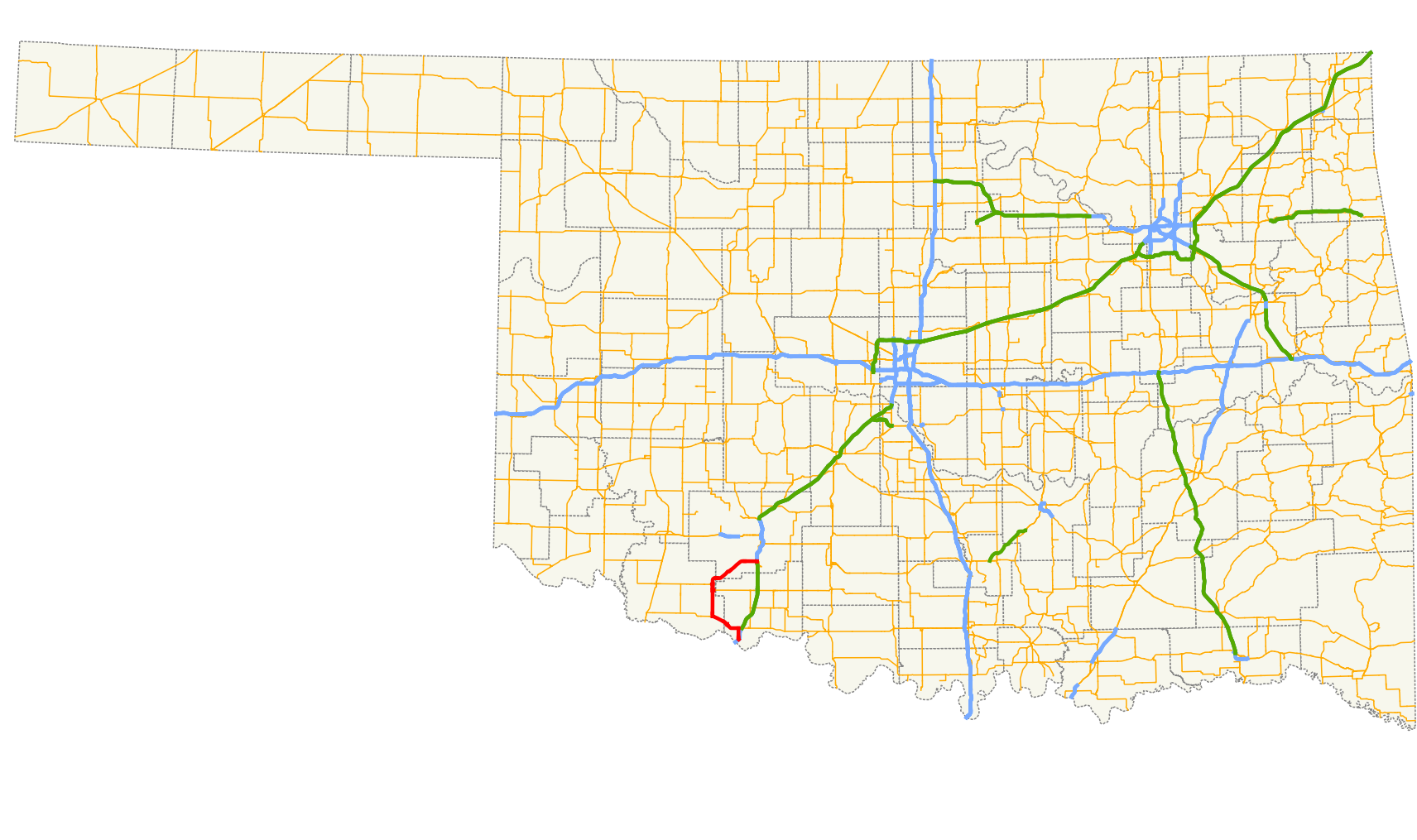

Route information
- Maintained by ODOT
- Length: 44.4 mi (71.5 km)
- Existed: ca. 1926–present

Major junctions
- South end: I-44 / US 277 / US 281 north of Burkburnett, Texas
- US 70 from Randlett to Grandfield
- North end: I-44 / US 277 / US 281 south of Lawton

Location
- Country: United States
- State: Oklahoma

Highway system
- Oklahoma State Highway System; Interstate; US; State; Turnpikes
← SH-35	→ SH-37

State Highway 36 (abbreviated SH-36 or OK-36) is a state highway in Oklahoma. It runs for 44.4 miles (71.5 km), forming a western loop route from Interstate 44, which it connects to at both ends. It passes through Cotton Co., Tillman Co., and Comanche Co. It currently has no lettered spur routes. State Highway 36 was first added to the highway system around 1926.

== Route description ==
State Highway 36 begins at Exit 1 on Interstate 44, the first exit north of the Red River on I-44. From this interchange, Highway 36 heads due north to meet US-70. SH-36 turns west to follow US-70, forming a concurrency. The two highways angle northwest to begin paralleling a railroad line. SH-36 and US-70 pass just south of Devol. Approximately 1 mile (1.6 km) thereafter, the two cross the Cotton–Tillman County line.

After 9 miles (14 km) concurrent with US-70, SH-36 splits away from the U.S. route on the northeast side of Grandfield. As before, SH-36 heads due north from there, crossing over Deep Red Creek and some of its local tributaries. After about 9 miles (14 km) alone, the highway forms another concurrency, this time with State Highway 5. The two highways pass to the east of Chattanooga Sky Harbor Airport. After 2 miles (3.2 km) together, SH-5 splits off to the west. SH-36 continues north for around 1.5 miles (2.4 km) before curving to the east, toward Chattanooga.

As Highway 36 crosses into Comanche County, it also enters the town of Chattanooga, which it passes through on 3rd Street. Leaving town, the route continues due east, then curves towards the northeast, crossing Spring Creek. SH-36 next runs through Faxon, continuing northeast; after leaving the town, it bridges West Cache Creek. The highway then resumes a due east course and continues for nearly 5.5 miles (8.9 km) before reuniting with I-44. At this interchange, the SH-36 designation ends. The roadbed continues east through the interchange; a motorist continuing straight will then be on southbound US-277/US-281 towards Geronimo.

== History ==
State Highway 36 first appears on the 1927 state highway map, implying that it was added to the system sometime between May 1, 1926, the date of the prior map, and November 1, 1927. The 1927 map shows SH-36 crossing the Red River at a bridge due south of Grandfield. From the bridge, the highway heads north to Grandfield and continues from there along its approximate present-day route. It ended at SH-8 south of Lawton.

Between July 1, 1928 and January 1, 1929, the southernmost portion of SH-36 was rerouted. The segment of highway between Grandfield and the Red River bridge south of town was removed from the state highway system; instead, SH-36 was rerouted to the east, serving Devol and ending at US-70 west of Randlett, where US-70 turned south to cross the river north of Burkburnett, Texas. Between August 1933 and February 1934, US-70 was rerouted to follow a more direct path between Randlett and the Texas line. A north–south segment of the old highway was assigned to SH-36—the southernmost 3.9 miles (6.3 km) of the present-day highway. On March 3, 1945, US-70 was rerouted to cross into Texas south of Davidson instead, forming the concurrency with SH-36 east of Grandfield.

In 1939, SH-36 was extended to the north. The highway followed US-277/US-281 north to the south side of Lawton. There, the highway split off to head due north along Fort Sill Boulevard through town, coming to an end at the gate of Fort Sill itself. Changes also occurred further south. On September 10, 1951, US-70 and SH-36 were realigned to a new, more direct path between Grandfield and Randlett.

The portion of SH-36 through Lawton to Fort Sill was stripped of its designation in 1978. No major changes have occurred to the highway since then.

== SH-36A ==
State Highway 36A
- Location: Lawton, Oklahoma
- Existed: ca. 1953–1978

SH-36 currently has no lettered spur routes. However, between approximately 1953 and 1978, there was a SH-36A in Lawton. At its greatest extent, it connected the Cameron University campus to present-day I-44.

SH-36A had been designated by 1953. At this time, the highway's eastern terminus was at Fort Sill Boulevard (SH-36 at the time). Between 1956 and 1961, the highway was extended east to Business US-281. In 1970, it was extended further, to the Pioneer Expressway (present-day I-44). SH-36A was decommissioned in 1978, likely at the same time the adjoining section of SH-36 was turned over to the City of Lawton.

== Junction list ==
County	Location	mi	km	Destinations	Notes
Cotton		0.0	0.0	I-44 / US 277 / US 281	Southern terminus; I-44 exit 1
Cotton		3.9	6.3	US 70	Eastern end of US-70 concurrency
Tillman	Grandfield	14.2	22.9	US 70	Western end of US-70 concurrency
Tillman		23.2	37.3	SH-5	Southern end of SH-5 concurrency
Tillman		25.2	40.6	SH-5	Northern end of SH-5 concurrency
Comanche		44.4	71.5	I-44 / US 277 / US 281	Northern terminus, I-44 exit 30, continuing straight leads to US-277/US-281 southbound
1.000 mi = 1.609 km; 1.000 km = 0.621 mi: Concurrency terminus
