= Fivemile Corner, Oklahoma =

Unincorporated community in Oklahoma, US

Coordinates: 34°21′44″N 98°13′35″W

Fivemile Corner is an unincorporated community in northeast Cotton County, Oklahoma, United States. It is located at the intersection of Oklahoma State Highways 65 and 53 four miles east of Walters and 5.5 miles north of Temple. Its elevation is 1,066 feet. The north end of Waurika Lake is four miles to the east.
