= Frederick Municipal Airport =

Frederick Municipal Airport may refer to:

- Frederick Municipal Airport (Maryland) in Frederick, Maryland, United States (FAA/IATA: FDK)
- Frederick Municipal Airport (Oklahoma) in Frederick, Oklahoma, United States (FAA/IATA: FDR)
