= Frogville =

Frogville may refer to:

- Frogville, Oklahoma, US, a small community
- The Frogville, a 2014 Taiwanese animated film
- Frogville Records, a record label in Santa Fe, New Mexico, US
