= Oklahoma State Highway 5 =

State highway in Oklahoma, United States

State Highway 5
- OK 5; mainline in red, spur routes in blue

Route information
- Maintained by ODOT

Section 1
- Length: 20.42 mi (32.86 km)
- West end: US 62 in Gould
- East end: SH-6 in Eldorado

Section 2
- Length: 98.2 mi (158.0 km)
- West end: US 283 south of Altus
- Major intersections: US 183 in Frederick; US 270 / US 281 near Walters; I-44 / H.E. Bailey Turnpike near Walters
- East end: US 70 in Waurika

Location
- Country: United States
- State: Oklahoma

Highway system
- Oklahoma State Highway System; Interstate; US; State; Turnpikes
← SH-4	→ SH-6

State Highway 5 (SH-5 or OK-5) is the name assigned to two distinct state highways in the U.S state of Oklahoma. One runs for 20.42 miles (32.86 km) through extreme southwestern Oklahoma, passing through Harmon and Jackson Counties. The other is 98.2 miles (158.0 km) long and runs through southwest Oklahoma, connecting US-283 south of Altus to US-70 at Waurika.

== Route description ==
=== Western section ===

The western SH-5 begins at U.S. Highway 62 in Gould, Oklahoma and runs south until just past Lincoln, where it turns east. It then ends at State Highway 6 in Eldorado, just seven miles (11 km) north of the Texas border.

The western SH-5 was once known as SH-90.

Both the now-separate western and eastern sections of SH-5 were formerly part of a continuous SH-5 across Southwest Oklahoma. From 1958 to 1969, SH-5 continued east from Eldorado over an unpaved roadway to a junction with US-283 east of Elmer, and then turned north on a route shared with US-283 to the current west terminus of the eastern SH-5 at its junction with US-283 south of Altus and west of Tipton and continued east over the current eastern SH-5. The former Eldorado to Elmer section of SH-5 was removed from the state highway system in 1969 and continues in use as a county road under the jurisdiction of Jackson County.

=== Eastern section ===
The eastern SH-5 starts between Altus and Elmer at US-283. It heads east from here to Tipton, where it turn south and SH-5C splits off. South of Tipton, SH-5 turns east again to intersect U.S. Highway 183 in Frederick. 19 miles (31 km) later, it has a two-mile (3.2 km) concurrency with State Highway 36. The highway splits off to the east from here, sharing a three-mile (4.8 km) concurrency with US-277/281 and an interchange with Interstate 44 (which is also the Walters toll plaza of the H.E. Bailey Turnpike).

Five miles (8 km) east of where this three-route concurrency breaks up, SH-5 turns south in Walters, with the mainline being taken over by State Highway 53. SH-5 heads east again toward Temple, where it has a brief concurrency with State Highway 65, and then turns southeast to pass through Hastings before ending at US-70 in Waurika.

== Spurs ==
SH-5 has three lettered spur routes.

- SH-5A connects SH-5 south of Walters to US-277/281 south of Cookietown.
- SH-5B does not connect directly with SH-5. It runs from SH-5A south to US-70 at Taylor.
- SH-5C runs from SH-5 at Tipton to US-183 in Manitou.

== Junction list ==
=== Western section ===
County	Location	mi	km	Destinations	Notes
Harmon	Gould	0.00	0.00	US 62	Western terminus
Jackson	Eldorado	20.42	32.86	SH-6	Eastern terminus
1.000 mi = 1.609 km; 1.000 km = 0.621 mi

=== Eastern section ===
County	Location	mi	km	Destinations	Notes
Jackson		0.0	0.0	US 283	Western terminus
Tillman	Tipton	11.5	18.5	SH-5C	Western terminus of SH-5C
Tillman	Frederick	25.9	41.7	US 183	
Tillman		34.2	55.0	SH-54	Northern terminus of SH-54
Tillman		45.1	72.6	SH-36	Northern end of SH-36 concurrency
Tillman		46.8	75.3	SH-36	Southern end of SH-36 concurrency
Cotton		60.2	96.9	US 277 / US 281	Western end of US-277 / US-281 concurrency
Cotton		62.6	100.7	I-44 / H.E. Bailey Turnpike	I-44 exit 20
Cotton		63.1	101.5	US 277 / US 281	Eastern end of US-277 / US-281 concurrency
Cotton	Walters	68.1	109.6	SH-53	Western terminus of SH-53
Cotton		74.1	119.3	SH-5A	Eastern terminus of SH-5A
Cotton	Temple	78.1	125.7	SH-65	Western end of SH-65 concurrency
Cotton	Temple	78.6	126.5	SH-65	Eastern end of SH-65 concurrency
Jefferson	Waurika	98.2	158.0	US 70	Eastern terminus
1.000 mi = 1.609 km; 1.000 km = 0.621 mi: Concurrency terminus
