= Hulen, Oklahoma =

Community in the U.S. state of Oklahoma

Coordinates: 34°30′14″N 98°13′17″W

Hulen is an unincorporated community in northeast Cotton County, Oklahoma, United States. The community is just south of the Cotton-Comanche county line on Oklahoma State Highway 65 15 miles north of Temple. Lawton is approximately 12 miles to the northwest. The community is at an elevation of 1,083 feet.

The town is old enough to appear on a 1911 Rand McNally map of the county.
