= Hillbilly Handfishin' =

Television reality show about noodling

- Starring: Skipper Bivins; Trent Jackson
- Country of origin: United States
- Original language: English
- No. of seasons: 2
- No. of episodes: 28

Production
- Executive producers: Abby Greensfelder; Sean Gallagher
- Production location: Temple, Oklahoma
- Running time: 60 minutes
- Production company: Half Yard Productions

Original release
- Network: Animal Planet
- Release: August 7, 2011 – August 5, 2013

Hillbilly Handfishin' is an American reality television show about noodling, the sport of fishing for catfish using only bare hands and feet. The series aired on Animal Planet from August 7, 2011 to August 5, 2013.

The show starred Oklahoma fishermen Skipper Bivins and Trent Jackson, self-proclaimed "hillbillies" who take tourists from cities on noodling expeditions in muddy lakes, rivers and streams. The Bivins family runs Big Fish Adventures, a noodling-exhibition company based in Temple, Oklahoma.

Although officially set to premiere in August 2011, a pilot for the series first premiered on Animal Planet on September 24, 2010. At the time, it averaged 630,000 viewers, which was 44 percent better than the timeslot average at the time. Subsequent encores of the pilot on December 9 and December 22 drew viewerships of 653,000 and 722,000, respectively.

Before the series premiered, Field & Stream magazine writer Chad Love criticized the premise and concept of the show, expressing particular concern that it would portray Oklahoma and its residents in a stereotypical and negative light. Love wrote, "Here's one from the 'Do We Really Need A Reality Show For This?' files."

Episode 2 featured three pairs of participants, including Tony and Nick from Chicago, Ken and his daughter Natalie, and retirees Valerie and John. Episode 3 featured Hiliary and Kerry, a newlywed couple, Georgia friend Terisa and Tenia, and brothers-in-law Brad and Jim.
