= 1956 United States presidential election in Oklahoma =

- November 6, 1956

All 8 Oklahoma votes to the Electoral College

Nominee	Dwight D. Eisenhower	Adlai Stevenson
Party	Republican	Democratic
Home state	Pennsylvania	Illinois
Running mate	Richard Nixon	Estes Kefauver
Electoral vote	8	0
Popular vote	473,769	385,581
Percentage	55.13%	44.87%
County results
Eisenhower
50–60%
60–70%
70–80%
Stevenson
50–60%
60–70%
70–80%
President before election
Dwight D. Eisenhower
Republican
Elected President
Dwight D. Eisenhower
Republican

The 1956 United States presidential election in Oklahoma took place on November 6, 1956, as part of the 1956 United States presidential election. Voters chose eight representatives, or electors, to the Electoral College, who voted for president and vice president.

Oklahoma was won by incumbent President Dwight D. Eisenhower (R–Pennsylvania), running with Vice President Richard Nixon, with 55.13 percent of the popular vote, against Adlai Stevenson (D–Illinois), running with Senator Estes Kefauver, with 44.87 percent of the popular vote. As of 2024, this is the last time Oklahoma has voted more Democratic than the nation as a whole. This was the first time that a Republican carried Oklahoma twice or that the state voted Republican in back-to-back elections.

== Results ==
1956 United States presidential election in Oklahoma
Party	Candidate	Votes	%
Republican	Dwight D. Eisenhower (inc.)	473,769	55.13%
Democratic	Adlai Stevenson	385,581	44.87%
Total votes		859,350	100%

=== Results by county ===
County	Dwight D. Eisenhower Republican		Adlai Stevenson Democratic		Margin		Total votes cast
County	#	%	#	%	#	%	Total votes cast
Adair	3,152	56.59%	2,418	43.41%	734	13.18%	5,570
Alfalfa	3,251	70.34%	1,371	29.66%	1,880	40.68%	4,622
Atoka	1,731	41.66%	2,424	58.34%	-693	-16.68%	4,155
Beaver	2,046	68.38%	946	31.62%	1,100	36.76%	2,992
Beckham	3,194	47.28%	3,561	52.72%	-367	-5.44%	6,755
Blaine	3,855	67.64%	1,844	32.36%	2,011	35.28%	5,699
Bryan	2,939	33.91%	5,729	66.09%	-2,790	-32.18%	8,668
Caddo	5,331	47.53%	5,884	52.47%	-553	-4.94%	11,215
Canadian	5,702	59.41%	3,896	40.59%	1,806	18.82%	9,598
Carter	5,974	39.01%	9,341	60.99%	-3,367	-21.98%	15,315
Cherokee	3,277	52.28%	2,991	47.72%	286	4.56%	6,268
Choctaw	2,206	38.87%	3,469	61.13%	-1,263	-22.26%	5,675
Cimarron	1,053	56.46%	812	43.54%	241	12.92%	1,865
Cleveland	7,766	56.47%	5,987	43.53%	1,779	12.94%	13,753
Coal	920	36.57%	1,596	63.43%	-676	-26.86%	2,516
Comanche	7,532	46.24%	8,756	53.76%	-1,224	-7.52%	16,288
Cotton	1,398	42.53%	1,889	57.47%	-491	-14.94%	3,287
Craig	3,543	53.29%	3,106	46.71%	437	6.58%	6,649
Creek	8,295	53.87%	7,102	46.13%	1,193	7.74%	15,397
Custer	4,182	58.02%	3,026	41.98%	1,156	16.04%	7,208
Delaware	3,078	53.47%	2,679	46.53%	399	6.94%	5,757
Dewey	1,896	56.70%	1,448	43.30%	448	13.40%	3,344
Ellis	1,916	67.56%	920	32.44%	996	35.12%	2,836
Garfield	15,348	69.39%	6,769	30.61%	8,579	38.78%	22,117
Garvin	3,850	37.38%	6,451	62.62%	-2,601	-25.24%	10,301
Grady	5,191	43.39%	6,773	56.61%	-1,582	-13.22%	11,964
Grant	2,788	58.81%	1,953	41.19%	835	17.62%	4,741
Greer	1,499	44.01%	1,907	55.99%	-408	-11.98%	3,406
Harmon	837	32.44%	1,743	67.56%	-906	-35.12%	2,580
Harper	1,596	68.44%	736	31.56%	860	36.88%	2,332
Haskell	1,758	42.47%	2,381	57.53%	-623	-15.06%	4,139
Hughes	2,783	39.41%	4,278	60.59%	-1,495	-21.18%	7,061
Jackson	2,343	34.57%	4,435	65.43%	-2,092	-30.86%	6,778
Jefferson	1,186	31.84%	2,539	68.16%	-1,353	-36.32%	3,725
Johnston	1,157	34.14%	2,232	65.86%	-1,075	-31.72%	3,389
Kay	14,837	64.77%	8,071	35.23%	6,766	29.54%	22,908
Kingfisher	3,935	70.23%	1,668	29.77%	2,267	40.46%	5,603
Kiowa	2,713	44.59%	3,371	55.41%	-658	-10.82%	6,084
Latimer	1,387	41.02%	1,994	58.98%	-607	-17.96%	3,381
LeFlore	4,310	44.96%	5,276	55.04%	-966	-10.08%	9,586
Lincoln	4,993	56.09%	3,909	43.91%	1,084	12.18%	8,902
Logan	5,326	64.94%	2,875	35.06%	2,451	29.88%	8,201
Love	731	29.39%	1,756	70.61%	-1,025	-41.22%	2,487
Major	2,826	74.82%	951	25.18%	1,875	49.64%	3,777
Marshall	1,151	35.40%	2,100	64.60%	-949	-29.20%	3,251
Mayes	4,677	55.43%	3,760	44.57%	917	10.86%	8,437
McClain	2,081	41.11%	2,981	58.89%	-900	-17.78%	5,062
McCurtain	2,707	36.25%	4,761	63.75%	-2,054	-27.50%	7,468
McIntosh	2,149	44.06%	2,728	55.94%	-579	-11.88%	4,877
Murray	1,809	42.16%	2,482	57.84%	-673	-15.68%	4,291
Muskogee	11,057	51.50%	10,413	48.50%	644	3.00%	21,470
Noble	3,536	63.68%	2,017	36.32%	1,519	27.36%	5,553
Nowata	3,168	58.28%	2,268	41.72%	900	16.56%	5,436
Okfuskee	2,299	49.65%	2,331	50.35%	-32	-0.70%	4,630
Oklahoma	85,395	59.76%	57,512	40.24%	27,883	19.52%	142,907
Okmulgee	6,703	46.78%	7,626	53.22%	-923	-6.44%	14,329
Osage	7,296	55.13%	5,939	44.87%	1,357	10.26%	13,235
Ottawa	6,730	54.05%	5,721	45.95%	1,009	8.10%	12,451
Pawnee	3,390	59.96%	2,264	40.04%	1,126	19.92%	5,654
Payne	9,381	59.75%	6,320	40.25%	3,061	19.50%	15,701
Pittsburg	5,239	38.46%	8,382	61.54%	-3,143	-23.08%	13,621
Pontotoc	4,814	44.72%	5,950	55.28%	-1,136	-10.56%	10,764
Pottawatomie	8,496	48.85%	8,895	51.15%	-399	-2.30%	17,391
Pushmataha	1,499	39.74%	2,273	60.26%	-774	-20.52%	3,772
Roger Mills	1,072	43.95%	1,367	56.05%	-295	-12.10%	2,439
Rogers	4,487	58.49%	3,185	41.51%	1,302	16.98%	7,672
Seminole	5,230	47.00%	5,897	53.00%	-667	-6.00%	11,127
Sequoyah	3,330	48.33%	3,560	51.67%	-230	-3.34%	6,890
Stephens	6,324	45.67%	7,524	54.33%	-1,200	-8.66%	13,848
Texas	3,320	63.77%	1,886	36.23%	1,434	27.54%	5,206
Tillman	1,810	34.97%	3,366	65.03%	-1,556	-30.06%	5,176
Tulsa	83,219	65.51%	43,805	34.49%	39,414	31.02%	127,024
Wagoner	3,537	58.16%	2,544	41.84%	993	16.32%	6,081
Washington	12,488	69.31%	5,529	30.69%	6,959	38.62%	18,017
Washita	2,552	44.44%	3,191	55.56%	-639	-11.12%	5,743
Woods	3,787	64.08%	2,123	35.92%	1,664	28.16%	5,910
Woodward	3,405	67.79%	1,618	32.21%	1,787	35.58%	5,023
Totals	473,769	55.13%	385,581	44.87%	88,188	10.26%	859,350

==== Counties that flipped Republican to Democratic ====
- Beckham
- Caddo
- Kiowa
- Pottawatomie
- Roger Mills
- Washita

==== Counties that flipped Democratic to Republican ====
- Muskogee

== See also ==
- United States presidential elections in Oklahoma
