= H. E. Bailey =

Oklahoman politician

Harold Eugene Bailey (November 12, 1900 – October 25, 1976) was an American politician in the state of Oklahoma who was instrumental in the growth of the Oklahoma turnpike system.

== Career ==
Bailey served as State Highway Commissioner beginning on January 17, 1939, alongside George Meacham and Sandy Singleton.

After the resignation of W. A. Quinn, Bailey assumed the office of city manager of Oklahoma City on February 11, 1941. Bailey was an opponent of the unionization of the Oklahoma City Police Department. In November 1941, officers from Tulsa attempted to assist OCPD officers in forming their own chapter of the Fraternal Order of Police. After being told by Bailey that such an attempt would lead to their firing, the officers disbanded. In early 1943, eighty OCPD officers again attempted to unionize; Bailey fired eight officers and the others quickly disbanded once again. During his tenure, Bailey was responsible for the $14 million appropriation used to construct Tinker Air Force Base, and also oversaw the construction of Wiley Post Airport.

Bailey left the city manager position on February 1, 1944, and the following day he became Chief Engineer of the Oklahoma Highway Department. He then served as Director of the State Highway Department beginning on March 12, 1947.

Bailey became the General Manager of the Oklahoma Turnpike Authority on January 13, 1951. In this role, he oversaw the construction of the Turner Turnpike.

== Death and legacy ==
Bailey died from a heart attack on October 25, 1976, at the age of 75. Bailey is the namesake of the H. E. Bailey Turnpike, which connects Oklahoma City to Lawton and is now part of Interstate 44.
