= First United Methodist Church (Walters, Oklahoma) =

Historic church in Oklahoma, United States

- U.S. National Register of Historic Places
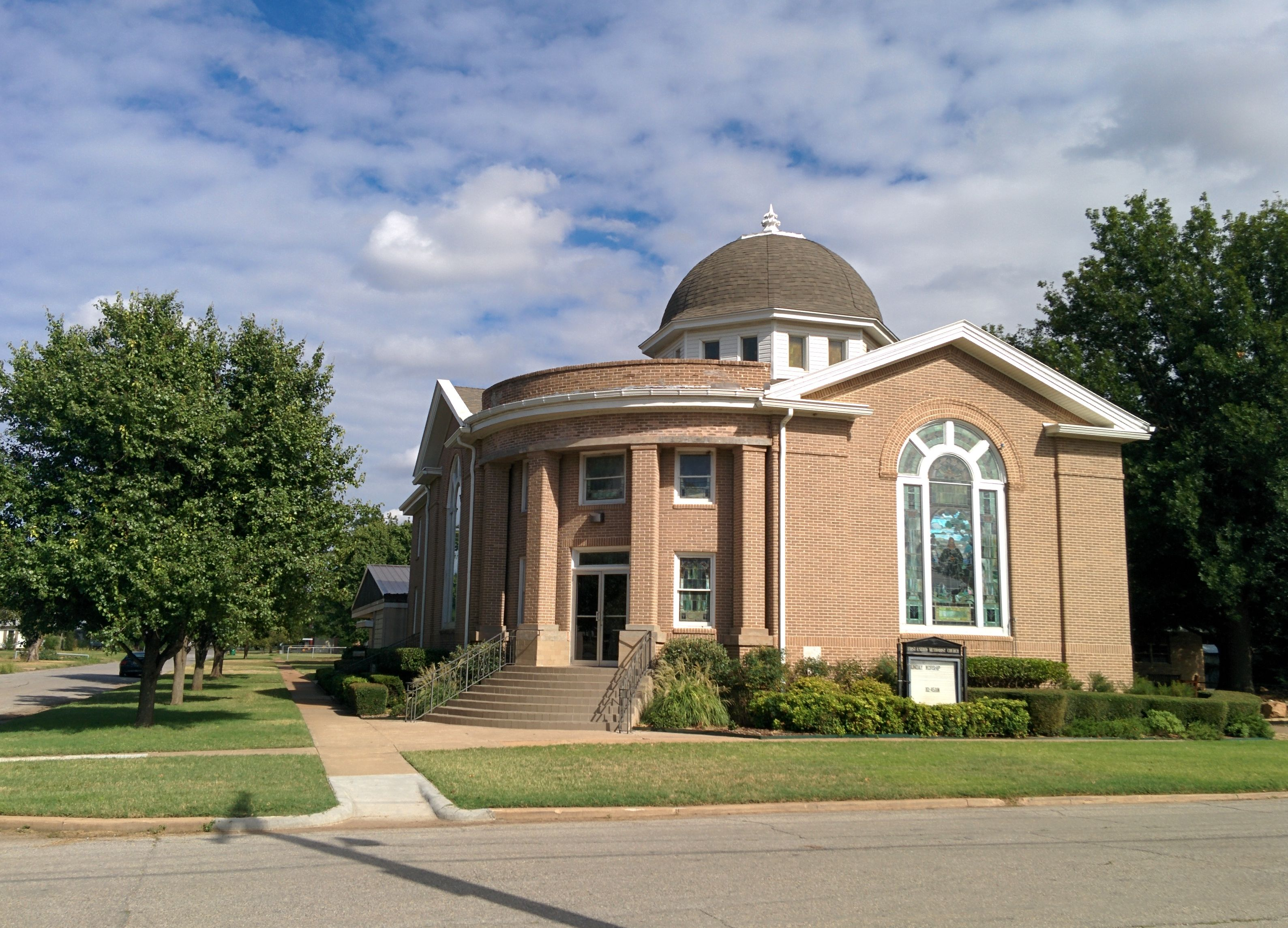

- Location within Oklahoma Location within the United States
- Location: 202 E. Oklahoma, Walters, Oklahoma
- Coordinates: 34°21′35″N 98°18′26″W
- Area: less than one acre
- Built: 1917
- Architectural style: Romanesque
- NRHP reference No.: 83002082
- Added to NRHP: September 15, 1983

First United Methodist Church is a historic church at 202 E. Oklahoma in Walters, Oklahoma.

The church was built in 1917 at a cost of $15,000. Handmade bricks from local clay were used, and members of the church congregation volunteered to work on the building. It is the only building in Cotton County, Oklahoma that includes major elements of the Romanesque Revival style and incorporates a large dome at its center. According to the national register submission form, it is the best example of this architecture style in southwestern Oklahoma. It was added to the National Register in 1983. The layout of the school area follows the Akron Plan.
