= Oklahoma State Highway 109 =

State highway in Oklahoma, United States

State Highway 109
- SH-109 highlighted in red

Route information
- Maintained by ODOT
- Length: 53.9 mi (86.7 km)
- Existed: 1957–present

Major junctions
- West end: US 70 in Boswell
- US 271 from Grant to Ord
- East end: US 70 in Fort Towson

Location
- Country: United States
- State: Oklahoma

Highway system
- Oklahoma State Highway System; Interstate; US; State; Turnpikes
← SH-108	→ SH-110

State Highway 109 (abbreviated SH-109 or OK-109) is a 54 mile (87 km) long state highway in southern Oklahoma. It runs through southern Choctaw County, connecting to US-70 at each end. It has no lettered spur routes.

== Route description ==
The highway begins heading southbound from US-70 at Boswell. It turns westbound after about 5 miles (8 km). As it approaches the Red River, it turns back northward and then eastward again to run through unincorporated Gay, 24 miles (38.6 km) into the route. Six miles (9.65 km) later, it meets U.S. Highway 271 and has a concurrency with it lasting about 4 miles (6.4 km), splitting off near Ord. Between Frogville and Huskey it turns back north before ending at US-70 near Fort Towson.

== History ==
SH-109 originally ran from Fort Towson to Raymond Gary State Park. However, on 1957-04-23 it was redesignated to run from Boswell to Fort Towson. It was realigned several times in the 1960s and once in 1982. Since 1982, the route has remained unchanged.

== Junction list ==
The entire route is in Choctaw County.

Location	mi	km	Destinations	Notes
Boswell	0.0	0.0	US-70	Western terminus
	29.6	47.6	US-271	Northern end of US-271 concurrency
Ord	33.8	54.4	US-271	Southern end of US-271 concurrency
Fort Towson	53.9	86.7	US-70	Eastern terminus
1.000 mi = 1.609 km; 1.000 km = 0.621 mi: Concurrency terminus
