= Cookietown, Oklahoma =

Unincorporated community in Oklahoma, US

- Unincorporated community
- Location within the state of Oklahoma Cookietown (the United States)
- Coordinates: 34°16′30″N 98°27′12″W
- Country: United States
- State: Oklahoma
- County: Cotton
- Elevation: 1,034 ft (315 m)
- Time zone: UTC-6 (Central (CST))
  - Summer (DST): UTC-5 (CDT)
- GNIS feature ID: 1100316

Cookietown is a small unincorporated community in Cotton County, Oklahoma, United States. It is located less than 15 driving miles southwest of the county seat of Walters, and is situated just off US Route 277 near its intersection with Oklahoma State Highway 5A.

== History ==
Cookietown was named for a mercantile at the crossroads owned by Marvin Cornelius, circa 1928. The storeowner was noted for giving cookies to children.
