= Hooper, Oklahoma =

Unincorporated community in Oklahoma, US

Coordinates: 34°09′33″N 98°10′26″W

Hooper is an unincorporated community in southeast Cotton County, Oklahoma, United States. The community is on US Route 70 approximately nine miles west of Waurika in adjacent Jefferson County and three miles north of the Red River and the Texas border. It is at an elevation of 942 feet.
