= Cotton County, Oklahoma =

County in Oklahoma, United States

- County
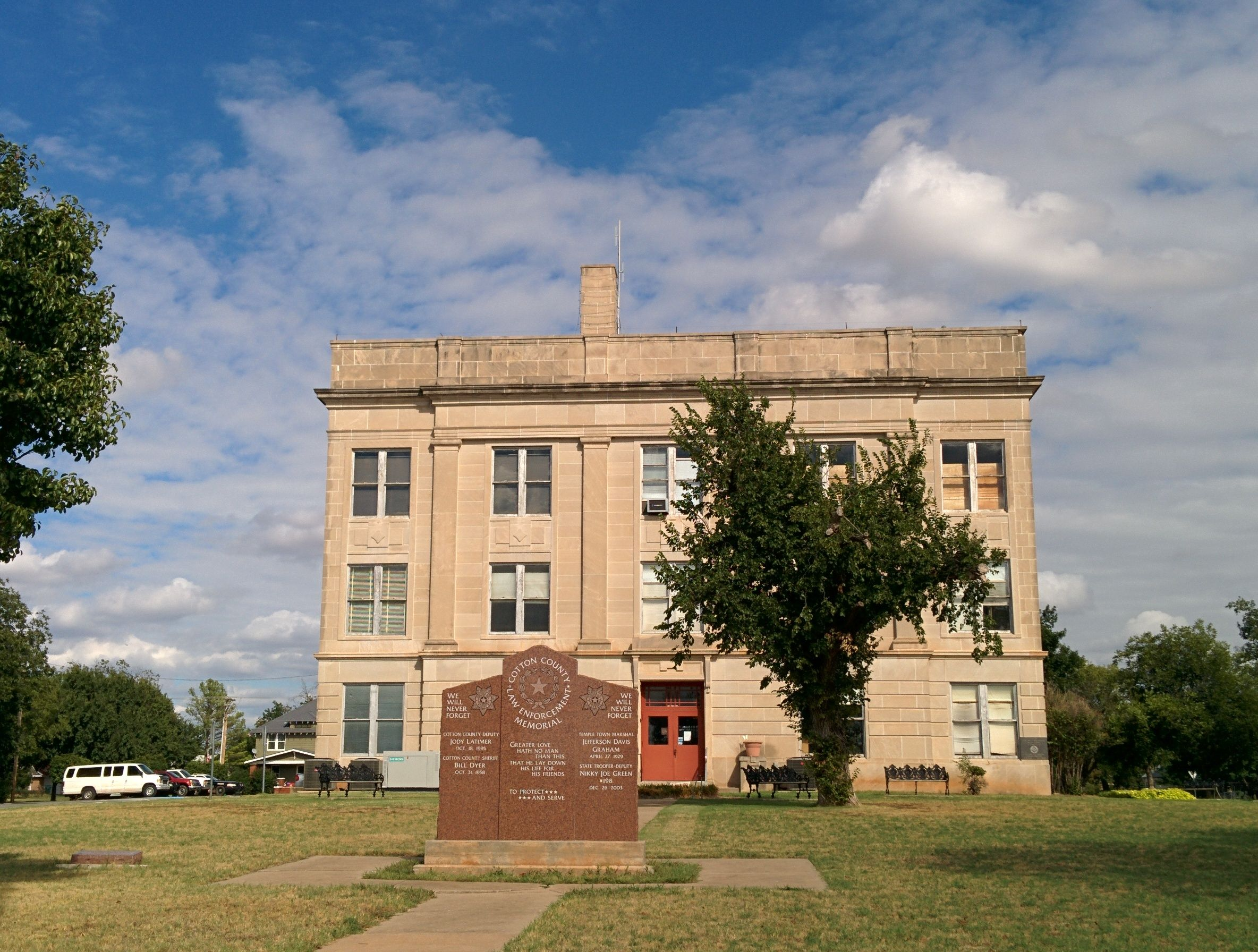
- Cotton County Courthouse in September 2014

- Location within the U.S. state of Oklahoma
- Coordinates: 34°17′N 98°22′W
- Country: United States
- State: Oklahoma
- Founded: 1912
- Seat: Walters
- Largest city: Walters

Area
  - Total: 642 sq mi (1,660 km^{2})
  - Land: 633 sq mi (1,640 km^{2})
  - Water: 9.3 sq mi (24 km^{2}) 1.4%

Population (2020)
  - Total: 5,527
  - Estimate (2025): 5,432 ▼
  - Density: 8.73/sq mi (3.37/km^{2})
- Time zone: UTC−6 (Central)
  - Summer (DST): UTC−5 (CDT)
- Congressional district: 4th
- Website: https://cottoncountyokguide.com/

Cotton County is a county located in the U.S. state of Oklahoma. As of the 2020 census, the population was 5,527. Its county seat is Walters. When Oklahoma achieved statehood in 1907, the area which is now Cotton County fell within the boundaries of Comanche County. It was split off in 1912, becoming the last county created in Oklahoma; it was named for the county's primary crop.

Cotton County is included in the Lawton, Oklahoma metropolitan area.

== History ==
The eastern part of what is now Cotton County was opened to settlement by non-Native Americans by the 1901 Kiowa-Comanche-Apache Opening, which distributed land by a lottery system. In 1906, the remainder of the present county, then known as the Big Pasture was opened through a sealed bid process. Most of this territory became part of Comanche County at statehood in 1907.

In 1910, residents of the present Cotton County area tried to form a new county, named "Swanson County," but this effort failed in 1911. Another effort in 1912 succeeded. This time, residents elected to split from Comanche County and name the new county "Cotton County," for the primary crop in the region at the time. Randlett, Oklahoma was assigned as a temporary county seat, until a November 4, 1912, election made Walters, Oklahoma the permanent location.

Wheat became more prevalent than, and corn just as prevalent as, cotton as early as 1915. In 1934, corn had dwindled and winter wheat, cotton and oats had become the primary crops.

The county population has generally declined since 1920. In 1920, the population was 16,679. In 1930, it was 15,542. There was a brief increase in the late 1900s, but decline resumed in the 21st century.

== Geography ==
According to the U.S. Census Bureau, the county has a total area of 642 square miles (1,660 km^{2}), of which 633 square miles (1,640 km^{2}) is land and 9.3 square miles (24 km^{2}) (1.4%) is water.

The eastern portion of the county is in the Cross Timbers region. Its creeks and streams drain to the southeast into the Red River, which borders the county on the south.

=== Major highways ===
- Interstate 44
- H.E. Bailey Turnpike
- U.S. Highway 70
- U.S. Highway 277
- U.S. Highway 281
- State Highway 5
- State Highway 36
- State Highway 53
- State Highway 65

=== Adjacent counties ===
- Comanche County (north)
- Stephens County (northeast)
- Jefferson County (southeast)
- Clay County, Texas (south)
- Wichita County, Texas (southwest)
- Tillman County (west)

== Demographics ==
Historical population
Census	Pop.	Note	%±
1920	16,679		—
1930	15,442		−7.4%
1940	12,884		−16.6%
1950	10,180		−21.0%
1960	8,031		−21.1%
1970	6,832		−14.9%
1980	7,338		7.4%
1990	6,651		−9.4%
2000	6,614		−0.6%
2010	6,193		−6.4%
2020	5,527		−10.8%
2025 (est.)	5,432	▼	−1.7%
U.S. Decennial Census; 1790-1960 1900-1990; 1990-2000 2010

The county's population has generally declined since it stood at 16,679 in 1920.

=== 2020 census ===
As of the 2020 United States census, the county had a population of 5,527. Of the residents, 23.7% were under the age of 18 and 20.8% were 65 years of age or older; the median age was 43.0 years. For every 100 females there were 97.1 males, and for every 100 females age 18 and over there were 95.7 males.

The racial makeup of the county was 76.2% White, 1.4% Black or African American, 9.6% American Indian and Alaska Native, 0.5% Asian, 1.7% from some other race, and 10.5% from two or more races. Hispanic or Latino residents of any race comprised 6.5% of the population.

There were 2,207 households in the county, of which 32.2% had children under the age of 18 living with them and 24.2% had a female householder with no spouse or partner present. About 25.3% of all households were made up of individuals and 12.7% had someone living alone who was 65 years of age or older.

There were 2,689 housing units, of which 17.9% were vacant. Among occupied housing units, 75.1% were owner-occupied and 24.9% were renter-occupied. The homeowner vacancy rate was 2.6% and the rental vacancy rate was 10.3%.

=== 2000 census ===
As of the census of 2000, there were 6,614 people, 2,614 households, and 1,840 families residing in the county. The population density was 10 people per square mile (3.9 people/km^{2}). There were 3,085 housing units at an average density of 5 units per square mile (1.9/km^{2}). The racial makeup of the county was 84.70% White, 2.86% Black or African American, 7.42% Native American, 0.12% Asian, 0.03% Pacific Islander, 1.81% from other races, and 3.05% from two or more races. 4.85% of the population were Hispanic or Latino of any race.

There were 2,614 households, out of which 31.30% had children under the age of 18 living with them, 57.60% were married couples living together, 9.70% had a female householder with no husband present, and 29.60% were non-families. 27.30% of all households were made up of individuals, and 14.90% had someone living alone who was 65 years of age or older. The average household size was 2.46 and the average family size was 3.00.

In the county, the population was spread out, with 25.40% under the age of 18, 7.40% from 18 to 24, 26.70% from 25 to 44, 22.80% from 45 to 64, and 17.80% who were 65 years of age or older. The median age was 39 years. For every 100 females there were 98.60 males. For every 100 females age 18 and over, there were 94.60 males.

The median income for a household in the county was $27,210, and the median income for a family was $35,129. Males had a median income of $28,443 versus $19,101 for females. The per capita income for the county was $14,626. About 13.70% of families and 18.20% of the population were below the poverty line, including 24.40% of those under age 18 and 16.90% of those age 65 or over.

== Politics ==
Voter Registration and Party Enrollment as of June 30, 2023
Party	Number of Voters	Percentage
Democratic	1,020	27.60%
Republican	2,237	60.52%
Others	439	11.88%
Total	3,696	100%

United States presidential election results for Cotton County, Oklahoma
Year	Republican		Democratic		Third party(ies)	
Year	No.	%	No.	%	No.	%
1912	587	30.23%	1,063	54.74%	292	15.04%
1916	685	26.81%	1,500	58.71%	370	14.48%
1920	1,820	42.80%	2,260	53.15%	172	4.05%
1924	1,581	42.67%	1,825	49.26%	299	8.07%
1928	2,419	59.76%	1,605	39.65%	24	0.59%
1932	758	14.62%	4,426	85.38%	0	0.00%
1936	1,181	23.43%	3,842	76.23%	17	0.34%
1940	1,616	33.95%	3,121	65.57%	23	0.48%
1944	1,266	31.70%	2,711	67.88%	17	0.43%
1948	738	22.02%	2,613	77.98%	0	0.00%
1952	1,897	47.26%	2,117	52.74%	0	0.00%
1956	1,398	42.53%	1,889	57.47%	0	0.00%
1960	1,619	49.77%	1,634	50.23%	0	0.00%
1964	1,123	33.63%	2,216	66.37%	0	0.00%
1968	1,016	32.64%	1,192	38.29%	905	29.07%
1972	2,050	70.23%	798	27.34%	71	2.43%
1976	1,127	36.78%	1,911	62.37%	26	0.85%
1980	1,702	53.09%	1,410	43.98%	94	2.93%
1984	1,796	58.31%	1,264	41.04%	20	0.65%
1988	1,266	45.62%	1,482	53.41%	27	0.97%
1992	910	29.44%	1,314	42.51%	867	28.05%
1996	1,042	38.62%	1,258	46.63%	398	14.75%
2000	1,388	55.92%	1,068	43.03%	26	1.05%
2004	1,742	65.98%	898	34.02%	0	0.00%
2008	1,793	72.21%	690	27.79%	0	0.00%
2012	1,796	73.22%	657	26.78%	0	0.00%
2016	2,054	78.94%	424	16.30%	124	4.77%
2020	2,117	82.31%	393	15.28%	62	2.41%
2024	2,067	82.48%	392	15.64%	47	1.88%

== Economy ==
The county's economy has long revolved around agriculture, specifically crops such as cotton and wheat and livestock such as cattle and poultry. Beginning in the late 1910s, oil and gas grew as a strong industry, the county had 290 producing wells in 1920, 32 of which were gas. The southern portion of the county had Devol refineries, pumping stations, and pipelines. A large retail outlet, Temple's B & O Cash Store, shipped merchandise nationwide, before being bought by Sears and Roebuck in 1929 and later closed in 1954.

In 1997 the county held 69,988 cattle and ranked eleventh in the state for poultry sold.

== Communities ==
=== City ===
- Walters (county seat)

=== Towns ===
- Devol
- Randlett
- Temple

=== Unincorporated communities ===
- Ahpeatone
- Cookietown
- Fivemile Corner
- Hooper
- Hulen
- Taylor

== In popular culture ==
Cotton County is the main setting for the Animal Planet documentary series Hillbilly Handfishin'.

== See also ==
- National Register of Historic Places listings in Cotton County, Oklahoma
