= Frogville, Oklahoma =

Unincorporated community in Oklahoma, US

- Unincorporated community
- Location within the state of Oklahoma Frogville (the United States)
- Coordinates: 33°53′51″N 95°18′46″W
- Country: United States
- State: Oklahoma
- County: Choctaw
- Elevation: 400 ft (122 m)
- Time zone: UTC-6 (Central (CST))
  - Summer (DST): UTC-5 (CDT)
- ZIP codes: 74743
- GNIS feature ID: 1100435

Frogville is a small unincorporated community in Choctaw County, Oklahoma, United States. The post office was established on October 29, 1897, and closed on August 15, 1933. Frogville was named for the abundance of frogs in the area said to be so large they ate young ducks.

== History ==
A post office was established at Frogville, Indian Territory on October 29, 1897. It took its name from area frogs, which were said to be so plentiful they reputedly "ate young ducks." The post office closed on August 15, 1933.

At the time of its founding, Frogville was located in Kiamitia County, a part of the Apukshunnubbee District of the Choctaw Nation.

Frogville, at its peak, was home to 40 families, a post office, several stores, a school, and a church.

== Geography ==
Frogville is located around a mile from the Red River, which separates Oklahoma and Texas. Frogville is in southeastern Choctaw County 18 miles (29 km) southeast of Hugo, the county seat. Sawyer is 12 miles (19 km) to the north-northwest, Fort Towson is 11 miles (18 km) to the north-northeast, and Grant is 14 miles (23 km) to the west. Frogville is located in the 74743 (Hugo) ZIP code.

The closest school to Frogville is the Kiamichi Technology Center, serving the Hugo area for the purpose of higher education (Mandevill). The schools that would be available to Frogville are Hugo Elementary School 1100 David Roebuck Lane, Hugo Middle School 300 North E., Hugo High School 201 E. Brown (Henry), Fort Towson Elementary West 3rd Street, and Fort Towson High School West 3rd Street (Mandevill).

Oklahoma is a mostly farming state and most all of Frogville property is farmland (Smallwood). The closest post office is in Sawyer (ZIP code 74756).

In the town of Frogville there are two reservoirs, one cemetery, and the only major highway that is used to reach Frogville is Oklahoma State Highway 109 (Google Maps).
