= Davidson, Oklahoma =

- Town
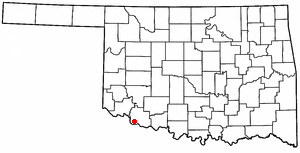
- Location of Davidson, Oklahoma
- Coordinates: 34°14′32″N 99°04′41″W
- Country: United States
- State: Oklahoma
- County: Tillman

Area
  - Total: 0.48 sq mi (1.25 km^{2})
  - Land: 0.48 sq mi (1.25 km^{2})
  - Water: 0 sq mi (0.00 km^{2})
- Elevation: 1,168 ft (356 m)

Population (2020)
  - Total: 241
  - Density: 500.7/sq mi (193.33/km^{2})
- Time zone: UTC-6 (Central (CST))
  - Summer (DST): UTC-5 (CDT)
- ZIP code: 73530
- Area code: 580
- FIPS code: 40-19400
- GNIS feature ID: 2412408

Davidson is a town in Tillman County, Oklahoma, United States. The population was 241 at the 2020 Census.

== History ==
This area was opened for homesteading by a lottery held in 1901, and the St. Louis and San Francisco Railway promptly built a line in from Texas. A post office called Olds was established at the location on May 21, 1902; the name was changed to Davidson on June 20, 1903, named in honor of A. J. Davidson, a railroad director. The city government was not formally organized until 1916.

Agriculture was a major employer from the start, and at one time the town had five cotton gins and three grain elevators. Over the years the town had a full range of services, including movie theaters, newspapers, saloons, livery stables, blacksmiths, cafes, bakeries, and drug stores. But through the decades the population declined and many businesses closed. Agriculture has remained as the area’s economic base, and a local cooperative operates the one remaining grain elevator.

The town experienced a minor flood in 1995.

== Geography ==
Davidson is located at the junction of U.S. routes 70 and 183 in the southwestern part of Tillman County.

Hackberry Flat Wildlife Management Area, roughly 11 miles east-northeast of Davidson, is a restored wetlands habitat which forms a managed location for both wildlife and recreation. It encompasses 7,120 acres including 3,500 acres for flooding, 100 water control structures, and a 17-mile pipeline to bring water from Tom Steed Reservoir as needed.

According to the United States Census Bureau, the town has a total area of 0.5 square miles (1.3 km^{2}), all land.

== Demographics ==
Historical population
| Census | Pop. | Note | %± |
|---|---|---|---|
| 1910 | 361 | | — |
| 1920 | 461 | | 27.7% |
| 1930 | 572 | | 24.1% |
| 1940 | 507 | | −11.4% |
| 1950 | 490 | | −3.4% |
| 1960 | 429 | | −12.4% |
| 1970 | 515 | | 20.0% |
| 1980 | 501 | | −2.7% |
| 1990 | 473 | | −5.6% |
| 2000 | 375 | | −20.7% |
| 2010 | 315 | | −16.0% |
| 2020 | 241 | | −23.5% |
U.S. Decennial Census

=== 2020 census ===
As of the 2020 census, Davidson had a population of 241. The median age was 50.1 years. 14.5% of residents were under the age of 18 and 24.5% of residents were 65 years of age or older. For every 100 females there were 109.6 males, and for every 100 females age 18 and over there were 112.4 males age 18 and over.

0.0% of residents lived in urban areas, while 100.0% lived in rural areas.

There were 107 households in Davidson, of which 25.2% had children under the age of 18 living in them. Of all households, 43.0% were married-couple households, 24.3% were households with a male householder and no spouse or partner present, and 28.0% were households with a female householder and no spouse or partner present. About 27.1% of all households were made up of individuals and 14.9% had someone living alone who was 65 years of age or older.

There were 139 housing units, of which 23.0% were vacant. The homeowner vacancy rate was 1.2% and the rental vacancy rate was 4.3%.

Racial composition as of the 2020 census
| Race | Number | Percent |
|---|---|---|
| White | 161 | 66.8% |
| Black or African American | 0 | 0.0% |
| American Indian and Alaska Native | 6 | 2.5% |
| Asian | 1 | 0.4% |
| Native Hawaiian and Other Pacific Islander | 0 | 0.0% |
| Some other race | 26 | 10.8% |
| Two or more races | 47 | 19.5% |
| Hispanic or Latino (of any race) | 85 | 35.3% |

=== 2000 census ===
As of the census of 2000, there were 375 people, 149 households, and 101 families residing in the town. The population density was 777.4 inhabitants per square mile (300.2/km^{2}). There were 181 housing units at an average density of 375.2 per square mile (144.9/km^{2}). The racial makeup of the town was 76.00% White, 1.33% African American, 2.40% Native American, 17.07% from other races, and 3.20% from two or more races. Hispanic or Latino of any race were 31.20% of the population.

There were 149 households, out of which 32.9% had children under the age of 18 living with them, 53.0% were married couples living together, 12.1% had a female householder with no husband present, and 32.2% were non-families. 30.2% of all households were made up of individuals, and 13.4% had someone living alone who was 65 years of age or older. The average household size was 2.52 and the average family size was 3.18.

In the town, the population was spread out, with 26.7% under the age of 18, 9.9% from 18 to 24, 25.1% from 25 to 44, 23.2% from 45 to 64, and 15.2% who were 65 years of age or older. The median age was 37 years. For every 100 females, there were 102.7 males. For every 100 females age 18 and over, there were 96.4 males.

The median income for a household in the town was $25,000, and the median income for a family was $35,208. Males had a median income of $25,156 versus $16,786 for females. The per capita income for the town was $12,679. About 19.6% of families and 24.1% of the population were below the poverty line, including 31.3% of those under age 18 and 20.0% of those age 65 or over.
