= Tillman County, Oklahoma =

County in Oklahoma, United States

- County
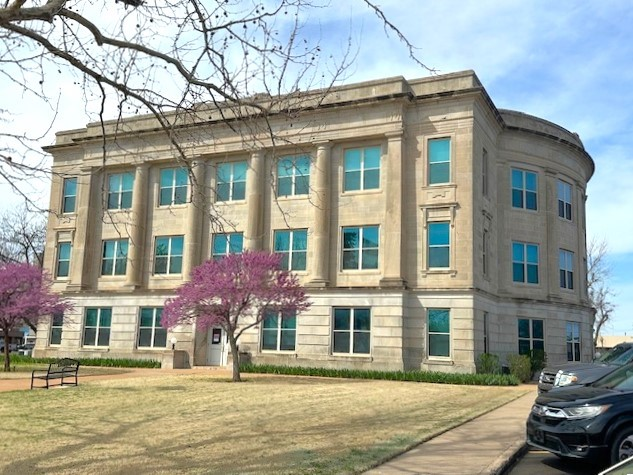
- Tillman County Courthouse in Frederick, March 2025

- Location within the U.S. state of Oklahoma
- Coordinates: 34°23′N 98°55′W
- Country: United States
- State: Oklahoma
- Founded: November 16, 1907
- Named for: Benjamin Tillman
- Seat: Frederick
- Largest city: Frederick

Area
  - Total: 879 sq mi (2,280 km^{2})
  - Land: 871 sq mi (2,260 km^{2})
  - Water: 8.1 sq mi (21 km^{2}) 0.9%

Population (2020)
  - Total: 6,968
  - Estimate (2025): 6,780 ▼
  - Density: 8.00/sq mi (3.09/km^{2})
- Time zone: UTC−6 (Central)
  - Summer (DST): UTC−5 (CDT)
- ZIP Codes: 73530, 73542, 73546, 73551, 73555, 73570
- Area code: 580
- Congressional district: 4th
- Website: tillman.okcounties.org

Tillman County is a county located in the southwestern part of Oklahoma, United States. As of the 2020 census, the population was 6,968. The county seat is Frederick. The county is named for former South Carolina governor and senator Benjamin Tillman, who had no relation to the county.

== History ==
=== Early history ===
The earliest signs of human settlement in Tillman County are believed to have come from the Clovis culture, a prehistoric culture that appeared in roughly 10,000 BC. Prehistoric settlement was sparse, and the area that is now Tillman County does not appear to have been especially populated. The Comanche people arrived in the area in the 14th to 15th century, although they too did not establish any major settlements in Tillman. While there is a possibility that Spanish and French explorers arrived in the area in the 1600s, no records remain.

In 1819, the United States, which had recently acquired the region as part of the Louisiana Purchase, settled a boundary with the Spanish Empire along the Red River of the South, Tillman County's southern border. The first major expedition to the area came in 1852, when captain Randolph B. Marcy set out to survey the river. Tillman and Southwest Oklahoma remained entirely unsettled and undisturbed throughout the American Civil War, after which negotiations involving the area began.

=== Founding and later history ===
The Medicine Lodge Treaty of 1867 established a reservation in the southwestern part of Indian Territory for the Kiowa, Apache and Comanche tribes. Following the opening of the Western Cattle Trail, which followed the county line between Jackson and Tillman counties, ranchers from Texas began to take note of the rich ranges of Tillman County, leasing much of the land from Native tribes that saw little use for the area themselves. The Jerome Commission started enrolling members of the tribes in 1892, a prerequisite to opening "excess" land for settlement by non-Indians. The first lottery was held on August 6, 1901. It was followed in 1906 by the "Big Pasture" Lottery. At the turn of the century, the Blackwell, Enid and Southwestern Railway was built through the county, further increasing its attractiveness. It was soon followed by the Frisco Railroad, which established a station around which the city of Frederick emerged, and later by the Katy Railroad, around which many of the smaller towns in the county emerged.

The county was founded at the time of Oklahoma statehood in 1907, and was named for Senator Benjamin Tillman of South Carolina. It had previously been part of Comanche County, Oklahoma Territory. Frederick was designated as the county seat at the time of statehood. In 1910 and 1924 portions of Kiowa County were added to the north side of the county. Since then, Tillman County has remained an agricultural county, and has struggled in recent years with the rural depopulation that affects much the rest of the country.

== Geography ==
According to the U.S. Census Bureau, the county has a total area of 879 square miles (2,280 km^{2}), of which 871 square miles (2,260 km^{2}) are land and 8.1 square miles (21 km^{2}) (0.9%) are covered by water. It is located along the Texas border.

=== Adjacent counties ===
- Kiowa County (north)
- Comanche County (northeast)
- Cotton County (east)
- Wichita County, Texas (south)
- Wilbarger County, Texas (southwest)
- Jackson County (northwest)

== Demographics ==
Historical population
Census	Pop.	Note	%±
1910	18,650		—
1920	22,433		20.3%
1930	24,390		8.7%
1940	20,754		−14.9%
1950	17,598		−15.2%
1960	14,654		−16.7%
1970	12,901		−12.0%
1980	12,398		−3.9%
1990	10,384		−16.2%
2000	9,287		−10.6%
2010	7,992		−13.9%
2020	6,968		−12.8%
2025 (est.)	6,780	▼	−2.7%
U.S. Decennial Census; 1790-1960 1900-1990; 1990-2000 2010

=== 2020 census ===
As of the 2020 census, the county had a population of 6,968. Of the residents, 24.5% were under the age of 18 and 20.7% were 65 years of age or older; the median age was 42.5 years. For every 100 females there were 100.5 males, and for every 100 females age 18 and over there were 98.4 males.

The racial makeup of the county was 65.4% White, 7.1% Black or African American, 3.5% American Indian and Alaska Native, 0.4% Asian, 11.5% from some other race, and 12.1% from two or more races. Hispanic or Latino residents of any race comprised 27.6% of the population.

There were 2,815 households in the county, of which 30.8% had children under the age of 18 living with them and 26.3% had a female householder with no spouse or partner present. About 29.1% of all households were made up of individuals and 15.2% had someone living alone who was 65 years of age or older.

There were 3,778 housing units, of which 25.5% were vacant. Among occupied housing units, 75.5% were owner-occupied and 24.5% were renter-occupied. The homeowner vacancy rate was 3.2% and the rental vacancy rate was 15.9%.

=== 2010 census ===
As of the 2010 United States census, there were 7,992 people, 3,216 households, and 2,136 families residing in the county. The population density was 3.5/km^{2} (9.1/mi^{2}). There were 4,077 housing units at an average density of 1.8/km^{2} (4.7/mi^{2}). The racial makeup of the county was 73.5% white, 7.7% Black or African American, 3.4% Native American, 0.3% Asian, less than 0.1% Pacific Islander, 11% from other races, and 4.1% from two or more races. Just over 23% of the population was Hispanic or Latino.

There were 3,216 households, out of which 31.5% included children under the age of 18, 48.8% were married couples living together, 12.3% had a female householder with no husband present, 5.3% had a male householder with no wife present, and 33.6% were non-families. Individuals living alone accounted for 30.3% of households and individuals age 65 years or older living alone accounted for 14%. The average household size was 2.4 and the average family size was 3.96.

In the county, the population was spread out, with 24.7% under the age of 18, 7.8% from 18 to 24, 22.5% from 25 to 44, 27.3% from 45 to 64, and 17.7% who were 65 years of age or older. The median age was 40.9 years. For every 100 females there were 99.8 males. For every 100 females age 18 and over, there were 99.6 males.

The median income for a household in the county was $31,437, and the median income for a family was $40,616. Males had a median income of $32,885 versus $29,757 for females. The per capita income for the county was $16,541. Sixteen percent of families and 21.7% of the population were below the poverty line, including 30.5% of those under age 18 and 12.1% of those age 65 or over.

== Economy ==
Since statehood, Tillman County's economy has depended mainly on agriculture, including the raising of livestock. The main farm crops are cotton, corn, wheat, oats, sorghum and milo (a variety of commercial sorghum). Many farms have consolidated throughout the 20th century, from 1,724 in 1930 to 587 in 2000; however, the average size increased from 188.8 acres (76.4 ha) to 819 acres (331 ha) during the same period.

Cattle ranching became prominent during the 1880s, when prominent Texas ranchers (principally Daniel and William Thomas Waggoner and Samuel Burk Burnett) leased grazing land from the Kiowa, Comanche, and Apache tribes.

The U.S. military established Frederick Army Air Field in 1941 to train crews to fly Cessna UC-78 Bobcats and North American B-25 Mitchells. After the war, the former base became a civilian airfield and is now known as Frederick Regional Airport.

== Culture and media ==
=== Culture ===
Despite its small size, Tillman County has several annual events and celebrations.

- The Tillman County Jr. Livestock Show, started in 1936, gathers students from 4-H and Future Farmers of America, and features a livestock judging event for swine, cattle, chickens, and various other forms of livestock.
- The Frederick Oyster Fry and Craft Show, started in 1952 and celebrated as a premier event for Southwest Oklahoma, usually includes a massive oyster fry and various arts and crafts vendors.
- The World War II Airborne Demonstration Team, started in 1996, is a volunteer parachutist team that reenacts World War II C-47 jumps semiannually at Frederick Regional Airport. The team occasionally provides training to active-duty soldiers at nearby Fort Sill.

=== Media ===
==== Newspapers ====
- The Frederick Press-Leader is the main local newspaper of record.

==== Television ====
- KJTL, a Wichita Falls, Texas-based FOX affiliate serving western Texoma.
- KSWO-TV, a Lawton-based ABC and Telemundo affiliate serving western Texoma.
- KAUZ-TV, a Wichita Falls, Texas-based CBS affiliate serving western Texoma.

== Government and politics ==
United States presidential election results for Tillman County, Oklahoma
Year	Republican		Democratic		Third party(ies)	
Year	No.	%	No.	%	No.	%
1908	732	29.09%	1,661	66.02%	123	4.89%
1912	638	22.70%	1,801	64.07%	372	13.23%
1916	625	19.19%	2,250	69.08%	382	11.73%
1920	1,539	35.48%	2,649	61.07%	150	3.46%
1924	1,326	31.85%	2,653	63.73%	184	4.42%
1928	3,331	60.60%	2,141	38.95%	25	0.45%
1932	523	9.54%	4,960	90.46%	0	0.00%
1936	1,126	17.57%	5,268	82.18%	16	0.25%
1940	1,564	24.03%	4,920	75.60%	24	0.37%
1944	1,496	27.65%	3,902	72.13%	12	0.22%
1948	1,058	20.63%	4,071	79.37%	0	0.00%
1952	2,657	42.20%	3,639	57.80%	0	0.00%
1956	1,810	34.97%	3,366	65.03%	0	0.00%
1960	2,678	49.46%	2,736	50.54%	0	0.00%
1964	2,001	37.37%	3,354	62.63%	0	0.00%
1968	1,748	35.71%	1,771	36.18%	1,376	28.11%
1972	3,331	70.92%	1,256	26.74%	110	2.34%
1976	1,802	38.38%	2,852	60.75%	41	0.87%
1980	2,450	52.27%	2,144	45.74%	93	1.98%
1984	2,637	60.96%	1,674	38.70%	15	0.35%
1988	1,754	44.65%	2,148	54.68%	26	0.66%
1992	1,377	32.96%	1,749	41.86%	1,052	25.18%
1996	1,346	36.79%	1,827	49.93%	486	13.28%
2000	1,920	57.33%	1,400	41.80%	29	0.87%
2004	2,273	65.92%	1,175	34.08%	0	0.00%
2008	2,195	67.81%	1,042	32.19%	0	0.00%
2012	1,815	66.70%	906	33.30%	0	0.00%
2016	1,944	71.84%	657	24.28%	105	3.88%
2020	2,076	76.66%	597	22.05%	35	1.29%
2024	2,006	79.19%	500	19.74%	27	1.07%

Voter Registration and Party Enrollment as of January 11, 2025
Party	Number of Voters	Percentage
Democratic	1,196	28.85%
Republican	2,278	54.94%
Others	672	16.21%
Total	4,146	100%

=== Government ===
At the federal level, Tillman County is represented in the United States Senate by James Lankford and Markwayne Mullin, both Republicans. It is represented in the United States House of Representatives as part of Oklahoma's 4th congressional district by Republican Tom Cole. At the state level, Tillman County is in the Oklahoma Senate's 38th district, represented by Republican Brent Howard. It is in the Oklahoma House of Representatives's 63rd district, represented by Republican Trey Caldwell. Judicially, Tillman County lies within the 3rd judicial district. It also has a board of commissioners and several elected county officials.

Office	Name	Party
Commissioner, District 1	Mark Huff	Republican
Commissioner, District 2	Joe Don Dickey	Republican
Commissioner, District 3	Levi Krasser	Republican

Office	Name	Party
Treasurer	Julie Garza	Republican
Court Clerk	Patricia Wynn	Republican
County Clerk	Cacy Caldwell	Republican
Sheriff	Oscar Juanes	Republican
Assessor	Matthew Smith	Republican

=== Politics ===
As a rural Southern county, Tillman County was once fiercely Democratic. Between formation and 1968, it gave massive landslides to Democrats (aside from 1928, when the Democratic nominee suffered from anti-Catholic sentiment). The county voted Republican for the first time in its history in 1972 in a national Republican landslide, although it continued to revert to the Democratic Party consistently aside from Republican landslide elections. At the turn of the 21st century, Tillman County shifted sharply to the right due to the leftward swing of the national Democratic Party, and has since steadily become more Republican, with Democrats failing to break 20% for the first time in history in 2024. While much of Southern Oklahoma was once known for ticket splitting, Tillman County's Republican trend has become so pronounced that there are no longer any Democrats at the state or local level.

== Transportation ==
=== Airports ===
The county contains one airport, Frederick Regional Airport. The airport is a civilian use airport, although the majority of its use is for military functions.

=== Highways ===
- US 183
- US 70
- US 62
- SH-5
  - SH-5C
- SH-36
- SH-54

== Education ==
The county is home to a branch of Great Plains Technology Center, based in Frederick.

The county is served by 6 school districts, as well as small portions of 2 neighboring school districts.

- Frederick Public Schools
- Snyder Public Schools
- Tipton Public Schools
- Chattanooga Public Schools
- Davidson Public Schools
- Grandfield Public Schools
- Indiahoma Public Schools (mainly in Comanche County)
- Big Pasture School District (mainly in Cotton County)

== Communities ==
=== Cities ===
- Frederick (county seat)
- Grandfield

=== Towns ===
- Chattanooga (mostly in Comanche County)
- Davidson
- Hollister
- Loveland
- Manitou
- Tipton

=== Ghost towns ===
- Eschiti

== See also ==
- National Register of Historic Places listings in Tillman County, Oklahoma
