= Frederick Regional Airport =

Airport in Tillman County, Oklahoma

Frederick Regional Airport former Frederick Army Airfield
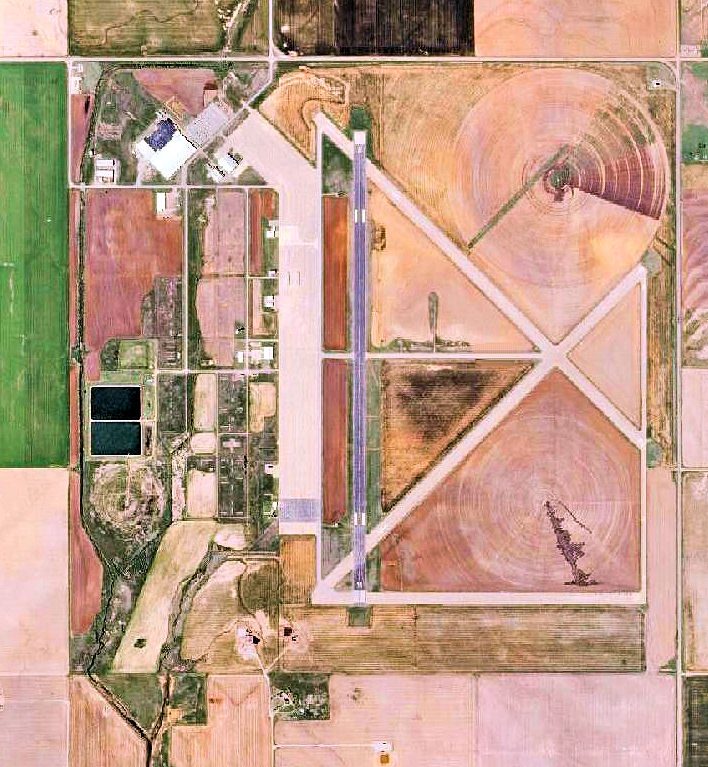
- 2008 USGS airphoto
- IATA: FDR; ICAO: KFDR; FAA LID: FDR

Summary
- Airport type: Public
- Owner: City of Frederick
- Serves: Frederick, Oklahoma
- Elevation AMSL: 1,258 ft (383 m)
- Coordinates: 34°21′08″N 98°59′02″W

Map
- Location of Frederick Regional Airport

Runways
Direction	Length		Surface
Direction	ft	m	Surface
3/21	4,812	1,467	Concrete
12/30	4,578	1,395	Concrete
17/35	6,099	1,859	Asphalt

Statistics (2008)
- Aircraft operations: 63,700
- Based aircraft: 17
- Source: Federal Aviation Administration

Frederick Regional Airport (IATA: FDR, ICAO: KFDR, FAA LID: FDR) is a city-owned, public-use airport located three nautical miles (6 km) southeast of the central business district of Frederick, a city in Tillman County, Oklahoma, United States. It was formerly known as Frederick Municipal Airport.

== History ==
Frederick Army Air Field 1944 USAAF Classbook

The airport was opened on 23 September 1942 as Frederick Army Airfield with four hard-surfaced runways, three of 6,000 foot (1,829 m) length (00/18; 04/22; 13/31) and one 4,380 feet (1,335 m) long (09/27). It was also used as a civil airport under a joint-use agreement. The airport was assigned to the United States Army Air Forces' Gulf Coast Training Center (later Central Flying Training Command) as an advanced twin-engine (level 3) pilot training airfield, with one of its instructors being comedian George Gobel. It had four local auxiliary airfields for emergency and overflow landings. The end of the AAFTC's pilot training program on October 31, 1945, marked the end of military flight operations from the airfield. On September 21, 1946, it was subsequently declared surplus and given to the Army Corps of Engineers. Eventually it was discharged to the War Assets Administration (WAA) and became a civil airport.

== Facilities and aircraft ==
Frederick Regional Airport covers an area of 1,442 acres (584 ha) at an elevation of 1,258 feet (383 m) above mean sea level. It has three runways: 17/35 is 6,099 by 150 feet (1,859 x 46 m) with an asphalt surface; 3/21 is 4,812 by 60 feet (1,467 x 18 m) with a concrete surface; 12/30 is 4,578 by 75 feet (1,395 x 23 m) with a concrete surface.

The airport is also home to the World War II Airborne Demonstration Team Foundation, a non-profit 501(c)(3) organization located in the historic former Frederick Army Airfield portion of the airport. In addition to its museum functions focused on World War II U.S. Army airborne infantry/paratrooper operations, the team also maintains two flyable C-47 Skytrain transports in one of the airport's remaining World War II military hangars. Painted in U.S. Army Air Forces markings, these aircraft are regularly flown for use in historical reenactments of paratrooper airdrop operations.

For the 12-month period ending June 9, 2008, the airport had 63,700 aircraft operations, an average of 174 per day: 94% military and 6% general aviation. At that time there were 17 aircraft based at this airport: 76% single-engine, 18% multi-engine and 6% military.

== See also ==
- Oklahoma World War II Army Airfields
- 33d Flying Training Wing (World War II)
