= Devol, Oklahoma =

Town in Oklahoma, US

- Town
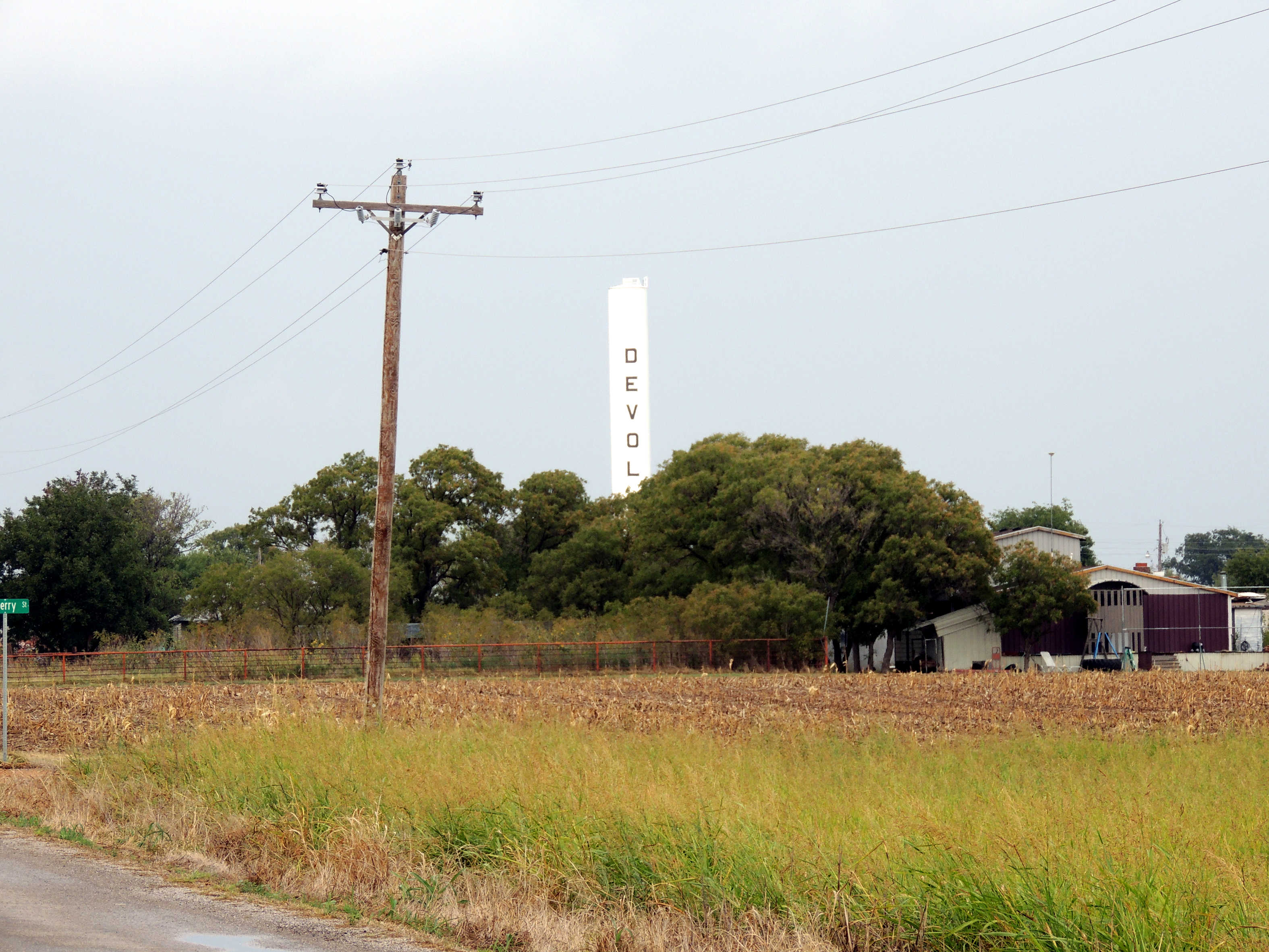
- Rural town of Devol, Oklahoma

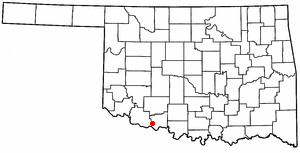
- Location of Devol, Oklahoma
- Coordinates: 34°11′43″N 98°35′18″W
- Country: United States
- State: Oklahoma
- County: Cotton

Area
  - Total: 0.50 sq mi (1.29 km^{2})
  - Land: 0.50 sq mi (1.29 km^{2})
  - Water: 0 sq mi (0.00 km^{2})
- Elevation: 1,070 ft (330 m)

Population (2020)
  - Total: 93
  - Density: 186.9/sq mi (72.18/km^{2})
- Time zone: UTC-6 (Central (CST))
  - Summer (DST): UTC-5 (CDT)
- ZIP code: 73531
- Area code: 580
- FIPS code: 40-20450
- GNIS feature ID: 2412422

Devol is a town in Cotton County, Oklahoma, United States. The population was 93 at the 2020 census, a decrease of 38 percent from 150 at the 2000 census. The town is named for J. Fiske Devol, who owned the land on which it stands.

== History ==
The community of Devol began in 1907, when the Wichita Falls and Northwestern Railway laid tracks through the area. A post office was established there on November 30, 1907. The railroad became a subsidiary of the Missouri, Kansas and Texas Railroad (MK&T or Katy) in 1911. By that year, the town had about 400 residents.

Discovery of the nearby Burkburnett Oil Field in 1918 initiated a brief boom in Devol. At least two refineries were built in the area, along with several oil pipelines. The 1920 census showed the population was 1,936. The town had the first dynamo in the area used for power in one of the two dance halls. Devol is said to have had four churches, a lumber store, feed store, a hotel, two dance halls/bars, a brothel and hundreds of small structures to rent as a home during the growing Burk boom. However, the boom ended in 1922, and most of the people related to that business moved away. The town bank failed in 1927. In 1930, the population of Devol was only 328. The 1940 census showed 208 residents.

Devol continued to shrink after World War II. Only 152 residents remained in 1950. The high school closed in 1953, and in 1957, all grades were consolidated along with those of Randlett and Union Valley to form the Big Pasture School District in Randlett. In 1959 a tornado damaged most of Devol's business district (all three on the main street) and the old high school building. The town's population reached 117, the lowest recorded in its history until the 2020 census. The MK&T abandoned its tracks in 1972, and in the 1980s the only remaining business was a tack shop that specialized in making race horse saddles. It closed in the 1990s.

The only business in Devol proper is the Helena Chemical Company, formerly M&E Soil Service, who employs two people. The post office had been threatened with closure in 1997 and 2002, and now operates limited weekly hours. However, a handful of casinos employ hundreds of employees southwest of the town near the Texas border

== Geography ==
According to the United States Census Bureau, the town has a total area of 0.5 square miles (1.3 km^{2}), all land.

== Demographics ==
Historical population
Census	Pop.	Note	%±
1920	1,936		—
1930	328		−83.1%
1940	208		−36.6%
1950	152		−26.9%
1960	117		−23.0%
1970	129		10.3%
1980	186		44.2%
1990	165		−11.3%
2000	150		−9.1%
2010	151		0.7%
2020	93		−38.4%
U.S. Decennial Census

=== 2020 census ===
As of the 2020 census, Devol had a population of 93. The median age was 40.9 years. 25.8% of residents were under the age of 18 and 25.8% of residents were 65 years of age or older. For every 100 females there were 111.4 males, and for every 100 females age 18 and over there were 130.0 males age 18 and over.

0.0% of residents lived in urban areas, while 100.0% lived in rural areas.

There were 39 households in Devol, of which 38.5% had children under the age of 18 living in them. Of all households, 43.6% were married-couple households, 25.6% were households with a male householder and no spouse or partner present, and 15.4% were households with a female householder and no spouse or partner present. About 15.4% of all households were made up of individuals and 10.3% had someone living alone who was 65 years of age or older.

There were 45 housing units, of which 13.3% were vacant. The homeowner vacancy rate was 0.0% and the rental vacancy rate was 16.7%.

Racial composition as of the 2020 census
Race	Number	Percent
White	77	82.8%
Black or African American	1	1.1%
American Indian and Alaska Native	2	2.2%
Asian	1	1.1%
Native Hawaiian and Other Pacific Islander	0	0.0%
Some other race	3	3.2%
Two or more races	9	9.7%
Hispanic or Latino (of any race)	14	15.1%

=== 2000 census ===
As of the census of 2000, there were 150 people, 62 households, and 40 families residing in the town. The population density was 302.0 inhabitants per square mile (116.6/km^{2}). There were 68 housing units at an average density of 136.9 per square mile (52.9/km^{2}). The racial makeup of the town was 90.67% White, 4.67% Native American, and 4.67% from two or more races. Hispanic or Latino of any race were 8.67% of the population.

There were 62 households, out of which 30.6% had children under the age of 18 living with them, 56.5% were married couples living together, 8.1% had a female householder with no husband present, and 33.9% were non-families. 33.9% of all households were made up of individuals, and 16.1% had someone living alone who was 65 years of age or older. The average household size was 2.42 and the average family size was 3.12.

In the town, the population was spread out, with 22.7% under the age of 18, 10.7% from 18 to 24, 29.3% from 25 to 44, 21.3% from 45 to 64, and 16.0% who were 65 years of age or older. The median age was 36 years. For every 100 females, there were 114.3 males. For every 100 females age 18 and over, there were 107.1 males.

The median income for a household in the town was $35,313, and the median income for a family was $46,563. Males had a median income of $23,750 versus $28,333 for females. The per capita income for the town was $14,792. There were 2.1% of families and 9.4% of the population living below the poverty line, including 2.0% of under eighteens and 36.0% of those over 64.
