= Temple, Oklahoma =

Town in Oklahoma, US

- Town
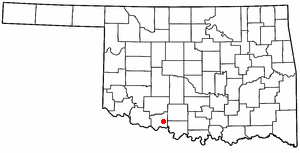
- Location of Temple, Oklahoma
- Coordinates: 34°16′23″N 98°14′06″W
- Country: United States
- State: Oklahoma
- County: Cotton

Area
  - Total: 1.29 sq mi (3.33 km^{2})
  - Land: 1.29 sq mi (3.33 km^{2})
  - Water: 0 sq mi (0.00 km^{2})
- Elevation: 1,007 ft (307 m)

Population (2020)
  - Total: 862
  - Density: 670.1/sq mi (258.71/km^{2})
- Time zone: UTC-6 (Central (CST))
  - Summer (DST): UTC-5 (CDT)
- ZIP code: 73568
- Area code: 580
- FIPS code: 40-72750
- GNIS feature ID: 2413372

Temple is a town in Cotton County, Oklahoma, United States. It is 5 miles (8.0 km) south and 5 miles (8.0 km) east of Walters, the county seat. The population was 862 at the 2020 census, a decline of 14.0 percent from 1,002 at the 2010 census. The town is named for the celebrated trial lawyer of Texas and Oklahoma Territory, Temple Lea Houston (1860–1905), the youngest son of General Sam Houston.

== Geography ==
Temple is located at the intersection of Oklahoma State highways 5 and 65. Walters is approximately seven miles to the northwest.

According to the United States Census Bureau, the town has a total area of 1.3 square miles (3.4 km^{2}), all land.

== Demographics ==
Historical population
| Census | Pop. | Note | %± |
|---|---|---|---|
| 1910 | 852 | | — |
| 1920 | 906 | | 6.3% |
| 1930 | 1,182 | | 30.5% |
| 1940 | 1,313 | | 11.1% |
| 1950 | 1,442 | | 9.8% |
| 1960 | 1,282 | | −11.1% |
| 1970 | 1,354 | | 5.6% |
| 1980 | 1,339 | | −1.1% |
| 1990 | 1,223 | | −8.7% |
| 2000 | 1,146 | | −6.3% |
| 2010 | 1,002 | | −12.6% |
| 2020 | 862 | | −14.0% |
U.S. Decennial Census

=== 2020 census ===
As of the 2020 census, Temple had a population of 862. The median age was 45.2 years. 22.2% of residents were under the age of 18 and 24.9% of residents were 65 years of age or older. For every 100 females there were 96.8 males, and for every 100 females age 18 and over there were 94.5 males age 18 and over.

0.0% of residents lived in urban areas, while 100.0% lived in rural areas.

There were 349 households in Temple, of which 30.7% had children under the age of 18 living in them. Of all households, 44.7% were married-couple households, 19.8% were households with a male householder and no spouse or partner present, and 28.7% were households with a female householder and no spouse or partner present. About 28.1% of all households were made up of individuals and 12.3% had someone living alone who was 65 years of age or older.

There were 456 housing units, of which 23.5% were vacant. The homeowner vacancy rate was 4.3% and the rental vacancy rate was 16.4%.

Racial composition as of the 2020 census
| Race | Number | Percent |
|---|---|---|
| White | 615 | 71.3% |
| Black or African American | 49 | 5.7% |
| American Indian and Alaska Native | 63 | 7.3% |
| Asian | 0 | 0.0% |
| Native Hawaiian and Other Pacific Islander | 1 | 0.1% |
| Some other race | 38 | 4.4% |
| Two or more races | 96 | 11.1% |
| Hispanic or Latino (of any race) | 81 | 9.4% |

=== 2000 census ===
As of the census of 2000, there were 1,146 people, 488 households, and 301 families residing in the town. The population density was 876.8 inhabitants per square mile (338.5/km^{2}). There were 604 housing units at an average density of 462.1 per square mile (178.4/km^{2}). The racial makeup of the town was 75.65% White, 11.34% African American, 4.89% Native American, 0.17% Asian, 4.71% from other races, and 3.23% from two or more races. Hispanic or Latino of any race were 7.24% of the population.

There were 488 households, out of which 27.3% had children under the age of 18 living with them, 46.1% were married couples living together, 12.9% had a female householder with no husband present, and 38.3% were non-families. 34.4% of all households were made up of individuals, and 18.2% had someone living alone who was 65 years of age or older. The average household size was 2.27 and the average family size was 2.93.

In the town, the population was spread out, with 24.3% under the age of 18, 7.9% from 18 to 24, 24.2% from 25 to 44, 21.2% from 45 to 64, and 22.5% who were 65 years of age or older. The median age was 40 years. For every 100 females, there were 91.0 males. For every 100 females age 18 and over, there were 84.7 males.

The median income for a household in the town was $18,864, and the median income for a family was $24,688. Males had a median income of $26,806 versus $17,708 for females. The per capita income for the town was $12,448. About 22.8% of families and 29.5% of the population were below the poverty line, including 43.3% of those under age 18 and 20.0% of those age 65 or over.

== Notable people ==
- LaDonna Harris (born 1931), Comanche political activist, birthplace
- Pepper Martin (1904—1965), Major League baseball player, birthplace
- Spec Sanders (January 26, 1919 – July 6, 2003), professional football player, birthplace
