= Taylor, Cotton County, Oklahoma =

Unincorporated community in Oklahoma, US

Taylor
- Unincorporated community
- Location within the state of Oklahoma Taylor (the United States)
- Coordinates: 34°10′25″N 98°19′52″W
- Country: United States
- State: Oklahoma
- County: Cotton
- Elevation: 997 ft (304 m)
- Time zone: UTC-6 (Central (CST))
  - Summer (DST): UTC-5 (CDT)
- GNIS feature ID: 1100877

Taylor is an unincorporated community in Cotton County, Oklahoma, United States. The elevation is 994 feet. It was named after a local merchant, John Taylor. The community had a post office from November 30, 1907 to May 31, 1911.
