= Randlett, Oklahoma =

Town in Cotton County, Oklahoma, United States

- Town
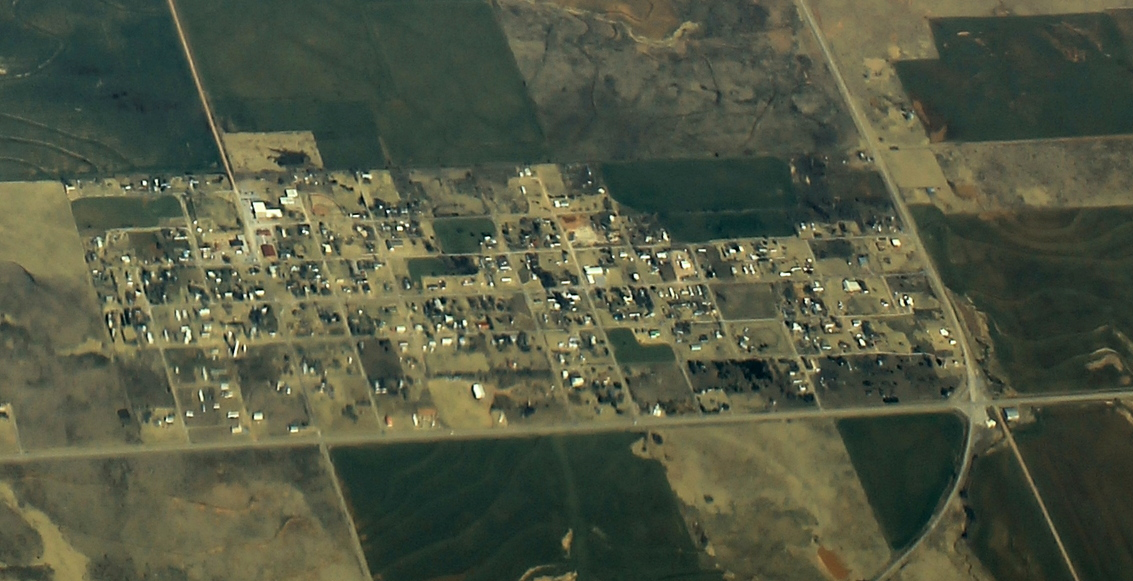
- Aerial view of Randlett

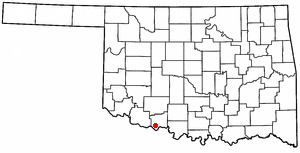
- Location of Randlett, Oklahoma
- Coordinates: 34°10′38″N 98°27′50″W
- Country: United States
- State: Oklahoma
- County: Cotton

Area
  - Total: 0.63 sq mi (1.63 km^{2})
  - Land: 0.63 sq mi (1.63 km^{2})
  - Water: 0 sq mi (0.00 km^{2})
- Elevation: 1,040 ft (320 m)

Population (2020)
  - Total: 289
  - Density: 460.6/sq mi (177.84/km^{2})
- Time zone: UTC-6 (Central (CST))
  - Summer (DST): UTC-5 (CDT)
- ZIP code: 73562
- Area code: 580
- FIPS code: 40-61850
- GNIS feature ID: 2412527

Randlett is a town in Cotton County, Oklahoma, United States. The population was 289 as of the 2020 United States census. Randlett is located about 22 driving miles south-southwest of the county seat of Walters, and is at the corner where US Route 277 and US Route 281 join US Route 70 (going south).

== History ==
The town of Randlett was named for James F. Randlett, an agent for the Comanche and Kiowa. It was platted in 1906, and the lots were sold at a public auction on May 13, 1907. By 1910, it had a population of 574. An attempt to attract a railroad failed, but Randlett still prospered as an agricultural center. A brief oil and gas drilling boom occurred in the 1910s and 20s.

== Geography ==
According to the United States Census Bureau, the town has a total area of 0.6 square miles (1.6 km^{2}), all land.

== Demographics ==
Historical population
Census	Pop.	Note	%±
1910	574		—
1920	323		−43.7%
1930	257		−20.4%
1940	327		27.2%
1950	396		21.1%
1960	356		−10.1%
1970	384		7.9%
1980	461		20.1%
1990	458		−0.7%
2000	511		11.6%
2010	438		−14.3%
2020	289		−34.0%
U.S. Decennial Census

=== 2020 census ===
As of the 2020 census, Randlett had a population of 289. The median age was 42.8 years. 21.5% of residents were under the age of 18 and 20.1% of residents were 65 years of age or older. For every 100 females there were 100.7 males, and for every 100 females age 18 and over there were 99.1 males age 18 and over.

0.0% of residents lived in urban areas, while 100.0% lived in rural areas.

There were 122 households in Randlett, of which 32.0% had children under the age of 18 living in them. Of all households, 50.8% were married-couple households, 18.0% were households with a male householder and no spouse or partner present, and 22.1% were households with a female householder and no spouse or partner present. About 19.7% of all households were made up of individuals and 9.0% had someone living alone who was 65 years of age or older.

There were 144 housing units, of which 15.3% were vacant. The homeowner vacancy rate was 0.0% and the rental vacancy rate was 4.3%.

Racial composition as of the 2020 census
Race	Number	Percent
White	256	88.6%
Black or African American	2	0.7%
American Indian and Alaska Native	2	0.7%
Asian	0	0.0%
Native Hawaiian and Other Pacific Islander	0	0.0%
Some other race	7	2.4%
Two or more races	22	7.6%
Hispanic or Latino (of any race)	21	7.3%

Randlett is served by Big Pasture Public Schools, a rural consolidated school system.

== See also ==
- List of municipalities in Oklahoma
