= Walters, Oklahoma =

City in Oklahoma, US

- City
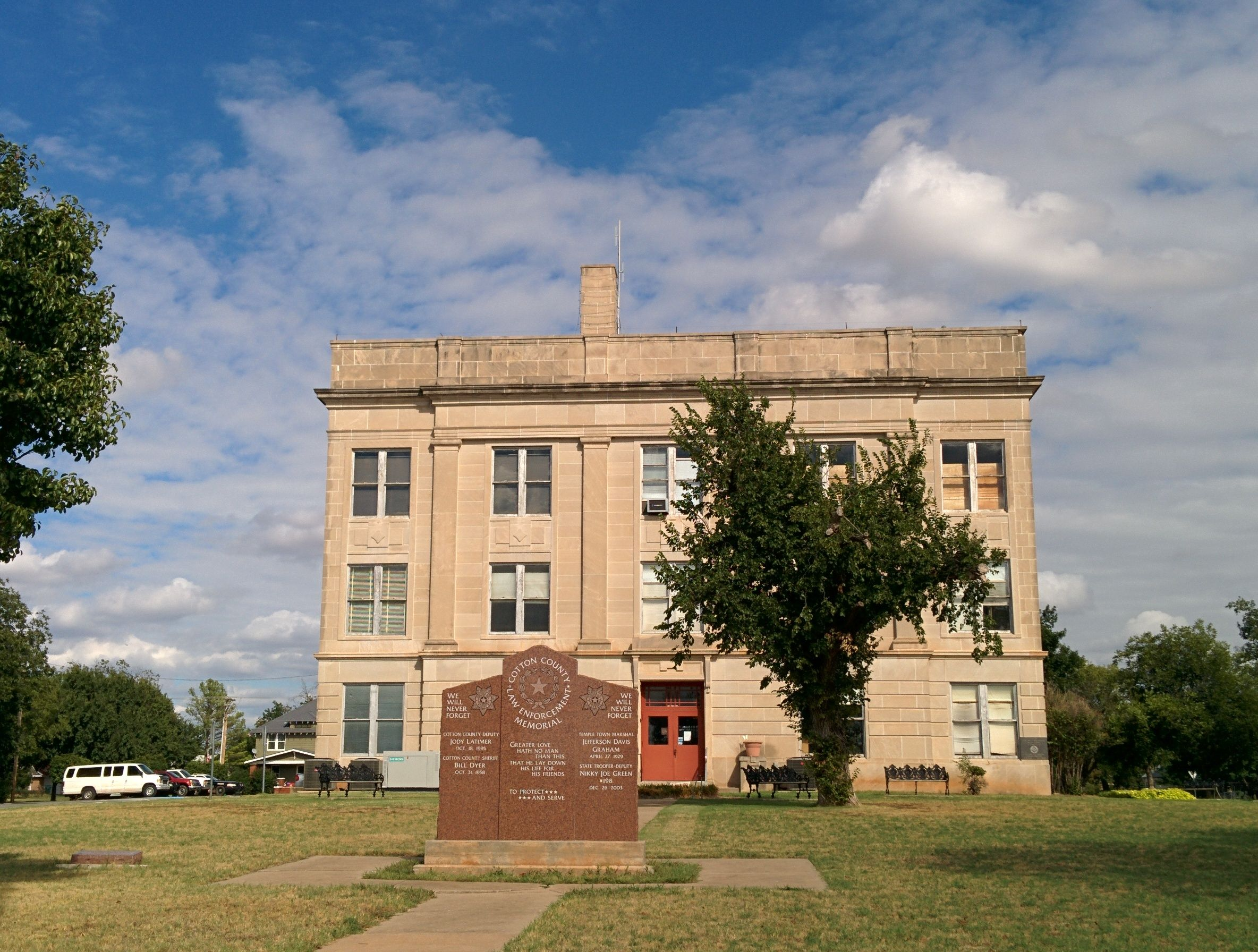
- Cotton County Courthouse in 2014
- Motto: "Small town; Big heart"
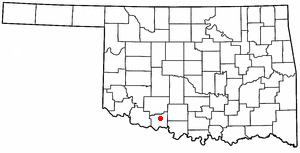
- Location of Walters, Oklahoma
- Coordinates: 34°21′40″N 98°21′24″W
- Country: United States
- State: Oklahoma
- County: Cotton
- Established: October 21, 1902

Area
  - Total: 8.33 sq mi (21.57 km^{2})
  - Land: 8.07 sq mi (20.89 km^{2})
  - Water: 0.26 sq mi (0.68 km^{2})
- Elevation: 1,066 ft (325 m)

Population (2020)
  - Total: 2,412
  - Density: 299.0/sq mi (115.44/km^{2})
- Time zone: UTC-6 (Central (CST))
  - Summer (DST): UTC-5 (CDT)
- ZIP code: 73572
- Area code: 580
- FIPS code: 40-78150
- GNIS feature ID: 2412177
- Website: www.waltersok.org

Walters is a city and the county seat, nestled between twin creeks, of Cotton County, Oklahoma, United States. Its population was 2,412 as of the 2020 United States census. The city's motto is "Small Town; Big Heart".

== History ==
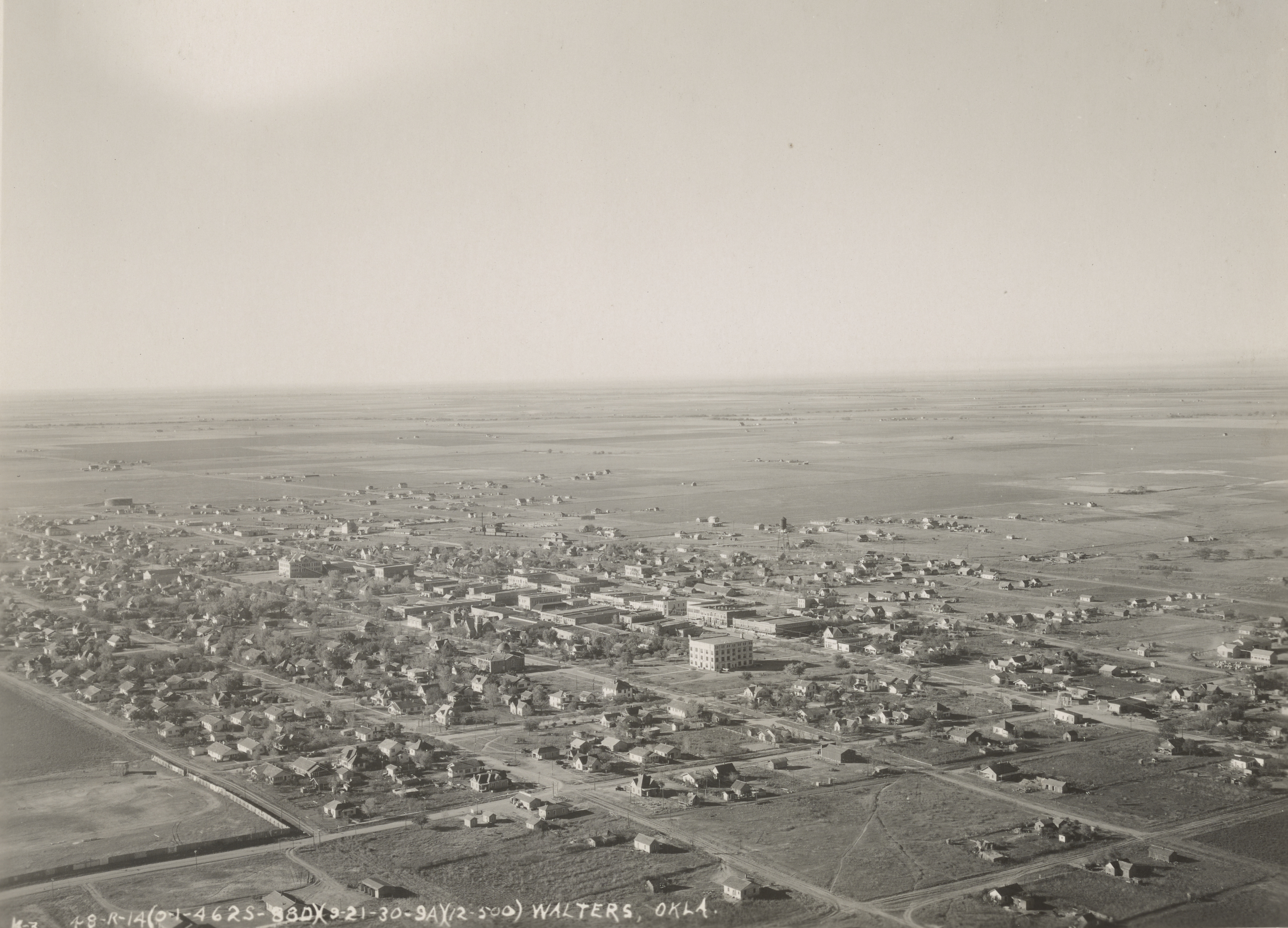
Walters in 1930

The land that is present-day Oklahoma was first settled by prehistoric American Indians including the Clovis 11500 BCE, Folsom 10600 BCE, and Plainview 10000 BCE cultures. Western explorers came to the region in the 16th century, with Spanish explorer Francisco Vásquez de Coronado visiting in 1541. Most of the region during this time was settled by the Wichita and Caddo peoples. Around the 1700s, two tribes from the north, the Comanche and Kiowa, migrated to the Oklahoma and Texas region.

For most of the 18th century, the Oklahoma region was under French control as part of Louisiana. In 1803, the Louisiana Purchase by Thomas Jefferson brought the area under United States control. In 1830, Congress passed the Indian Removal Act, which removed American Indian tribes and relocated them to Indian Territory. The southern part of the territory was originally assigned to the Choctaw and Chickasaw, until the 1867 Medicine Lodge Treaty allotted the southwest portion of the Choctaw and Chickasaw's lands to the Comanche, Kiowa, and Apache.

The City of Walters was organized on August 6, 1901, under the original name of McKnight (named after the registrar at the Lawton land office), Indian Territory. Application for a post office was made, but a town in Harmon County was found to have already taken the name of McKnight. This required that the name be changed. Walter was chosen, in honor of either McKnight's son or for a prominent resident, William Walter(s). The post office was named Walter but Congress allowed it to be changed to Walters in 1917 .

The city finally grew large enough to meet the requirements for a government patent, and one was granted in June 1904. On August 12, 1912, an election was held to form a new county (Cotton) from a portion of Comanche County. The election was successful, and Cotton County became the last county formed in Oklahoma, on August 28, 1912. Shortly thereafter, another election was held to determine whether Walters or Temple would become the county seat; on December 2, 1912, Walters won by 282 votes, officially becoming the seat of Cotton County. The names of Walter and Walters were used interchangeably and confusingly until June 1917, when an application was made to Congress to officially change the post office name to Walters.

== Geography ==
The city is lies in the Taovayan Valley, the area between the Wichita Mountains and the Red River. Consisting of grassland, oak savannahs, and rolling hills, the city lies within an ecotone on the western edge of the Cross Timbers, which are located to the east. Monsoon-like rains are common in the spring, while periods of drought can occur throughout other parts of the year. The city is about 19 miles (31 km) south of Lawton, situated between two tributaries of the Red River, the East and West Cache Creeks. The bottom lands around the creeks are thickly surrounded by burr oak, escarpment live oak, Shumard oak, pecan, eastern redbud, American persimmon, and American elm.

According to the United States Census Bureau, the city has a total area of 8.4 square miles (22 km^{2}), of which 0.2 sq mi (0.52 km^{2}) (2.75%) is covered by water.

For tourism purposes, the Oklahoma Tourism and Recreation Department has designated Southwestern Oklahoma, including Cotton County, as Great Plains Country.

Climate data for Walters, Oklahoma
Month	Jan	Feb	Mar	Apr	May	Jun	Jul	Aug	Sep	Oct	Nov	Dec	Year
Mean daily maximum °F (°C)	52.5 (11.4)	58.4 (14.7)	66.7 (19.3)	76.2 (24.6)	83.2 (28.4)	91.5 (33.1)	96.7 (35.9)	96.7 (35.9)	88.5 (31.4)	77.6 (25.3)	64.7 (18.2)	54.8 (12.7)	75.6 (24.2)
Mean daily minimum °F (°C)	28.0 (−2.2)	32.4 (0.2)	39.4 (4.1)	49.4 (9.7)	58.7 (14.8)	67.5 (19.7)	71.1 (21.7)	70.4 (21.3)	62.9 (17.2)	51.5 (10.8)	39.2 (4.0)	30.6 (−0.8)	50.1 (10.0)
Average precipitation inches (mm)	1.4 (36)	1.6 (41)	3.2 (81)	3.8 (97)	4.7 (120)	4.8 (120)	2.4 (61)	2.6 (66)	3.4 (86)	3.3 (84)	1.7 (43)	1.5 (38)	34.4 (870)
Source 1: weather.com
Source 2: Weatherbase

== Demographics ==
Historical population
Census	Pop.	Note	%±
1910	1,377		—
1920	3,032		120.2%
1930	2,262		−25.4%
1940	2,238		−1.1%
1950	2,743		22.6%
1960	2,825		3.0%
1970	2,611		−7.6%
1980	2,778		6.4%
1990	2,519		−9.3%
2000	2,657		5.5%
2010	2,551		−4.0%
2020	2,412		−5.4%
U.S. Decennial Census

=== 2020 census ===
As of the 2020 census, Walters had a population of 2,412. The median age was 37.4 years. 27.8% of residents were under the age of 18 and 16.4% of residents were 65 years of age or older. For every 100 females there were 90.2 males, and for every 100 females age 18 and over there were 86.6 males age 18 and over.

As of the 2020 census, 0% of residents lived in urban areas, while 100.0% lived in rural areas.

As of the 2020 census, there were 957 households in Walters, of which 34.8% had children under the age of 18 living in them. Of all households, 41.9% were married-couple households, 19.7% were households with a male householder and no spouse or partner present, and 30.7% were households with a female householder and no spouse or partner present. About 28.8% of all households were made up of individuals and 14.4% had someone living alone who was 65 years of age or older.

As of the 2020 census, there were 1,165 housing units, of which 17.9% were vacant. Among occupied housing units, 66.9% were owner-occupied and 33.1% were renter-occupied. The homeowner vacancy rate was 3.1% and the rental vacancy rate was 8.6%.

Racial composition as of the 2020 census
Race	Percent
White	69.2%
Black or African American	0.5%
American Indian and Alaska Native	15.1%
Asian	0.8%
Native Hawaiian and Other Pacific Islander	0.2%
Some other race	1.2%
Two or more races	13.0%
Hispanic or Latino (of any race)	6.7%

=== 2000 census ===
As of the 2000 census, 2,657 people, 1,063 households, and 721 families resided in the city. The population density was 326.6 inhabitants per square mile (126.1/km^{2}). The 1,256 housing units had an average density of 154.4 per square mile (59.6/km^{2}). The racial makeup of the city was 84.38% White, 0.38% African American, 10.24% Native American, 0.08% Asian, 1.02% from other races, and 3.91% from two or more races. Hispanics or Latinos of any race were 3.42% of the population.

Of the 1,063 households, 33.6% had children under 18 living with them, 54.1% were married couples living together, 10.4% had a female householder with no husband present, and 32.1% were not families. About 30.1% of all households were made up of individuals, and 18.3% had someone living alone who was 65 or older. The average household size was 2.45 and the average family size was 3.05.

The city's age distribution was 27.8% under 18, 7.4% from 18 to 24, 26.7% from 25 to 44, 19.9% from 45 to 64, and 18.3% who were 65 or older. The median age was 37 years. For every 100 females, there were 87.0 males. For every 100 females 18 and over, there were 84.5 males.

The median income for a household in the city was $25,771, and for a family was $31,532. Males had a median income of $27,578 versus $18,669 for females. The per capita income for the city was $14,398. About 15.9% of families and 19.6% of the population were below the poverty line, including 25.4% of those under 18 and 17.9% of those 65 or over.

== Historic buildings ==
All NRHP-listed buildings in Cotton County are located in Walters:

- The First United Methodist Church was built in 1917.
- The Cotton County Courthouse, a Classical Revival structure, is from 1925.
- The Walters Rock Island Depot: In 1984, the city bought the Rock Island Depot, and the Cotton County Art Council rehabilitated the building, turning it into a museum.

== Culture ==
The Walters Herald, the local newspaper published since 1925, promotes itself as the "Voice of Cotton County".

Walters has many annual festivals that take place throughout the year, centered around the arts, agriculture, Western cowboy culture, and Native American culture.

=== Spring ===
The CCAC Arts and Crafts Festival is a judged arts-and-crafts festival sponsored by the Cotton County Art Council and the Oklahoma Arts Council.

=== Summer ===
Comanche Nation Homecoming Powwow features multiple categories of traditional American Indian dancing, including gourd, cloth, buckskin, straight, fancy and more. Food and merchandise vendors are also on hand.

Round Up Club Rodeo, which besides the actual multiday rodeo, features a parade with decorated cars, trucks, tractors, and floats.

== Notable people ==
- Terry Brown (American football) is the only Oklahoman to score a touchdown in a Super Bowl.
- Fred R. Harris (b. 1930), former U.S Senator from Oklahoma and U.S presidential candidate
- LaDonna Harris (b. 1931), Comanche Native American social activist and politician
- Van Heflin (1908-1971), Hollywood movie actor
- Jed Johnson, Sr. (1888-1963), a politician and editor, practiced law in Walters.
- Abe Lemons (1922-2002), a college basketball coach, was a graduate of Walters High School.
- James C. Nance, Oklahoma community newspaper chain publisher and former Speaker of the Oklahoma House of Representatives, President pro tempore of the Oklahoma Senate and member Uniform Law Commission

== Utilities ==
Telephone, Internet, and digital TV are provided by Hilliary Communications.
