= Texoma =

- Region
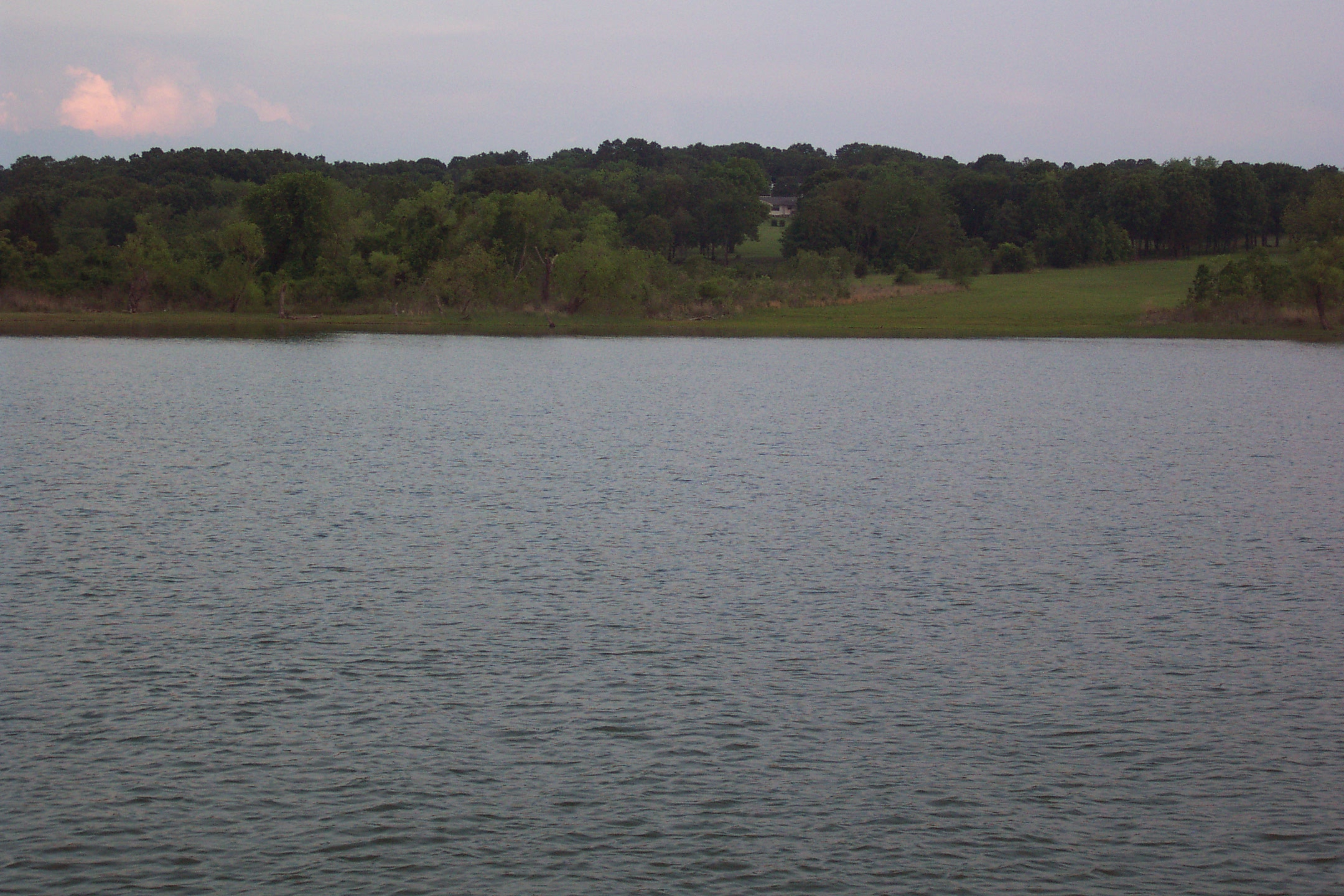
- Lake Texoma

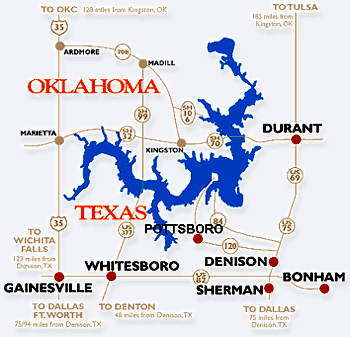
- Map of Texoma Region
- Country: United States
- State: Oklahoma; Texas
- Largest city: Sherman

Area
  - Total: 14,961 km^{2} (5,776 sq mi)
  - Land: 14,396 km^{2} (5,558 sq mi)
  - Water: 565 km^{2} (218 sq mi) 3.8%

Population (2010)
  - Total: 319,455
  - Density: 22.191/km^{2} (57.473/sq mi)

Texoma is an interstate region in the United States, split between Oklahoma and Texas. The name is a portmanteau of Texas and Oklahoma. Businesses use the term in their names to describe their intended service area. This includes 8 counties with a population estimate of 342,673 as of 2020.

== Definition ==
Texoma is usually defined as the area on either side of the state border along the Red River valley, in particular the area around Lake Texoma. The surrounding area is alternatively referred to as Texomaland. The Wichita Falls–Lawton and Paris–Hugo areas are often included in Texoma or Texomaland due to their proximity to the Red River and the Texas/Oklahoma border.

Texoma mainly comprises the area and cities surrounding Lake Texoma, which includes eight counties. Much of the population is concentrated in the Sherman–Denison Metropolitan Statistical Area and three Micropolitan Statistical Areas. The area around Bonham is also populous.

Most of the region is also part of the Dallas–Fort Worth Combined Statistical Area.

A portion of Texoma south of Lake Texoma has been designated an American Viticultural Area, the Texoma AVA. The Texas part of Texoma is served by the Texoma Council of Governments.

== Notable cities ==
City	2020 Census	County
Sherman, Texas	43,565	Grayson County, Texas
Denison, Texas	26,446	Grayson County, Texas
Ardmore, Oklahoma	24,730	Carter County, Oklahoma
Gainesville, Texas	16,002	Cooke County, Texas
Durant, Oklahoma	17,394	Bryan County, Oklahoma
Bonham, Texas	10,408	Fannin County, Texas

=== Other cities and towns ===
in Oklahoma

- Achille, Oklahoma
- Altus, Oklahoma
- Ardmore, Oklahoma
- Armstrong, Oklahoma
- Bennington, Oklahoma
- Bromide, Oklahoma
- Bokchito, Oklahoma
- Caddo, Oklahoma
- Calera, Oklahoma
- Colbert, Oklahoma
- Dickson, Oklahoma
- Duncan, Oklahoma
- Gene Autry, Oklahoma
- Healdton, Oklahoma
- Hugo, Oklahoma
- Hendrix, Oklahoma
- Kemp, Oklahoma
- Kenefic, Oklahoma
- Kingston, Oklahoma
- Lawton, Oklahoma
- Leon, Oklahoma
- Lone Grove, Oklahoma
- Marietta, Oklahoma
- Madill, Oklahoma
- Mannsville, Oklahoma
- Mead, Oklahoma
- Milburn, Oklahoma
- Mill Creek, Oklahoma
- New Woodville, Oklahoma
- Oakland, Oklahoma
- Ratliff City, Oklahoma
- Ravia, Oklahoma
- Silo, Oklahoma
- Soper, Oklahoma
- Springer, Oklahoma
- Tatums, Oklahoma
- Thackerville, Oklahoma
- Tishomingo, Oklahoma
- Wapanucka, Oklahoma
- Wilson, Oklahoma

in Texas

- Archer City, Texas
- Bailey, Texas
- Bells, Texas
- Bowie, Texas
- Burkburnett, Texas
- Callisburg, Texas
- Childress, Texas
- Collinsville, Texas
- Crowell, Texas
- Decatur, Texas
- Dodd City, Texas
- Dorchester, Texas
- Ector, Texas
- Electra, Texas
- Forestburg, Texas
- Gunter, Texas
- Gainesville, Texas
- Honey Grove, Texas
- Howe, Texas
- Henrietta, Texas
- Jacksboro, Texas
- Ladonia, Texas
- Leonard, Texas
- Lindsay, Texas
- Montague, Texas
- Muenster, Texas
- Nocona, Texas
- Oak Ridge, Texas
- Paris, Texas
- Pecan Gap, Texas
- Pottsboro, Texas
- Quanah, Texas
- Ravenna, Texas
- Sadler, Texas
- Savoy, Texas
- Scotland, Texas
- Seymour, Texas
- Sherman, Texas
- Southmayd, Texas
- Sunset, Texas
- Tioga, Texas
- Tom Bean, Texas
- Trenton, Texas
- Valley View, Texas
- Van Alstyne, Texas
- Vernon, Texas
- Windom, Texas
- Windthorst, Texas
- Whitesboro, Texas
- Whitewright, Texas
- Wichita Falls, Texas

== Counties and statistical areas ==
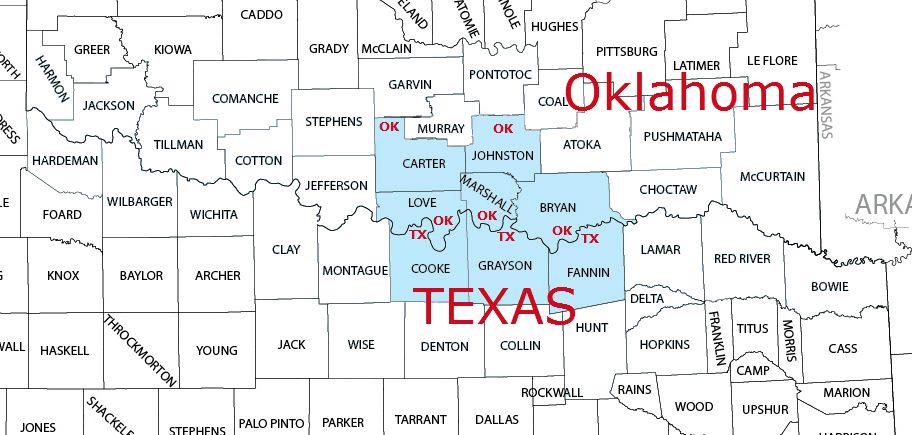
County map of North Texas and Southern Oklahoma, with the Texoma region marked in light blue.

The Texoma region consists of eight counties, five of which are in Oklahoma and three of which are in Texas.

in Oklahoma

- Bryan County, Oklahoma
- Carter County, Oklahoma
- Johnston County, Oklahoma
- Love County, Oklahoma
- Marshall County, Oklahoma

in Texas

- Cooke County, Texas
- Fannin County, Texas
- Grayson County, Texas

Some of the counties are included in Texoma's one metropolitan area and three micropolitan areas. In each case, the metro- or micropolitan area corresponds to a single county.

- Ardmore μSA, covering Carter County.
- Durant μSA, covering Bryan County.
- Gainesville μSA, covering Cooke County.
- Sherman–Denison MSA, covering Grayson County.

== See also ==
- Big Pasture
- Choctaw Nation of Oklahoma, which has its headquarters in Durant, Oklahoma
- East Texas
- Eisenhower State Park
- Greer County, Texas, now defunct county and site of a 19th-century state boundary dispute
- Choctaw (Kiamichi) Country and Little Dixie, often considered interchangeable
- North Texas
- Northeast Texas
- Piney Woods
- South Central Oklahoma
- Southwestern Oklahoma
- Texoma Council of Governments
- Tishomingo National Wildlife Refuge
- Washita River
