= Oklahoma State Highway 99 =

Highway in Oklahoma

State Highway 99

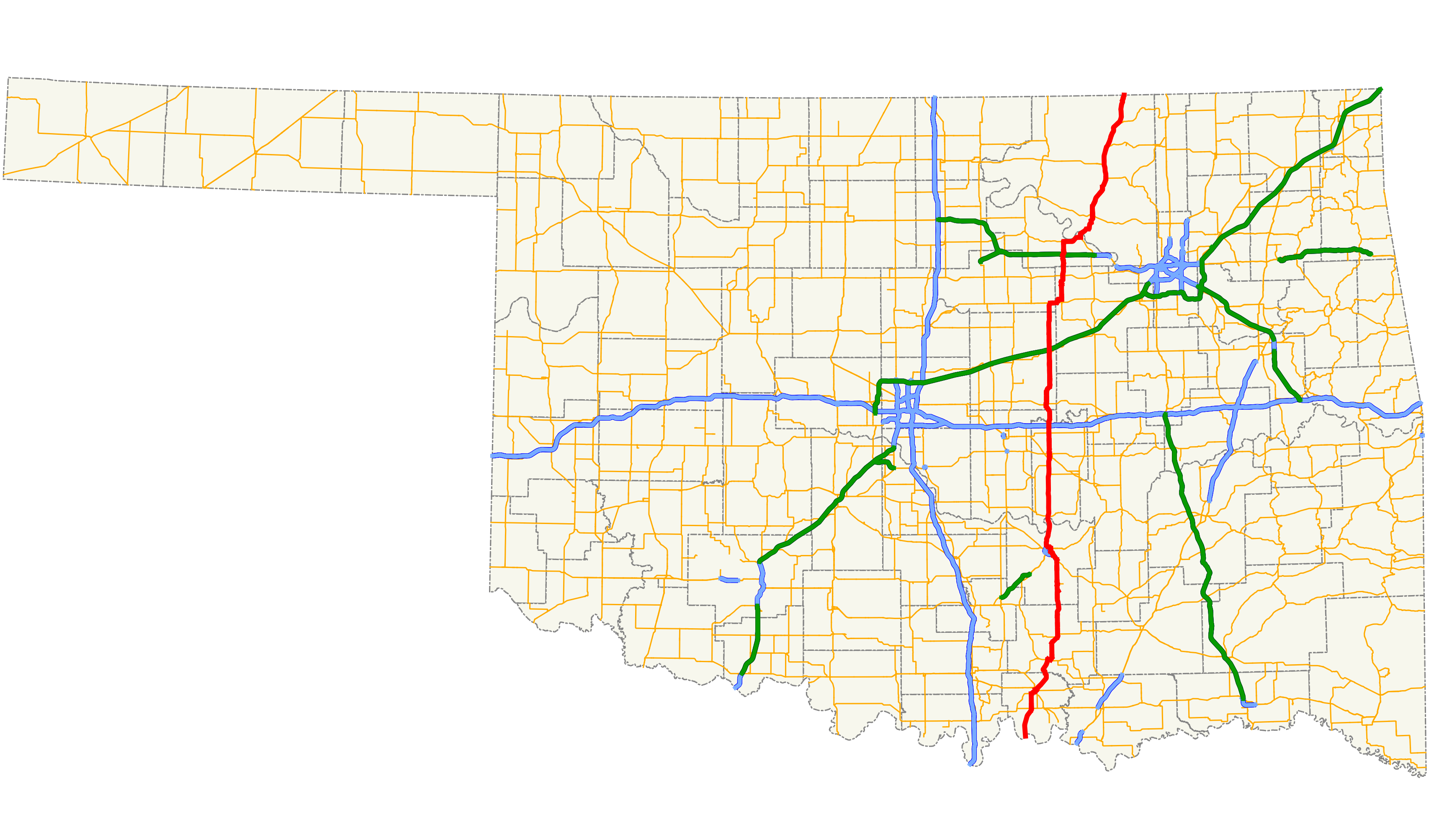

Route information
- Maintained by ODOT
- Length: 241.5 mi (388.7 km)
- Existed: May 17, 1938–present
- History: Previously SH-48 January 19, 1927 – May 16, 1938

Major junctions
- South end: US 377 at the Texas state line in Sherwood Shores, TX
- US 70 / SH-199 in Madill; I-40 near Seminole; US 62 in Prague; I-44 / Turner Turnpike in Stroud; Future I-42 / US 412 / Cimarron Turnpike in Hallett; US 64 / SH-48 in Cleveland; US 60 / SH-11 in Pawhuska
- North end: K-99 at the Kansas state line in Chautauqua, KS

Location
- Country: United States
- State: Oklahoma
- Counties: Marshall, Johnston, Pontotoc, Seminole, Pottawatomie, Lincoln, Payne, Creek, Pawnee, Osage

Highway system
- Oklahoma State Highway System; Interstate; US; State; Turnpikes
← SH-98	→ SH-100
← SH-325	US-377	→ US 385

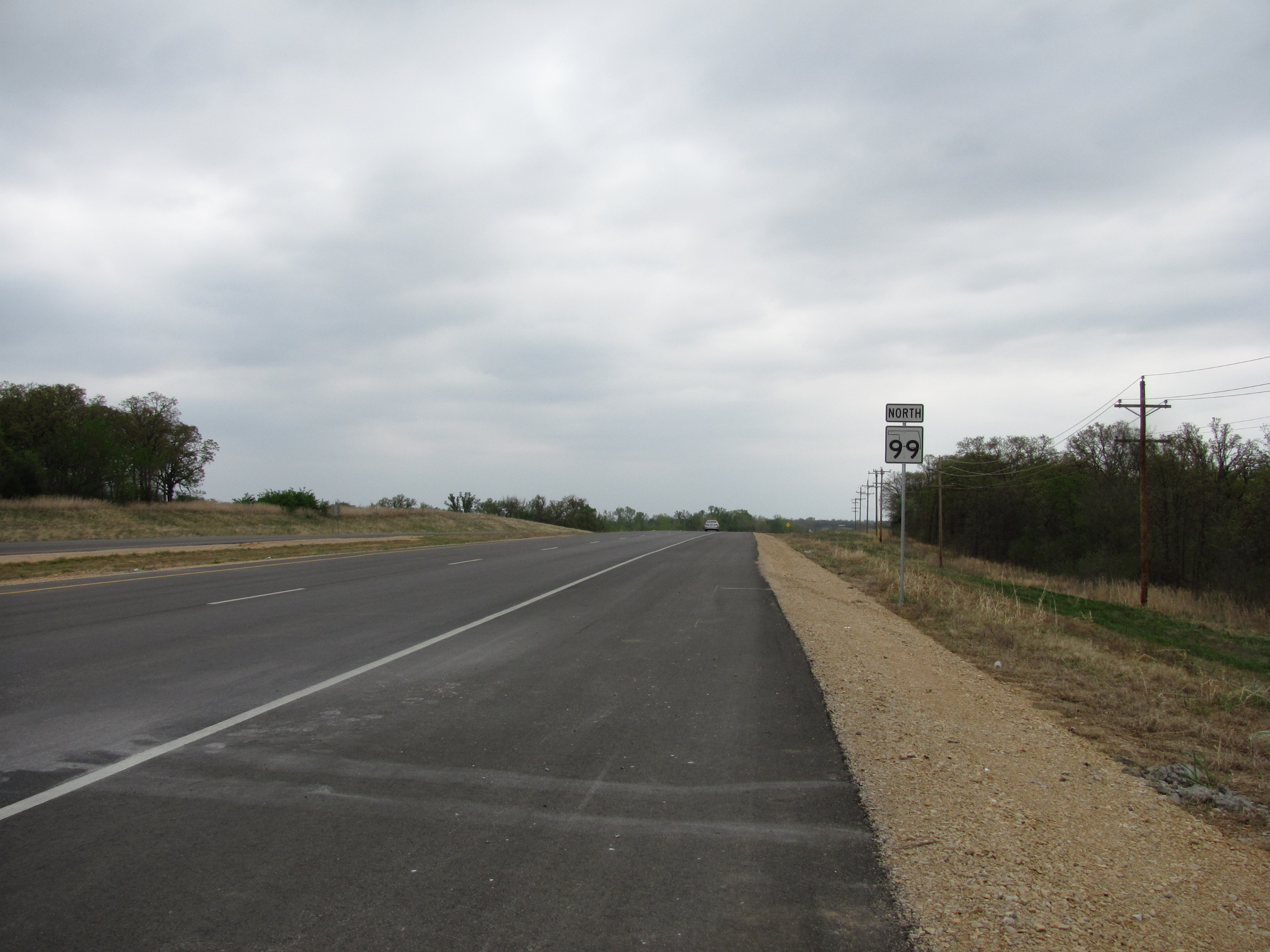
Northbound in Seminole, Oklahoma

State Highway 99 (SH-99) is a north–south state highway through central Oklahoma. It runs from the Texas state line at Lake Texoma to the Kansas state line near Lake Hulah. It is 241.5 miles (388.7 km) long. The highway overlaps U.S. Highway 377 (US-377) for over half its length.

SH-99 continues as K-99 after crossing the border into Kansas. This road continues for 233 miles (375 km) to the Nebraska border, where it becomes Nebraska Highway 99, which lasts an additional 14 miles (23 km). Thus, SH-99 is part of a triple-state highway numbered "99", which lasts a total of 488 miles (785 km).

SH-99 began as SH-48, a short highway connecting Ada to Holdenville. This highway was gradually expanded until it became a border-to-border route. In 1938, it was renumbered to match K-99, which was renumbered from K-11 the same day.

== Route description ==
=== US-377/SH-99 ===
US-377 crosses Lake Texoma on a bridge from Grayson County, Texas into Marshall County, Oklahoma. This is the southern terminus of SH-99, which will overlap with US-377 all the way to the U.S. Highway's northern terminus in Stroud, a distance of 139.91 miles (225.16 km). The highways' first junction in Oklahoma is with SH-32 seven miles (11 km) south of Madill. Five miles (8.0 km) north of this intersection, US-377/SH-99 serves as the northern terminus for SH-99C, a child route of SH-99. The route then heads into Madill, where it forms a brief concurrency with US-70 and SH-199. US-377/SH-99 heads northeast out of town and enters Johnston County.

West of Tishomingo, US-377/SH-99 picks up SH-22, which follows them east to the county seat. The same junction in Tishomingo where SH-22 splits away is also the northern terminus of SH-78. Eight miles (13 km) north of Tishomingo, the highway sharess a short concurrency with SH-7. US-377/SH-99 goes 18 miles (29 km) without another highway junction, which is with SH-99A, a spur to unincorporated Harden City.

The highway interchanges with SH-3, a freeway at this point, near Ahloso. US-377/SH-99 merges onto the freeway, which becomes the Richardson Loop around the west side of Ada. At the southwest corner of the loop, SH-1 joins. Two miles (3.2 km) further north, an interchange serves as the western terminus of SH-19; also at this interchange, SH-3 splits into SH-3E and SH-3W, the latter of which exits the highway to overlap with SH-19. At the next interchange, SH-1 splits off, and the freeway downgrades to expressway.

The highway crosses the Canadian River into Seminole County north of Byng. Just after the bridge, US-377/SH-3E/99 intersects SH-39 and SH-56; this is their eastern and western termini respectively. Near Bowlegs, SH-59 joins the concurrency, splitting off again after 3 miles (4.8 km). As the road enters Seminole, it has an interchange with US-270, where SH-3E splits off. SH-9 also is accessible by interchange in Seminole. US-377/SH-99 encounters another spur of the latter, SH-99A, in unincorporated Little. The routes then have an interchange at Interstate 40 (I-40), exit 200.

US-377/SH-99 crosses over the North Canadian River and cross a panhandle of Pottawatomie County before entering Lincoln County. Just north of the county line, the highway passes through Prague. The route does not encounter another highway for 19 miles (31 km), after which lies the town of Stroud, the northern terminus of US-377.

=== Stroud and the end of US-377 ===
In Stroud, SH-99 has two highway junctions, one of which is the northern terminus of US-377. In central Stroud, the highway meets SH-66, formerly the celebrated Route 66. An interchange with I-44 (Turner Turnpike) is 0.4 miles (0.64 km) north of the SH-66 junction.

Signage in Stroud is unclear on where the northern terminus of US-377 is, implying that it continues north of SH-66 to at least I-44. ODOT sources differ on where the northern terminus of the highway is. According to the Control Section Map Book, the north end of US-377 is at SH-66. Another map published by ODOT of Stroud implies that the route extends north of the ramps to and from I-44 to at least the bridge over the turnpike. The US-377 highway log shows US-377 ending at I-44. The inset strip map of the Turner Turnpike on the ODOT state map omits US-377 entirely.

=== North of Stroud ===
About 17 miles (27 km) north of Stroud, the now-independent SH-99 meets SH-33, which it overlaps for two miles (3.2 km) to the town of Drumright. SH-99 bypasses Drumright to the northwest, after which it meets up with an old alignment leading back to Drumright and SH-33, now numbered SH-99B but unsigned. After turning back north, it crosses the Cimarron River at Oilton, and has an interchange with the Cimarron Turnpike between Jennings and Hallett.

It is then concurrent with US-64 for six miles (9.7 km) before passing through Cleveland, where it crosses the Arkansas River. Throughout its final 55 miles (89 km), in Osage County, the highway passes through a relatively sparse region, though it meets SH-20 in Hominy and overlaps SH-11 south of Pawhuska (the county seat) and US-60 north of the city. Its final junction is with SH-10 10 miles (16 km) south of the Oklahoma–Kansas state line.

== History ==
=== The original SH-48 ===
1924-standard SH-48 and SH-99 shields

State Highway 99 traces its roots back to the first State Highway 48, which was first established on January 19, 1927. This highway connected Ada to Holdenville; it roughly followed present-day SH-99 until about two miles (3.2 km) north of the Canadian River, it then turned east and passed a mile (1.6 km) south of the unincorporated town of Vamoosa, after which it followed the route of today's SH-56. After 10 miles (16 km), it passed through Sasakwa, in which it turned north and ended at the original SH-3, at the intersection called "Five-Mile Corner", west of Holdenville. The 1928 state highway map shows the highway extended to SH-9 (now US-62) near Prague along the present-day SH-99 alignment, with the Canadian River crossing as a toll bridge. By January 1, 1929, the route had been realigned to pass through Konawa. The old designation between the Canadian River and SH-3 was replaced shortly after by SH-56.

In 1931, SH-48 was greatly expanded. The route was extended northward to US-66 in Stroud. At its southern end, it was extended along a new alignment, which began at SH-19, present day SH-3, southeast of Ada and ran through Tishomingo and Madill to end at the Red River northwest of Denison, Texas, where it met Texas State Highway 91. Also that year, a second section of SH-48 was established, taking over a large portion of what was then SH-25; the remainder of the route was integrated into US-60.

On March 1, 1932, a new section of road was designated as State Highway 48, connecting Stroud to SH-33 west of Drumright. As a result, the SH-48 designation was able to follow existing roads to link up with its previously-disconnected northern section. Thus, SH-48 became a border-to-border highway, linking Texas and its SH-91 to K-11 at the Kansas state line.

=== Renumbering and realignments ===
On May 17, 1938, both Kansas and Oklahoma renumbered K-11 and OK-48 respectively to bear the number 99, providing continuity between the states. At this time, SH-99 followed the same basic corridor of the present-day route from Madill north to Kansas. However, SH-48's designation was still in use from May 1938 to February 1941. The SH-48 designation was then made into the route passing through Konawa, which the SH-99 designation bypassed. After SH-48 was discontinued, however, it would only remain discussed for just under three years, SH-48 resurfacing for a route only 13 miles (21 km) east of SH-99. The portion of SH-48 from SH-99 to Konawa would later become part of SH-39.

In January 1944, Denison Dam was placed into operation, creating Lake Texoma. As a result, a portion of SH-99 between Madill and Texas was inundated. On May 5, 1958, the route was realigned to once again reach Texas; it now crossed a bridge further upstream, connecting to Texas State Highway 10, which was subsequently renumbered to Texas State Highway 99.

The existing route of SH-99 (concurrent with SH-3) veered west by about 4 miles (6.4 km) to once again serve the town of Konawa before cutting back northeast to continue the highway's previous heading. This was remedied on December 9, 1968, when the highway was changed to a straighter alignment bypassing Konawa. The old road heading west into Konawa became part of SH-39.

Another bypass occurred in 1977, this time in Drumright. SH-99 was changed to bypass the town on February 7, 1977, and the old alignment that was not part of SH-33 became SH-99B.

=== Designation as US 377 ===
The Oklahoma Department of Highways had proposed portions of State Highway 99 for inclusion in the United States Numbered Highway System several times. One such application made in 1953 suggested that the entirety of SH-99 become a U.S. Route, while another suggested a northern terminus at US 64 near Cleveland. On June 18, 1964, the American Association of State Highway Officials (AASHO, later the American Association of State Highway and Transpiration Officiations, AASHTO) accepted an extension of US 377 from the Texas state line 17 miles (25 km) to US 70 in Madill.

The Department of Highways, and later the Department of Transportation, submitted applications to extend US 377 from Madill to US 64 in Cleveland eight times between December 1964 and 1980, all of which were rejected for unknown reasons. In 1988, ODOT began signing US 377 from Madill to Stroud along SH-99 without AASHTO approval.

== Spurs ==
SH-99 has two lettered spurs:

- SH-99A is a designation for two distinct highways:
  - A connector highway from US-377/SH-99 to the unincorporated town of Harden City. It was originally known as SH-61A.
  - A highway that runs from west of Little, Oklahoma to SH-3E, east to SH-48 near Bearden.
- SH-99B has one previous and one present highway
  - A 1.09 miles (1.75 km)-long highway in Drumright, connecting SH-33 north to SH-99, forming the east edge of a loop around town. It is a former alignment of SH-99.
  - Former route commissioned in 1948 connecting Bowlegs to Wewoka. It was renumbered to SH-59 in 1965 to extend SH-59 from its former terminus 3 miles north of Bowlegs
- SH-99C connects US-377/SH-99 in Madill to SH-32 near Lake Texoma.
- SH-99D was a loop north of Hominy, Oklahoma serving the nearby state prison, Connors Correctional Center. The loop was decommissioned in the 1990s, and the bridge over Bird Creek is no longer passable.

== Junction list ==
All exits are unnumbered.

County	Location	mi	km	Destinations	Notes
Lake Texoma		0.0	0.0	US 377 south	Continuation into Texas; southern end of US-377 concurrency
Lake Texoma		0.0	0.0	Willis Bridge; Oklahoma–Texas line	
Marshall		9.2	14.8	SH-32 – Lebanon, Kingston	
Marshall		14.2	22.9	SH-99C south – Lebanon	Northern terminus of SH-99C
Marshall	Madill	16.0	25.7	US 70 east (1st Street south) – Kingston, Durant	Southern end of US-70 concurrency
Marshall	Madill	16.5	26.6	US 70 west / SH-199 west (1st Street north) – Mannsville, Ardmore	Northern end of US-70 concurrency; southern end of SH-199 concurrency
Marshall	Madill			SH-199 east – Little City	Northern end of SH-199 concurrency
Johnston	Tishomingo	29.1	46.8	SH-22 west – Ardmore	Southern end of SH-22 concurrency
Johnston	Tishomingo	30.2	48.6	SH-22 east / SH-78 south (Main Street)	Northern end of SH-22 concurrency
Johnston		38.8	62.4	SH-7 west – Reagan, Sulphur	Southern end of SH-7 concurrency
Johnston		39.7	63.9	SH-7 east – Atoka	Northern end of SH-7 concurrency
Pontotoc		57.4	92.4	SH-99A east	Western terminus of SH-99A
Pontotoc	Ahloso	65.6	105.6	SH-3 east – Coalgate, Atoka	Interchange; southern end of SH-3 concurrency; southern end of freeway section
Pontotoc	Ada			Stonecipher Boulevard	
Pontotoc	Ada	67.6	108.8	SH-3 west (J.A. Richardson Loop west) – Shawnee, Oklahoma City	Northbound left exit and southbound left entrance; northern end of freeway section; northern end of SH-3 concurrency
Pontotoc	Ada	70.2	113.0	SH-1 east – McAlester	Southern end of SH-1 concurrency
Pontotoc	Ada	72.2	116.2	SH-1 west / SH-3E (J.A. Richardson Loop south) to SH-3W / SH-19 – Pauls Valley, Shawnee	Interchange; northern end of SH-1 concurrency; southern end of SH-3E concurrency
Canadian River				Abbott-Haney Bridge	
Seminole		82.8	133.3	SH-39 west / SH-56 north – Konawa, Wewoka	Western terminus of SH-56; eastern terminus of SH-39
Seminole	Bowlegs	97.2	156.4	SH-59 east – Bowlegs, Wewoka	Southern end of SH-59 concurrency
Seminole		99.9	160.8	SH-59 west – Maud	Northern end of SH-59 concurrency
Seminole	Seminole	102.3	164.6	US 270 west / SH-3E (Broadway Avenue)	Northern end of SH-3E concurrency
Seminole	Seminole	103.9	167.2	SH-9 (Wrangler Boulevard) – Norman, Eufaula	
Seminole	Little	110.9	178.5	SH-99A – Shawnee, Cromwell	
Seminole		113.4	182.5	I-40 – Oklahoma City, Fort Smith	Exit 200 on I-40
North Canadian River				Seminole–Pottawatomie county line	
Lincoln	Prague	120.9	194.6	US 62 (Main Street)	
Lincoln	Stroud	139.5	224.5	SH-66 (Main Street)	Former US 66
Lincoln	Stroud	139.9	225.1	I-44 Toll / Turner Turnpike – Oklahoma City, Tulsa US 377 ends	Exit 179 on I-44 / Turnpike; northern terminus of US-377
Payne		156.0	251.1	SH-33 west – Cushing	Southern end of SH-33 concurrency
Creek	Drumright	158.1	254.4	SH-33 east – Drumright, Tulsa SH-33 Truck begins	Northern end of SH-33 concurrency; western terminus of SH-33 Truck
Creek	Drumright	160.4	258.1	SH-33 Truck east (SH-99B south) to SH-16	Northern end of SH-33 Truck concurrency
Creek		168.6	271.3	SH-51 – Yale, Stillwater, Mannford, Tulsa	
Pawnee		175.7	282.8	US 412 / Cimarron Turnpike – Enid, Tulsa	Exit 48 on US-412 / Turnpike
Pawnee		180.3	290.2	US 64 west – Pawnee	Southern end of US-64 concurrency
Pawnee	Cleveland	186.5	300.1	US 64 east to SH-48 – Tulsa	Northern end of US-64 concurrency
Arkansas River				Bridge	
Osage	Hominy	196.3	315.9	SH-20 – Fairfax, Skiatook	
Osage		210.0	338.0	SH-11 east – Barnsdall	Southern end of SH-11 concurrency
Osage	Pawhuska	215.3	346.5	US 60 west / SH-11 west – Pawhuska, Ponca City	Northern end of SH-11 concurrency; southern end of US-60 concurrency
Osage		220.8	355.3	US 60 east – Bartlesville	Northern end of US-60 concurrency
Osage		231.2	372.1	SH-10 east	Western terminus of SH-10
Osage		240.9	387.7	K-99 north	Continuation into Kansas
1.000 mi = 1.609 km; 1.000 km = 0.621 mi: Concurrency terminus; Electronic toll collection
