= National Register of Historic Places listings in Marshall County, Oklahoma =

Location of Marshall County in Oklahoma

This is a list of the National Register of Historic Places listings in Marshall County, Oklahoma.

This is intended to be a complete list of the properties on the National Register of Historic Places in Marshall County, Oklahoma, United States. The locations of National Register properties for which the latitude and longitude coordinates are included below, may be seen in a map.

There are 6 properties listed on the National Register in the county.

This National Park Service list is complete through NPS recent listings posted March 21, 2025.

== Current listings ==
	Name on the Register	Image	Date listed	Location	City or town	Description
1	James H. Bounds Barn		December 18, 2013 (#13000941)	Williams Rd. & OK 70; 34°00′49″N 96°45′45″W	Kingston vicinity	
2	Haley's Point Site		May 24, 1991 (#91000613)	Address Restricted	Lebanon	
3	Marshall County Courthouse	Marshall County Courthouse	August 23, 1984 (#84003154)	100 E. Main St. 34°05′27″N 96°46′14″W	Madill	
4	Oakland School		June 14, 2016 (#16000373)	NW. corner of Fern & N. 8th Sts. 34°06′09″N 96°47′40″W	Oakland	
5	United States Post Office Madill	United States Post Office Madill	April 17, 2009 (#09000216)	223 W. Lillie Boulevard; 34°05′25″N 96°46′22″W	Madill	
6	Worth Hotel	Worth Hotel	April 12, 1985 (#85000846)	203 E. Main St. 34°05′28″N 96°46′12″W	Madill	

== See also ==
- List of National Historic Landmarks in Oklahoma
- National Register of Historic Places listings in Oklahoma
