= Willis, Oklahoma =

- Unincorporated community
- Location within Oklahoma Location within the United States
- Coordinates: 33°53′08″N 96°49′45″W
- Country: United States
- State: Oklahoma
- County: Marshall
- Elevation: 689 ft (210 m)
- Time zone: UTC-6 (Central (CST))
  - Summer (DST): UTC-5 (CDT)
- ZIP Code: 73439 (Kingston)
- Area code: 580
- GNIS feature ID: 1099845

Willis is an unincorporated community in Marshall County, Oklahoma, United States. Willis is located in the far southern portion of the county near Lake Texoma and is 14.5 miles (23.3 km) south-southwest of Madill. U.S. Route 377 passes near the community to the west.

== History ==
The community of Willis was settled in 1843 when James Hamilton Willis and his wife, Amanda, a Chickasaw family, emigrated to Indian Territory. They built their house and a store east of what later became the site of Willis Bridge. The community that grew up around them became known as Willis. Their son, Raleigh "Brit" Willis, is credited with persuading the federal government to open a post office at Willis on March 15, 1856. According to the Marshall County Genealogical and Historical Society, the post office was established on March 15, 1866, and was discontinued on February 8, 1974. Willis became a successful farming community. The principal crops were corn, cotton, sugar cane, peanuts and peas. Cattle, hogs, chickens and turkeys were also raised in the area. The community soon had a grist mill, a cotton gin and a blacksmith shop. A ferry was established to cross the Red River, enabling the people of the Willis area to trade in Denison and Sherman, Texas.

The decision to construct Lake Texoma meant that the site of Willis would be inundated, along with over 97,000 acres (39,000 ha) of farmland in the Willis Valley. Houses and barns belonging to more than 40 families were moved or destroyed between 1941 and 1945. By 1945, only one store remained, which included the local post office. The post office moved 0.5 miles (0.8 km) north and resumed business until it was closed in May, 1946.
