= Cumberland, Oklahoma =

Unincorporated community in Oklahoma, US

- Census-designated place
- Location within Oklahoma Location within the United States
- Coordinates: 34°03′53″N 96°35′59″W
- Country: United States
- State: Oklahoma
- County: Marshall

Area
  - Total: 1.37 sq mi (3.5 km^{2})
  - Land: 1.27 sq mi (3.3 km^{2})
  - Water: 0.09 sq mi (0.23 km^{2})
- Elevation: 722 ft (220 m)

Population (2020)
  - Total: 315
  - Density: 247.3/sq mi (95.5/km^{2})
- Time zone: UTC-6 (Central (CST))
  - Summer (DST): UTC-5 (CDT)
- ZIP Code: 73446 (Madill)
- Area code: 580
- FIPS code: 40-18750
- GNIS feature ID: 1091884

Cumberland is an unincorporated community and census-designated place in Marshall County, Oklahoma, United States. The population was 315 as of the 2020 Census.

== History ==
A post office was established at Cumberland, Indian Territory, on March 31, 1894. It was named for Cumberland Presbyterian Church, an organization active in local mission work.

At the time of its founding, Cumberland was located in Pickens County, Chickasaw Nation.

== Geography ==
Cumberland is in eastern Marshall County, about 12 miles (19 km) east of Madill, the county seat. It is 1.5 miles (2.4 km) south of Oklahoma State Highway 199 and is west of the Washita River arm of Lake Texoma.

According to the U.S. Census Bureau, the Cumberland CDP has a total area of 1.37 square miles (3.55 km^{2}), of which 1.27 square miles (3.29 km^{2}) are land and 0.09 square miles (0.23 km^{2}) are water. Texoma Shores Resort (formerly known as Cumberland Cove) is the community's main tourism driver, where fishing and swimming are the primary activities of interest.

== Demographics ==
=== 2020 census ===
As of the 2020 census, Cumberland had a population of 315. The median age was 47.2 years. 16.5% of residents were under the age of 18 and 19.0% of residents were 65 years of age or older. For every 100 females there were 93.3 males, and for every 100 females age 18 and over there were 90.6 males age 18 and over.

0.0% of residents lived in urban areas, while 100.0% lived in rural areas.

There were 133 households in Cumberland, of which 33.8% had children under the age of 18 living in them. Of all households, 44.4% were married-couple households, 30.1% were households with a male householder and no spouse or partner present, and 21.1% were households with a female householder and no spouse or partner present. About 35.4% of all households were made up of individuals and 13.5% had someone living alone who was 65 years of age or older.

There were 199 housing units, of which 33.2% were vacant. The homeowner vacancy rate was 6.4% and the rental vacancy rate was 22.2%.

Racial composition as of the 2020 census
Race	Number	Percent
White	258	81.9%
Black or African American	1	0.3%
American Indian and Alaska Native	27	8.6%
Asian	0	0.0%
Native Hawaiian and Other Pacific Islander	0	0.0%
Some other race	1	0.3%
Two or more races	28	8.9%
Hispanic or Latino (of any race)	17	5.4%
