= McMillan, Oklahoma =

- Unincorporated community
- Location within Oklahoma Location within the United States
- Coordinates: 34°05′23″N 96°56′14″W
- Country: United States
- State: Oklahoma
- County: Marshall
- Elevation: 758 ft (231 m)
- Time zone: UTC-6 (Central (CST))
  - Summer (DST): UTC-5 (CDT)
- ZIP Code: 73446 (Madill)
- Area code: 580
- GNIS feature ID: 1100621

McMillan is an unincorporated community in Marshall County, Oklahoma, United States. McMillan is located south of U.S. Route 70 in the western part of the county, 9.5 miles (15.3 km) west of Madill.

A post office was established at McMillan, Indian Territory on March 28, 1892. It was named for Joseph E.A. McMillan, first postmaster.

At the time of its founding, McMillan was located in Pickens County, Chickasaw Nation.
