= Oklahoma State Highway 199 =

State highway in Oklahoma, United States

State Highway 199

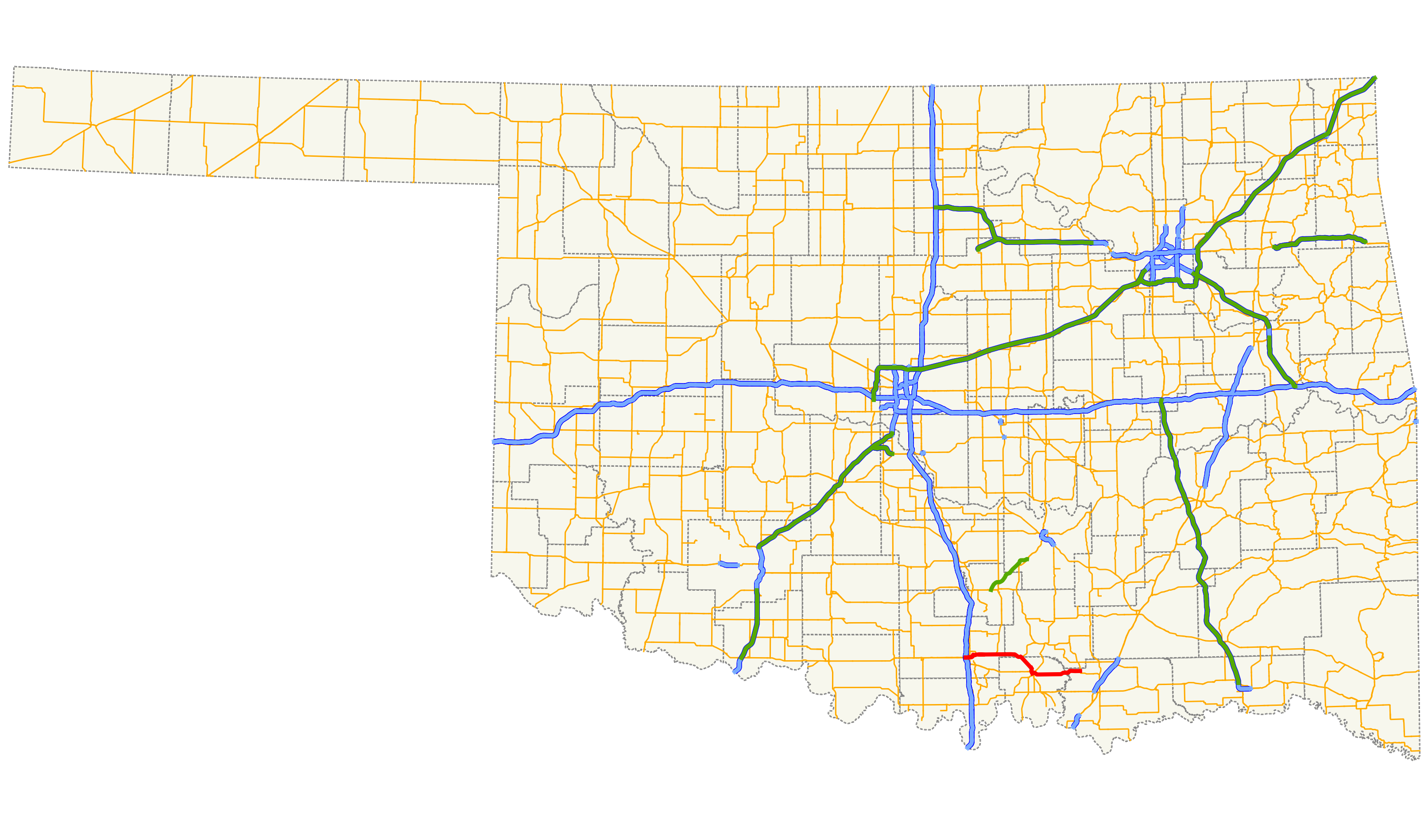

Route information
- Maintained by ODOT
- Length: 39.8 mi (64.1 km)
- Existed: October 13, 1938–present

Major junctions
- West end: SH-142 in Ardmore
- US 177 from Dickson to Madill; SH-1 near Russett; US 70 / US 377 / SH-99 in Madill
- East end: SH-78 near Brown

Location
- Country: United States
- State: Oklahoma

Highway system
- Oklahoma State Highway System; Interstate; US; State; Turnpikes
| ← US 183 | → SH-209 |

State Highway 199, also known as SH-199 or, is a 39.8-mile (64.1 km) highway in southern Oklahoma. The highway connects Ardmore to Madill as a more northerly alternate to US-70, much of which SH-199 is an old alignment of. It provides access to the Fort Washita Historic Site.

== Route description ==
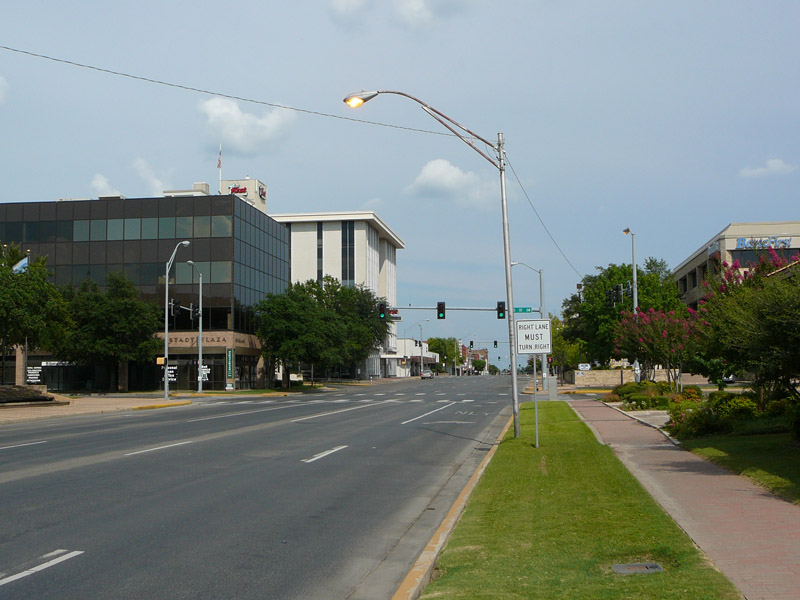
SH-199 in Ardmore

The highway's western beginning is at SH-142 in Ardmore. This intersection is also the eastern terminus of SH-142. After leaving Ardmore, the highway continues along a due east course that takes it through the unincorporated places of Dripping Springs and Caldwell Hill. At Dickson it becomes concurrent with US-177. Shortly after this junction, the two highways cross into Johnston County, where they pass through the town of Mannsville. The routes then turn southeast into Marshall County. Just after the county line lies the southern terminus of SH-1, which leads back into Johnston County.

US-177/SH-199 continue southeast into Madill, the county seat of Marshall County. On the north side of town, they meet US-70; this point is the southern terminus of US-177. SH-199 continues along US-70 to US-377/SH-99, where it heads back east. SH-199 splits off on its own as it leaves Madill.

SH-199 continues east, passing through the unincorporated settlement of Little City. It then crosses over the Washita River arm of Lake Texoma. The highway then passes the Fort Washita historic site before ending near Brown, Oklahoma at SH-78.

== History ==
State Highway 199 was formed from a portion of SH-32 between Marietta and Madill. This stretch of the highway was split off from SH-32 on October 13, 1938.

The portion of SH-199 between Madill and the current southern terminus of SH-99C was returned to SH-32 on September 16, 1946.

On July 7, 1984, US-70 was relocated between Interstate 35 (I-35) in Ardmore and Madill, shifting it south onto its present-day alignment. Between 1984 and 2018, its western terminus was at I-35 exit 31. From there, it followed W. Broadway Street into Ardmore. At Commerce Street, the highway intersected US-77. SH-199 continued east along Broadway into downtown, where the highway split along a one-way pair; westbound SH-199 followed W. Broadway, while eastbound traffic was shunted onto W. Main Street. SH-199 turned north along Washington Street and followed it to Sam Noble Parkway, where it turned back to the east.

On March 5, 2018, the section of SH-199 between I-35 and SH-142 was removed from the state highway system.

== Junction list ==
| County | Location | mi | km | Destinations | Notes |
|---|---|---|---|---|---|
| Carter | Ardmore | 0.0 | 0.0 | SH-142 | Western terminus, eastern terminus of SH-142 |
| Carter | Dickson | 7.0 | 11.3 | US 177 | Western end of US-177 concurrency |
| Johnston | No major junctions | | | | |
| Marshall | | 16.0 | 25.7 | SH-1 | Western terminus of SH-1 |
| Marshall | Madill | 22.2 | 35.7 | US 70 / US 177 | Southern terminus of US-177, northern end of US-70 concurrency |
| Marshall | Madill | 22.8 | 36.7 | US 70 / US 377 / SH-99 | Southern end of US-70 concurrency, western end of US-377/SH-99 concurrency |
| Marshall | Madill | 23.3 | 37.5 | US 377 / SH-99 | Eastern end of US-377/SH-99 concurrency |
| Bryan | | 39.8 | 64.1 | SH-78 | Eastern terminus |
1.000 mi = 1.609 km; 1.000 km = 0.621 mi: Concurrency terminus
