= Lebanon, Oklahoma =

- Census-designated place
- Location within Oklahoma Location within the United States
- Coordinates: 33°58′25″N 96°55′03″W
- Country: United States
- State: Oklahoma
- County: Marshall

Area
  - Total: 4.07 sq mi (10.55 km^{2})
  - Land: 3.09 sq mi (8.01 km^{2})
  - Water: 0.98 sq mi (2.54 km^{2})
- Elevation: 653 ft (199 m)

Population (2020)
  - Total: 210
  - Density: 67.9/sq mi (26.22/km^{2})
- Time zone: UTC-6 (Central (CST))
  - Summer (DST): UTC-5 (CDT)
- ZIP Code: 73440
- Area code: 580
- FIPS code: 40-41950
- GNIS feature ID: 2629927

Lebanon is a census-designated place (CDP) and unincorporated community in Marshall County, Oklahoma, United States. It has a post office with the ZIP code 73440. As of the 2020 census, the population was 210.

== History ==
Lebanon was settled in the late 19th century as part of the Chickasaw Indian Nation and was part of Pickens County. A Chickasaw tribal courthouse was located in Lebanon. About a mile to the east of Hauani Creek is the remains of the Burney School, a tribal school operated by the Chickasaws.

== Geography ==
Lebanon is in southwestern Marshall County at the western end of Lake Texoma, near where the Red River enters the lake. It is bordered to the west by Love County, Oklahoma, and to the south, across the lake, by Grayson County, Texas. Madill, the Marshall county seat, is 13 miles (21 km) to the northeast. Oklahoma State Highway 32 passes through the community, leading east 11 miles (18 km) to Kingston and west 13 miles (21 km) to Marietta.

According to the U.S. Census Bureau, the Lebanon CDP has a total area of 4.07 square miles (10.54 km^{2}), of which 3.09 square miles (8.00 km^{2}) are land and 0.98 square miles (2.54 km^{2}), or 24.1%, are water. The water area includes the main stem of Lake Texoma as well as Hauani Creek, an arm of the lake forming the eastern border of the community.

== Demographics ==
Historical population
Census	Pop.	Note	%±
2010	303		—
2020	210		−30.7%
U.S. Decennial Census

=== 2020 census ===
As of the 2020 census, Lebanon had a population of 210. The median age was 58.4 years. 12.4% of residents were under the age of 18 and 40.5% of residents were 65 years of age or older. For every 100 females there were 112.1 males, and for every 100 females age 18 and over there were 100.0 males age 18 and over.

0.0% of residents lived in urban areas, while 100.0% lived in rural areas.

There were 102 households in Lebanon, of which 40.2% had children under the age of 18 living in them. Of all households, 64.7% were married-couple households, 12.7% were households with a male householder and no spouse or partner present, and 14.7% were households with a female householder and no spouse or partner present. About 14.7% of all households were made up of individuals and 7.8% had someone living alone who was 65 years of age or older.

There were 121 housing units, of which 15.7% were vacant. The homeowner vacancy rate was 0.0% and the rental vacancy rate was 10.0%.

Racial composition as of the 2020 census
Race	Number	Percent
White	166	79.0%
Black or African American	0	0.0%
American Indian and Alaska Native	26	12.4%
Asian	0	0.0%
Native Hawaiian and Other Pacific Islander	0	0.0%
Some other race	8	3.8%
Two or more races	10	4.8%
Hispanic or Latino (of any race)	10	4.8%

=== 2010 census ===
As of the 2010 census, Lebanon had a population of 303.

=== 2000 census ===
As of the census of 2000, the population of the ZCTA for ZIP Code 73440, covering more area than the current CDP, was 327.

== Economy ==
Lebanon is primarily a farming area. There is one Dollar General, a gas station, and a few other small businesses.
