= Oakland Oaks =

Oakland Oaks may refer to one of the following sport teams, listed chronologically:

- Oakland Oaks (PCL), a minor league baseball team that played in the Pacific Coast League from 1903 to 1955
- Oakland Oaks (ice hockey), a professional ice hockey team that played in the Pacific Coast Hockey League from 1944 to 1949
- Oakland Oaks (ABL), a professional basketball team that played in the American Basketball League during the 1962–1963 season
- Oakland Oaks (ABA), a professional basketball team that played in the American Basketball Association during the 1967–68 and 1968–69 seasons

See also

- Oakland, Oklahoma
