= Gary E. Payne =

American politician

Gary Edison Payne (October 31, 1944 - August 27, 2013) was the Chief Administrative Law Judge for the Oklahoma State Department of Health. He was born in Denison, Texas to Thomas Edison Payne and Myrtle Jeanne Landram Payne. Married to the former Susie Farris, Payne has 3 adult sons. He resided in Oklahoma City, Oklahoma.

Payne graduated from Madill High School, Madill, Oklahoma. He had a B.S. from Oklahoma State University and a J.D. from the University of Oklahoma.

Payne was elected to the Oklahoma House of Representatives in 1968 and was the youngest member of the House during his first term. He served a total of 4 terms in the Oklahoma legislature.

Other public service included an appointment as a City of Oklahoma City Municipal Judge in 2012, a Commissioner of the Oklahoma City Game and Fish Commission from 2008 to 2012, serving as a member of the Board of Education for the Edmond, Oklahoma Public Schools from 1991 to 1996 and being appointed by the governor of Oklahoma to two terms on the Oklahoma Employment Security Commission Board of Review (1979 to 1989).

== Publications ==
Payne authored the Desk Manual For Oklahoma Administrative Law Judges and Hearing Officers. (Second addition Nov. 1, 2009)

Other publications authored by Judge Payne include:

- The Oklahoma Employment Security Act, A Primer For Practicing Attorneys. Oklahoma Bar Association Journal, September 1984. [Golden Quill Award by OBA for best article of the year],
- Estate Planning: Not Just for the Rich, Famous and Old, Part 1 & 2, Oklahoma Women's/Men's Magazine, March and April, 2007.
- A Primer on Administrative Law in Oklahoma, Oklahoma Bar Association Journal, January 14, 2008
- “They Aren’t Just Nursing Homes Anymore” A Birds-eye View of Licensed Nursing Care Facilities in Oklahoma, Oklahoma County Bar Association BRIEFCASE, April, 2008.
- Pocket Guide to Obtaining Vital Records in Oklahoma. Oklahoma Bar Association Journal, Nov. 8, 2008.
- Time: No Do-Overs, No Mulligans, Oklahoma Senior News Magazine, November 2008.
- How To Choose a Counselor To Testify, A Digest of Oklahoma Law. Oklahoma County Bar Association BRIEFCASE, December, 2009.
