= Little, Oklahoma =

Populated place in Oklahoma, US

Little
- Unincorporated community
- Location in Oklahoma
- Coordinates: 35°20′53″N 96°40′19″W
- Country: United States
- State: Oklahoma
- County: Seminole
- Elevation: 968 ft (295 m)

Little is an unincorporated community in Seminole County, Oklahoma, United States, located at an elevation of 968 feet. It lies north of the City of Seminole and east of Shawnee, Oklahoma, near the intersection of U.S. Route 377 and Oklahoma State Highway 99A, just south of Interstate 40.

== History ==
Little was named for Thomas Little, a prominent member and second chief of the Seminole Nation of Oklahoma. The community developed in the early 1900s during the period of Indian Territory transition to statehood. A post office operated in Little from August 14, 1902, until November 30, 1916, serving as a hub for mail and trade in northern Seminole County.

The area was historically part of the Seminole Nation lands allotted after the Dawes Act and subsequent agreements. The Seminole established schools such as Mekasukey Academy and Emahaka Academy nearby, which influenced settlement patterns.

== Cemetery and Present Status ==
The nearby Little Cemetery dates back to the 1890s and is one of the largest free cemeteries in the United States, with over 8,500 recorded burials. The cemetery began as a family burial ground and expanded as the community grew. Today, Little remains a rural settlement with scattered homes, farmland, and oil lease roads. It is accessible via U.S. Route 377 and serves as a waypoint between Seminole and Shawnee.

== Transportation ==
Little is located near major transportation routes, including Interstate 40, U.S. Route 377, and Oklahoma State Highway 99A, which connect it to regional trade centers and historic oil-field communities.

== See also ==
- Seminole County, Oklahoma
- Seminole Nation of Oklahoma
- Ghost towns in Oklahoma
- Mekasukey Academy
- Emahaka Academy
