= Texoma Council of Governments =

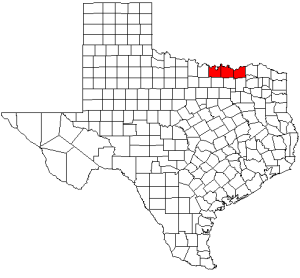
- Map of Texas highlighting counties served by the Texoma Council of Governments
- Formation: January 1968
- Type: Voluntary association of governments
- Region served: 2,736 sq mi (7,090 km^{2})
- Members: 3 counties

Historical population
Year	Pop.	±%
2000	178,200	—
2008	193,467	+8.6%

The Texoma Council of Governments (TCOG) is a voluntary association of cities, counties and special districts in North Texas.

Based in Sherman, the Texoma Council of Governments is a member of the Texas Association of Regional Councils. It is also a part of the Texoma region.

== Counties served ==
- Cooke
- Fannin
- Grayson

== Largest cities in the region ==
- Sherman
- Denison
- Gainesville
- Bonham
