= McBride, Oklahoma =

- Census-designated place
- Location within Oklahoma Location within the United States
- Coordinates: 33°56′07″N 96°38′15″W
- Country: United States
- State: Oklahoma
- County: Marshall

Area
  - Total: 0.47 sq mi (1.22 km^{2})
  - Land: 0.43 sq mi (1.12 km^{2})
  - Water: 0.039 sq mi (0.10 km^{2})

Population (2020)
  - Total: 128
  - Density: 295.6/sq mi (114.1/km^{2})
- Time zone: UTC-6 (Central (CST))
  - Summer (DST): UTC-5 (CDT)
- ZIP Code: 73439 (Kingston)
- Area code: 580
- FIPS code: 40-44900

McBride is an unincorporated community and census-designated place (CDP) in Marshall County, Oklahoma, United States. It is located about 7 miles (11 km) southeast of Kingston along Oklahoma State Highway 70A. The population was 128 as of the 2020 census.

== Demographics ==
Historical population
Census	Pop.	Note	%±
2020	128		—
U.S. Decennial Census

=== 2020 census ===
As of the 2020 census, McBride had a population of 128. The median age was 60.4 years. 13.3% of residents were under the age of 18 and 36.7% of residents were 65 years of age or older. For every 100 females there were 85.5 males, and for every 100 females age 18 and over there were 82.0 males age 18 and over.

0.0% of residents lived in urban areas, while 100.0% lived in rural areas.

There were 70 households in McBride, of which 28.6% had children under the age of 18 living in them. Of all households, 52.9% were married-couple households, 2.9% were households with a male householder and no spouse or partner present, and 31.4% were households with a female householder and no spouse or partner present. About 17.1% of all households were made up of individuals and 7.1% had someone living alone who was 65 years of age or older.

There were 75 housing units, of which 6.7% were vacant. The homeowner vacancy rate was 0.0% and the rental vacancy rate was 0.0%.

Racial composition as of the 2020 census
Race	Number	Percent
White	99	77.3%
Black or African American	2	1.6%
American Indian and Alaska Native	2	1.6%
Asian	0	0.0%
Native Hawaiian and Other Pacific Islander	0	0.0%
Some other race	2	1.6%
Two or more races	23	18.0%
Hispanic or Latino (of any race)	4	3.1%
