= New Woodville, Oklahoma =

- Town
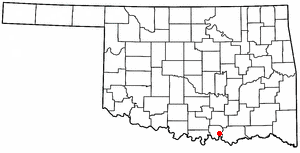
- Location of New Woodville, Oklahoma
- Coordinates: 33°58′7″N 96°39′15″W
- Country: United States
- State: Oklahoma
- County: Marshall

Area
  - Total: 0.11 sq mi (0.28 km^{2})
  - Land: 0.11 sq mi (0.28 km^{2})
  - Water: 0 sq mi (0.00 km^{2})
- Elevation: 748 ft (228 m)

Population (2020)
  - Total: 60
  - Density: 562.2/sq mi (217.08/km^{2})
- Time zone: UTC-6 (Central (CST))
  - Summer (DST): UTC-5 (CDT)
- FIPS code: 40-82100
- GNIS feature ID: 1100004

New Woodville is a town in Marshall County, Oklahoma, United States. The population was 60 as of the 2020 Census. Listed erroneously by the Census Bureau as "Woodville" from 1980 to 2000, the town's name was corrected in Census Bureau listings in 2005. Proposals to annex the unincorporated areas of New Woodville and McBride on the shores of Lake Texoma were considered in the past.

== History ==
The original town of Woodville was established as Harney, with its post office opening November 8, 1881. It was renamed Woodville on July 9, 1888 in honor of local settler L.L. Wood. Construction of a St. Louis and San Francisco Railway affiliate through the area in 1900 stimulated growth, with the town having 3 newspapers, a grain elevator, and cotton gins, resulting in a community with a school and nine brick buildings. It was incorporated as a town between 1900 and 1907. That original Woodville, having approximately 300 residents, was dissolved around 1943 or 1944 when the area was flooded due to the Red River being dammed by Denison Dam to create Lake Texoma. The town of New Woodville was incorporated, with around 50 of the former Woodville residents moving to the new location about two miles north of the original townsite. New Woodville disincorporated for brief periods in the late 90s or the early 2000s, but has legally existed since 2002 although the town government has been inactive.

The drought of 2013 reduced the level of Lake Texoma sufficiently to expose some of old Woodville's foundations and storm cellars.

== Geography ==
New Woodville is located at 33°58′7″N 96°39′15″W (33.968724, -96.654078).

According to the United States Census Bureau, the town has a total area of 0.1 square miles (0.26 km^{2}), all land.

The town is southeast of Kingston, Oklahoma, just off Oklahoma State Highway 70A.

Armstrong Road, Durham Street, and Lee Ann Drive are north of the BNSF tracks which do not have a bypass because they do not connect to any other streets.

== Demographics ==
Historical population
Census	Pop.	Note	%±
1910	389		—
1920	443		13.9%
1930	353		−20.3%
1940	364		3.1%
1950	78		−78.6%
1960	98		25.6%
1970	118		20.4%
1980	94		−20.3%
1990	31		−67.0%
2000	69		122.6%
2010	132		91.3%
2020	60		−54.5%
U.S. Decennial Census

=== 2020 census ===
As of the 2020 census, New Woodville had a population of 60. The median age was 47.3 years. 16.7% of residents were under the age of 18 and 30.0% of residents were 65 years of age or older. For every 100 females there were 66.7 males, and for every 100 females age 18 and over there were 78.6 males age 18 and over.

0.0% of residents lived in urban areas, while 100.0% lived in rural areas.

There were 20 households in New Woodville, of which 10.0% had children under the age of 18 living in them. Of all households, 45.0% were married-couple households, 15.0% were households with a male householder and no spouse or partner present, and 40.0% were households with a female householder and no spouse or partner present. About 35.0% of all households were made up of individuals and 25.0% had someone living alone who was 65 years of age or older.

There were 29 housing units, of which 31.0% were vacant. The homeowner vacancy rate was 0.0% and the rental vacancy rate was 0.0%.

Racial composition as of the 2020 census
Race	Number	Percent
White	39	65.0%
Black or African American	0	0.0%
American Indian and Alaska Native	10	16.7%
Asian	0	0.0%
Native Hawaiian and Other Pacific Islander	0	0.0%
Some other race	1	1.7%
Two or more races	10	16.7%
Hispanic or Latino (of any race)	4	6.7%

=== 2000 census ===
As of the census of 2000, there were 69 people, 27 households, and 18 families residing in the town. The population density was 605.8 inhabitants per square mile (233.9/km^{2}). There were 37 housing units at an average density of 324.9 per square mile (125.4/km^{2}). The racial makeup of the town was 98.55% White and 1.45% Native American. Hispanic or Latino of any race were 2.90% of the population.

There were 27 households, out of which 37.0% had children under the age of 18 living with them, 44.4% were married couples living together, 18.5% had a female householder with no husband present, and 33.3% were non-families. 33.3% of all households were made up of individuals, and 11.1% had someone living alone who was 65 years of age or older. The average household size was 2.56 and the average family size was 3.00.

In the town, the population was spread out, with 34.8% under the age of 18, 2.9% from 18 to 24, 33.3% from 25 to 44, 21.7% from 45 to 64, and 7.2% who were 65 years of age or older. The median age was 31 years. For every 100 females, there were 86.5 males. For every 100 females age 18 and over, there were 125.0 males.

The median income for a household in the town was $9,375, and the median income for a family was $9,375. Males had a median income of $15,625 versus $18,750 for females. The per capita income for the town was $5,438. There were 52.9% of families and 47.5% of the population living below the poverty line, including 36.8% are under age 18 and 57.1% of those over age 64.
