= Tishomingo National Wildlife Refuge =

National wildlife refuge in Oklahoma

- IUCN category IV (habitat/species management area)
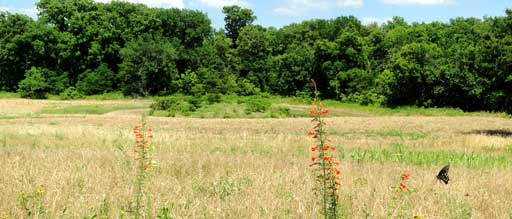
- Rain Crow Pond

- Location within the United States
- Location: Johnston, Marshall counties, Oklahoma, United States
- Coordinates: 34°10′30″N 96°39′00″W
- Area: 16,464 acres (66.63 km^{2})
- Established: 1946
- Governing body: U.S. Fish and Wildlife Service
- Website: Tishomingo National Wildlife Refuge

The Tishomingo National Wildlife Refuge is a National Wildlife Refuge of the United States located in Oklahoma. It is in southern Johnston and northeastern Marshall Counties in the eastern part of the state, near the upper Washita arm of Lake Texoma.

The refuge was established in 1946 and contains 16,464 acres (66.3 km^{2}) of protected land managed by the Fish and Wildlife Service.

== Purpose ==
The purpose of this wildlife refuge is to protect wildlife as well as the land and plants. Hunting and fishing are allowed with the appropriate licenses.

No entrance fee is required. The refuge headquarters on site has maps, brochures, and more history and information over the refuge.
