= Dripping Springs, Carter County, Oklahoma =

Unincorporated community in Oklahoma, US

Dripping Springs, Oklahoma
- Unincorporated community
- Location within the state of Oklahoma Dripping Springs (the United States)
- Coordinates: 34°11′13″N 97°2′18″W
- Country: United States
- State: Oklahoma
- County: Carter
- Elevation: 824 ft (251 m)
- Time zone: UTC-6 (Central (CST))
  - Summer (DST): UTC-5 (CDT)
- GNIS feature ID: 1092194

Dripping Springs is a small unincorporated rural community in Carter County, Oklahoma, United States. The community is stretched out along State Highway 199 east of Ardmore.
