= Harden City, Oklahoma =

Harden City
- Unincorporated community
- Location within the state of Oklahoma Harden City (the United States)
- Coordinates: 34°36′26″N 96°35′59″W
- Country: United States
- State: Oklahoma
- County: Pontotoc
- Elevation: 797 ft (243 m)
- Time zone: UTC-6 (Central (CST))
  - Summer (DST): UTC-5 (CDT)
- GNIS feature ID: 1093527

Harden City is an unincorporated community in Pontotoc County, Oklahoma, United States. The community is located 11 miles south of Ada. It was named after community resident Andrew Harden.
