= Little City, Oklahoma =

- Census-designated place
- Location within Oklahoma Location within the United States
- Coordinates: 34°05′02″N 96°36′58″W
- Country: United States
- State: Oklahoma
- County: Marshall

Area
  - Total: 0.40 sq mi (1.03 km^{2})
  - Land: 0.40 sq mi (1.03 km^{2})
  - Water: 0 sq mi (0.00 km^{2})
- Elevation: 742 ft (226 m)

Population (2020)
  - Total: 136
  - Density: 340.85/sq mi (131.60/km^{2})
- Time zone: UTC-6 (Central (CST))
  - Summer (DST): UTC-5 (CDT)
- ZIP Code: 73446 (Madill)
- Area code: 580
- FIPS code: 40-43400
- GNIS feature ID: 2812856

Little City is an unincorporated community and census-designated place (CDP) in Marshall County, Oklahoma, United States. It was first listed as a CDP at the 2020 census, when it had a population of 136.

The CDP is in northeastern Marshall County, along Oklahoma State Highway 199, 9 miles (14 km) east of Madill, the county seat, and 20 miles (32 km) northwest of Durant.

== Demographics ==
Historical population
Census	Pop.	Note	%±
2020	136		—
U.S. Decennial Census

=== 2020 census ===
As of the 2020 census, Little City had a population of 136. The median age was 48.0 years. 24.3% of residents were under the age of 18 and 28.7% of residents were 65 years of age or older. For every 100 females there were 61.9 males, and for every 100 females age 18 and over there were 49.3 males age 18 and over.

0.0% of residents lived in urban areas, while 100.0% lived in rural areas.

There were 55 households in Little City, of which 20.0% had children under the age of 18 living in them. Of all households, 54.5% were married-couple households, 34.5% were households with a male householder and no spouse or partner present, and 9.1% were households with a female householder and no spouse or partner present. About 21.8% of all households were made up of individuals and 10.9% had someone living alone who was 65 years of age or older.

There were 70 housing units, of which 21.4% were vacant. The homeowner vacancy rate was 0.0% and the rental vacancy rate was 0.0%.

Racial composition as of the 2020 census
Race	Number	Percent
White	99	72.8%
Black or African American	0	0.0%
American Indian and Alaska Native	13	9.6%
Asian	0	0.0%
Native Hawaiian and Other Pacific Islander	0	0.0%
Some other race	10	7.4%
Two or more races	14	10.3%
Hispanic or Latino (of any race)	23	16.9%
