= Brown, Oklahoma =

Unincorporated community in Oklahoma, US

Brown
- Unincorporated community
- Location within the state of Oklahoma Brown (the United States)
- Coordinates: 34°05′20″N 96°28′49″W
- Country: United States
- State: Oklahoma
- County: Bryan
- Time zone: UTC-6 (Central (CST))
  - Summer (DST): UTC-5 (CDT)
- Area code: 580
- GNIS feature ID: 1100238

Brown is an unincorporated community in Bryan County, Oklahoma, United States. It is located 13 miles northwest of Durant. Brown had a post office from July 3, 1913 until July 15, 1927. It was named after its first postmaster, Robert H. Brown.
