= Mannsville, Oklahoma =

- Town
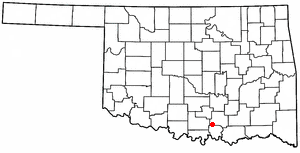
- Location of Mannsville, Oklahoma
- Coordinates: 34°11′07″N 96°53′52″W
- Country: United States
- State: Oklahoma
- County: Johnston

Area
  - Total: 3.05 sq mi (7.91 km^{2})
  - Land: 3.03 sq mi (7.86 km^{2})
  - Water: 0.019 sq mi (0.05 km^{2})
- Elevation: 768 ft (234 m)

Population (2020)
  - Total: 728
  - Density: 239.9/sq mi (92.62/km^{2})
- Time zone: UTC-6 (Central (CST))
  - Summer (DST): UTC-5 (CDT)
- ZIP code: 73447
- Area code: 580
- FIPS code: 40-46300
- GNIS feature ID: 2412945

Mannsville is a town in Johnston County, Oklahoma, United States. The population was 728 as of the 2020 Census. The locale is old enough to appear on a 1911 Rand McNally map of the county.

== Geography ==
Mannsville is located in southwestern Johnston County. It is bordered to the west by the town of Dickson in Carter County. As of 2010, the town had a total area of 3.3 square miles (8.5 km^{2}), more than triple its area in 2000. 0.02 square miles (0.06 km^{2}), or 0.73% of the town's area, are water bodies.

U.S. Route 177 passes through the center of Mannsville, leading west 6 miles (10 km) to the center of Dickson and southeast 10 miles (16 km) to Madill. Ardmore is 16 miles (26 km) west of Mannsville via Routes 177 and 199.

Mannsville has an all-volunteer fire department, with one fire station located in town.

== Demographics ==
Historical population
Census	Pop.	Note	%±
1900	198		—
1910	515		160.1%
1920	639		24.1%
1930	372		−41.8%
1940	359		−3.5%
1950	311		−13.4%
1960	297		−4.5%
1970	364		22.6%
1980	568		56.0%
1990	396		−30.3%
2000	587		48.2%
2010	863		47.0%
2020	728		−15.6%
U.S. Decennial Census

=== 2020 census ===
As of the 2020 census, Mannsville had a population of 728. The median age was 38.4 years. 27.2% of residents were under the age of 18 and 18.7% of residents were 65 years of age or older. For every 100 females there were 102.8 males, and for every 100 females age 18 and over there were 100.8 males age 18 and over.

0.0% of residents lived in urban areas, while 100.0% lived in rural areas.

There were 262 households in Mannsville, of which 39.7% had children under the age of 18 living in them. Of all households, 46.9% were married-couple households, 22.1% were households with a male householder and no spouse or partner present, and 22.5% were households with a female householder and no spouse or partner present. About 23.7% of all households were made up of individuals and 10.3% had someone living alone who was 65 years of age or older.

There were 298 housing units, of which 12.1% were vacant. The homeowner vacancy rate was 1.6% and the rental vacancy rate was 6.0%.

Racial composition as of the 2020 census
Race	Number	Percent
White	522	71.7%
Black or African American	2	0.3%
American Indian and Alaska Native	65	8.9%
Asian	0	0.0%
Native Hawaiian and Other Pacific Islander	0	0.0%
Some other race	66	9.1%
Two or more races	73	10.0%
Hispanic or Latino (of any race)	57	7.8%

=== 2000 census ===
As of the census of 2000, there were 587 people, 221 households, and 150 families residing in the town. The population density was 543.8 inhabitants per square mile (210.0/km^{2}). There were 253 housing units at an average density of 234.4 per square mile (90.5/km^{2}). The racial makeup of the town was 81.77% White, 0.17% African American, 9.88% Native American, 0.34% from other races, and 7.84% from two or more races. Hispanic or Latino of any race were 0.51% of the population.

There were 221 households, out of which 33.0% had children under the age of 18 living with them, 51.1% were married couples living together, 13.1% had a female householder with no husband present, and 31.7% were non-families. 25.3% of all households were made up of individuals, and 10.0% had someone living alone who was 65 years of age or older. The average household size was 2.66 and the average family size was 3.25.

In the town, the population was spread out, with 26.6% under the age of 18, 8.3% from 18 to 24, 31.2% from 25 to 44, 21.6% from 45 to 64, and 12.3% who were 65 years of age or older. The median age was 36 years. For every 100 females, there were 100.3 males. For every 100 females age 18 and over, there were 95.0 males.

The median income for a household in the town was $24,896, and the median income for a family was $30,982. Males had a median income of $21,838 versus $18,676 for females. The per capita income for the town was $10,683. About 16.0% of families and 20.1% of the population were below the poverty line, including 24.9% of those under age 18 and 17.3% of those age 65 or over.
