= Lake Texoma =

Man-made lake on Red river in Texas, US

- A view of the lake from Eisenhower State Park in Texas.

- Location within Oklahoma Location within Texas Location within the United States
- Location: Oklahoma–Texas border, United States
- Coordinates: 33°49′55″N 96°34′16″W
- Lake type: reservoir, saline
- Primary inflows: Red River, Washita River
- Primary outflows: Red River
- Catchment area: 39,719 sq mi (102,870 km^{2})
- Basin countries: United States
- Surface area: 89,000 acres (139 sq mi)
- Water volume: 2,525,568 acre⋅ft (3.115242 km^{3})
- Surface elevation: 615 to 619 ft (187 to 189 m)
- Settlements: Denison, Sherman, Gainesville (Texas);, Kingston, (Oklahoma)

Lake Texoma is one of the largest reservoirs in the United States, the 12th-largest US Army Corps of Engineers' (USACE) lake, and the largest in USACE Tulsa District. Lake Texoma is formed by Denison Dam on the Red River in Bryan County, Oklahoma, and Grayson County, Texas, about 726 miles (1,168 km) upstream from the mouth of the river. It is located at the confluence of the Red and Washita Rivers. The project was completed in 1944. The damsite is about 5 miles (8.0 km) northwest of Denison, Texas, and 15 miles (24 km) southwest of Durant, Oklahoma. Lake Texoma is the most developed and most popular lake within the USACE Tulsa District, attracting around 6 million visitors a year. Oklahoma has more of the lake within its boundaries than Texas.

== Hydrology ==
=== Tributaries and outlet ===
Lake Texoma's two main sources are the Red River from the west and Washita River from the north. Its other notable sources include Big Mineral Creek, Little Mineral Creek, Buncombe Creek, Rock Creek, and Glasses Creek. Lake Texoma drains into the Red River at the Denison Dam.

=== Water levels ===
Normal elevation of the conservation pool varies from 615 to 619 ft (187 to 189 m) National Geodetic Vertical Datum depending on the time of year. The flood control pool extends to elevation 645 ft (197 m). The lake has crested the dam's spillway at a height of 640 ft (200 m) five times - once in 1957, 1990, and 2007, and on May 24 and June 18, 2015. (USACE 2003a) The lake's previously highest elevation was recorded on May 6, 1990, at 644.76 feet. This record was broken on May 29, 2015, and the lake crested on June 1, 2015, at a new record elevation of 645.72 feet. The top of Denison Dam is at 670 feet.

=== Saltwater from the Red River ===
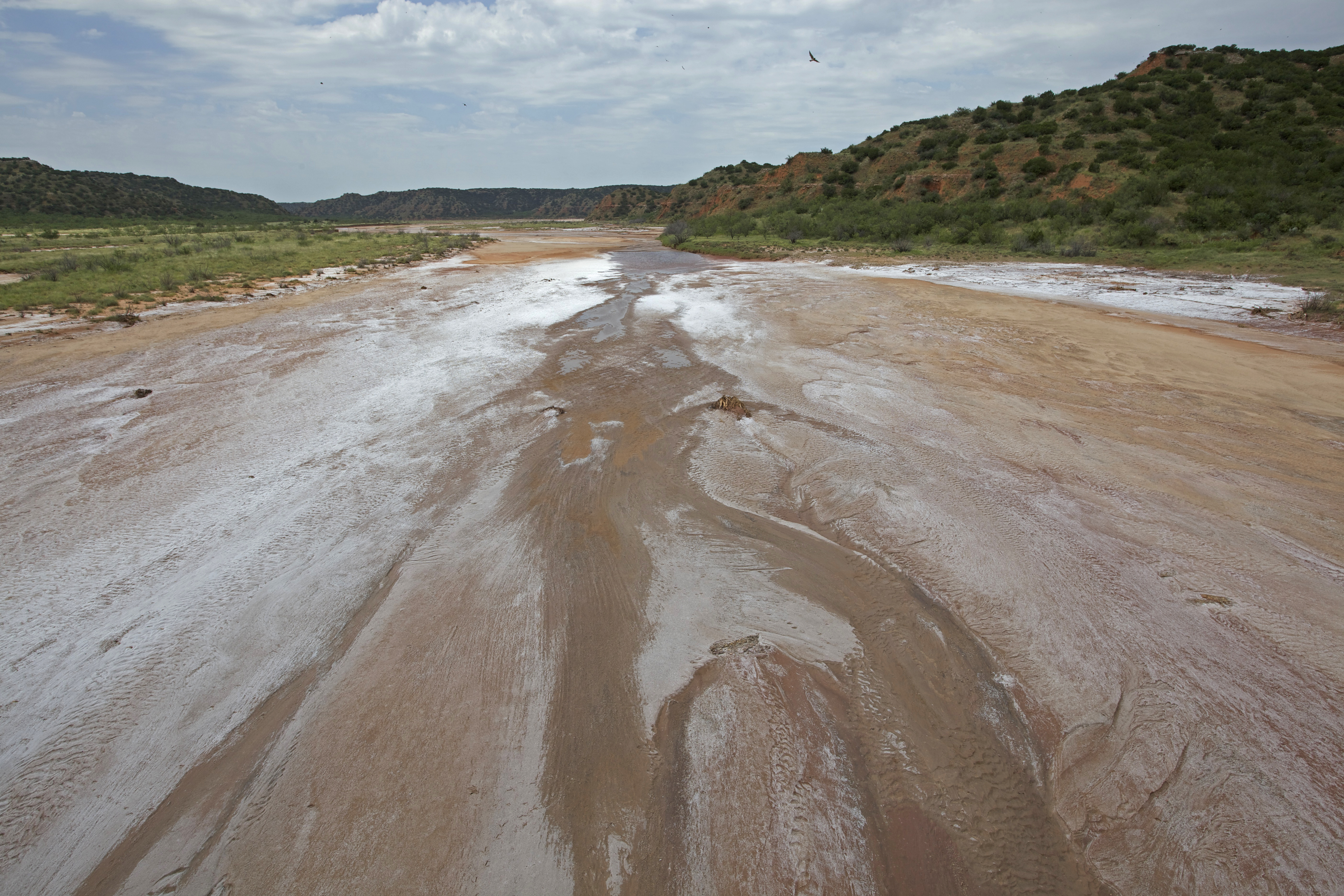
Salt beds in the Red River

The Red River that formed Lake Texoma is a saltwater river due to salt deposits left over from a 250-million-year-old former sea that was in the current Texas-Oklahoma border region. As time passed, that sea evaporated, leaving salts deposits — mostly sodium chloride. Rock and silt eventually buried the deposits, but the salts continue to leach through natural seeps in tributaries above Lake Texoma, sending as much as 3,450 tons of salt per day flowing down the Red River. The problem with the water in the Red River is much of it is too salty and requires costly treatment, if it is usable at all. Due to this phenomenon, striped bass, a saltwater fish species, thrives in Lake Texoma. Lake Texoma is home to the only self-sustaining population of striped bass in Texas.

== Geography ==
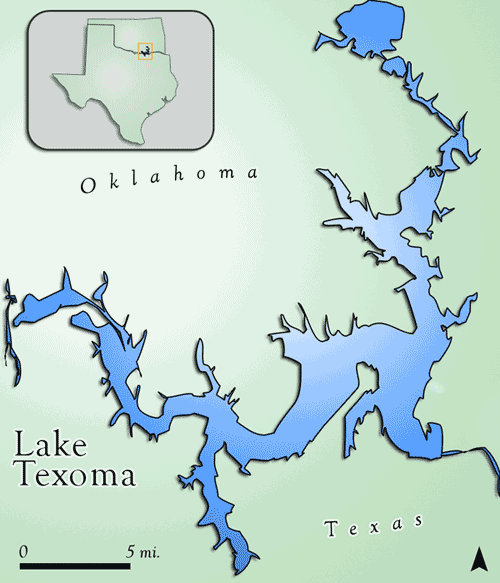
Map of Lake Texoma

Lake Texoma is situated on the border between Oklahoma and Texas in the Oklahoma counties of Bryan, Marshall, Johnston, and Love, and the Texas counties of Grayson and Cooke. It has a surface area of 89,000 acres (139 sq mi), a conservation water volume of 2,525,568 acre⋅ft (3.115242 km^{3}), and a flood-control volume of 5,194,163 acre⋅ft (6.406906 km^{3}).

=== Cities ===
Notable cities surrounding the lake in Texas are Denison, Sherman, and Gainesville. In Oklahoma, the most notable city is Durant.

Other towns and cities near the lake in Bryan County, Oklahoma, include Cartwright, Colbert, Calera, Platter, and Mead. In Marshall County, Oklahoma, Madill and Kingston are the nearest cities, with many smaller communities near the lake including Enos, Little City, Cumberland, Kingston, New Woodville, McBride, Willis, and the unsubmerged portion of Aylesworth. Finchtown, Oklahoma was entirely submerged. Most of Aylesworth was submerged under the water of the lake. Other towns and cities in Texas include Gordonville, Locust, Fink, Pottsboro, and Preston.

=== Islands ===
Several small islands on Lake Texoma are accessible only by means of water transportation. Some of the island names include, in order from west to east, West Island, Wood Island, Hog Island, Treasure Island, Little Island, and North Island.

=== Parks ===
Lake Texoma features two state parks, being Lake Texoma State Park in Oklahoma and Eisenhower State Park in Texas. It also has 54 United States Army Corps of Engineers (USACE) managed parks. The northern and southern reaches of the lake each terminate within a National Wildlife Refuge.

== History ==
Lake Texoma has grown in importance over the decades from primarily relief from annual flooding and destruction to an employment engine for the area, and finally a recreation mecca for the nation.

George Moulton who some consider the father of the Denison Dam was a Denison businessman who dreamed of placing a dam on the Red River at Baer's Ferry as early as 1925. He began lobbying and talking to Chambers of Commerce in Denison and Durant in the late 1920s. Sam Rayburn in the early 1930s was instrumental in the legislative process of making the dam and lake a reality.

The Flood Control Act of 1938 authorized funding for the Denison dam, and the U.S. Army Corps of Engineers set up the Denison District Office in June of that year. The first Commander was Captain Lucius D. Clay.

Lake Texoma was constructed during WWII. German prisoners of war were involved in the construction of the dam and were the first POWs to be used in a labor camp. These prisoners were from Rommel's Afrika Korps and were housed in camps at Tishomingo and Powell, Oklahoma. Later, the Tishomingo POWs were housed in another camp at the spillway. Only non-war related work could be performed by POWs according to the Geneva Convention – such as clearing trees for the proposed lake and light construction. Construction projects performed by the prisoners included mortared stone lining of the drainage ditches around the damsite, which are still present today.

Construction of the dam was completed in January 1944 at a cost of $54 million ($881 million in 2022 dollars). The installation of the two generators was completed in September 1949. Initially Lake Texoma was authorized for flood control, hydropower and water supply. Recreation was not officially added as a project purpose by Congress until 1988.

The management of the lands around Lake Texoma was turned over to the National Park Service (NPS) in 1946 and they continued until 1949 when both agencies decided that the NPS would move out and the U.S. Army Corps of Engineers would take over the operations and maintenance responsibilities. The National Park Service was always a reluctant partner in this arrangement and finally removed themselves from Texoma in 1949.

The lake attracted worldwide media attention in June 2015 when water was drained following a flood, causing a vortex with 2.5-m-wide hole to form.

In 2024, the border between Texas and Oklahoma was adjusted so that a North Texas Municipal Water District pump station on the lake was no longer bisected by the border.

== Popularity ==
Lake Texoma's popularity is largely attributed to its sheer size and proximity to the Dallas–Fort Worth metroplex. The lake is about an hour's drive north from the metropolitan area. The Lake Texoma area, known simply as Texoma or Texomaland, is experiencing rapid economic growth due to heavy tourist use.

== Recreation ==
Diverse recreational opportunities include two wildlife refuges, two state parks, 54 USACE-managed parks, 12 marinas, 26 resorts, hundreds of campgrounds, and a variety of golf courses. Power boating, sailing, personal watercraft, water skiing, and wind surfing are all popular. The lake has become a major sailing center based on its size, depth, and miles of sailing shoreline.

During the spring break and Fourth of July holidays, many college students home for the holidays gather in an area called Fobb Bottom on the Oklahoma side.

Lake Texoma is also home to the Lakefest Regatta, widely considered to be the first inland charity regatta in the United States. The event typically attracts up to 100 keelboats and more than 500 sailors each spring. Since its inception, Lakefest has raised more than $2 million in support of various children's charities in North Texas. The current beneficiary is the Make-A-Wish Foundation of North Texas.

Former professional funny car race driver "Flash" Gordon Mineo organized many poker run events on Lake Texoma. Gordon and his wife, Ann Mineo, along with three others, died September 2, 2006, in a boating accident on Lake Texoma.

=== Fishing ===
In 2004, a blue catfish was pulled from the lake that weighed 121.5 pounds (55.1 kg), temporarily setting a world weight record for rod-and-reel-caught catfish. The fish was moved to a freshwater aquarium in Athens, Texas. More commonly, catfish in Lake Texoma weigh between 5 and 70 lb (2.3 and 31.8 kg).

=== Camping ===
Many campgrounds, both public and private, exist along the shores of Lake Texoma. Among these are Eisenhower State Park, named for President Dwight Eisenhower, who was born in nearby Denison; Camp All Saints owned by the Episcopal Diocese of Dallas; and James Ray Scout Reservation, owned by the Circle Ten Council of the Boy Scouts of America.

== Fees ==
Because of a need to pay for maintenance and improvements, the State of Oklahoma has imposed a use fee on some Lake Texoma State Park visitors effective June 15, 2020.

== Private development initiatives ==
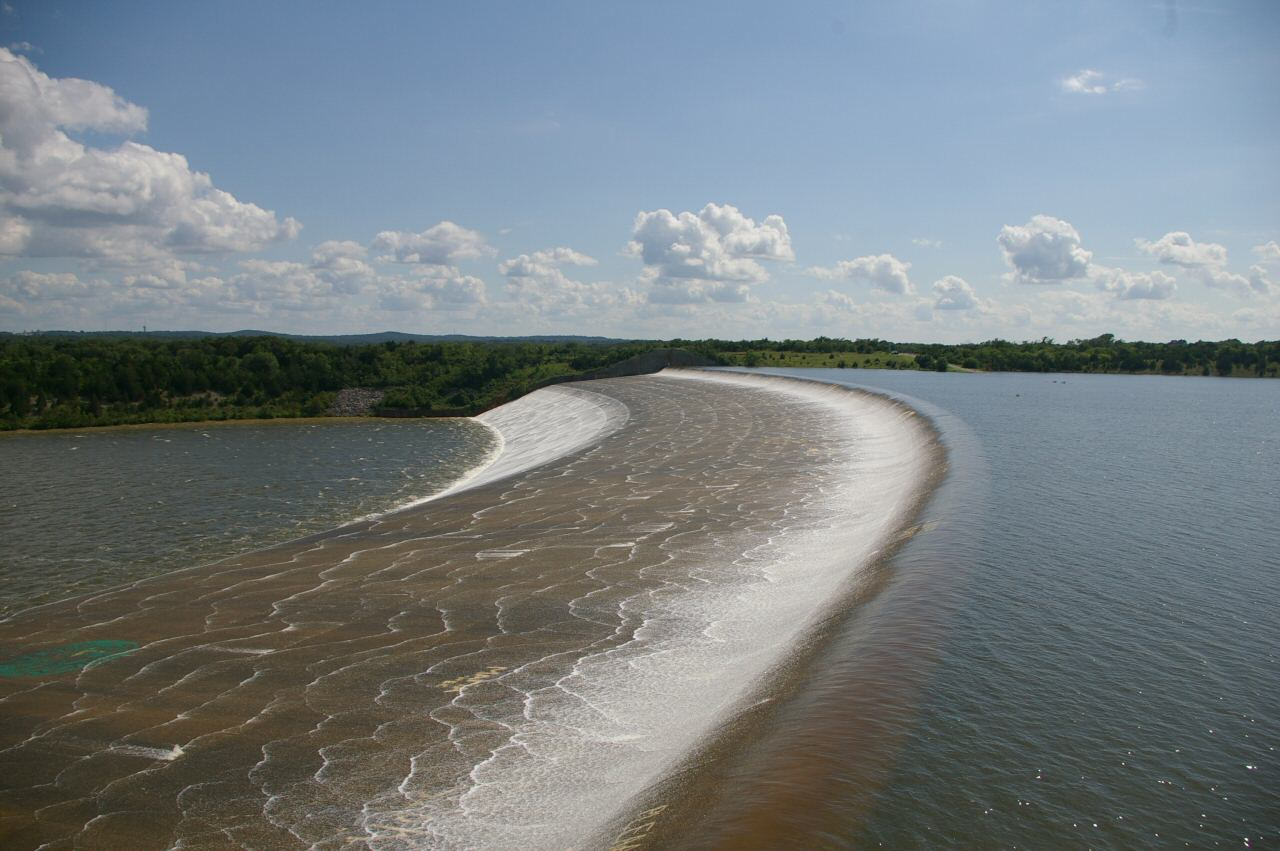
Water going over emergency spillway for the third time in the dam's history, July 2007

Recently, several large transfers of public land to private developers have been authorized by the federal government.

The Water Resources Development Act of 1999 (Public Law 106-53 113 Stat. 359), authorized USACE to sell to the state of Oklahoma about 1,580 acres (6.4 km^{2}) of federally owned land on the north shore of Lake Texoma in Marshall County, Oklahoma, under lease at that time to the Oklahoma Tourism and Recreation Department. The land was part of the Lake Texoma State Park, a conglomerate of state-owned and federally owned lands leased to the state, totaling around 1,882 acres (7.62 km^{2}). The park was home to numerous state- and concession-operated facilities and activities, including a resort lodge with 106 guest rooms and suites.

Initially, the State of Oklahoma Commissioners of the Land Office purchased only 558 acres (2.26 km^{2}) from USACE in March 2007. Soon after, the state reached an agreement with Pointe Vista Development, LLC, for the sale of roughly 750 acres (to include the land purchased from USACE and land already owned by the state) for the development of home sites and an upscale resort. Pointe Vista is a partnership between Mark Fischer, president and chief executive of Chaparral Energy, and Aubrey McClendon, chairman and chief executive of Chesapeake Energy. Also in 2007, the Governor of Oklahoma, Brad Henry, indicated that the state would likely purchase all or most of the remaining land at Texoma State Park under lease from USACE to transfer to Pointe Vista for further development. The new development is proposed to include 18–36 holes of championship golf, a club house and practice facility, aquatic center, outdoor recreation center, nature parks, campgrounds, retail shops, and an amphitheater. The new development will cost an estimated $360 million, which will also include housing, as well as a full-service hotel with restaurants, gym, business center, multiple swimming pools, spa, and meeting rooms. The proposed private community will have 250–350 high-end homes, ranging in size from 1,500 to 4,000 square feet (140 to 370 m^{2}).

The Lake Texoma Lodge, built in 1951, officially closed its doors on December 1, 2006. The lodge was in poor repair, resulting in a steady decline in the facility's use. The lodge has since been demolished.

Section 3182(j) of the Water Resources Development Act of 2007, authorized USACE to convey approximately 900 acres (3.6 km^{2}) of land at Lake Texoma to the city of Denison, Texas. The provision was backed by U.S. Congressman Ralph Hall (R) as an economic development initiative. The sale is to be at fair market value and the city of Denison is responsible for all costs associated with the transaction (costs for completing NEPA compliance documentation, surveys, appraisals, USACE administrative costs, etc.). The city in turn intends to sell the property to George Schuler, a local developer, for the creation of a private residential and recreational development on the conveyed land and adjacent land already owned by Schuler. The eventual development may result in as many as 10,000 residents locating in the Grandpappy Point area.

The city and Schuler attempted to lease the same land from the Corps of Engineers in 2004, but abandoned those attempts in favor of legislation mandating the transfer, due to the inability to use the land for the intended purposes under a lease without an update of the Corps Shoreline Management Plan (SMP) for Lake Texoma. The majority of the land is currently zoned as Limited Development, Protected Area (suitable for nature hiking, birdwatching, etc.) and Aesthetic or Scenic areas. The Corps has previously stated that any revision of the SMP will require the completion of a Supplemental Environmental Impact Statement (SEIS) for the entire Lake Texoma project that will consider the cumulative impacts of the extensive development that has occurred around the Lake since the original EIS was conducted in the 1970s. Completion of a lake-wde SEIS has been estimated by the Corps to take up to 2 years to complete at a cost of approximately $2.5 million. Since Section 3182(j) contained no provisions exempting the sale from the requirements of NEPA, it is expected that completion of the SEIS and revision of the SMP will also be required prior to completion of the sale, and that the city of Denison will be required to bear that as a cost associated with the transaction. Ultimately, 600 acres (2.4 km^{2}) were transferred in 2013.
