= Pickens County, Chickasaw Nation =

Political subdivision of Chickasaw Nation

Coordinates: 34.360°N 97.627°W

Pickens County was a political subdivision of the Chickasaw Nation in the Indian Territory from 1855, prior to Oklahoma being admitted as a state in 1907. The county was one of four that comprised the Chickasaw Nation. Following statehood, its territory was divided among several Oklahoma counties that have continued to the present.

Map of Pickens County, Chickasaw Nation (1850-1907).

== History ==
The Chickasaw Indians, after being removed from the southeastern United States to Indian Territory in the 1830s, were assigned to live within the boundaries of the Choctaw Nation. In 1855 the Chickasaw Nation was established as a separate entity. The boundaries and political subdivisions of the Chickasaw Nation may be traced to Choctaw laws and legislation.

Until the Chickasaws’ separation from the Choctaw Nation in 1855, the Choctaws divided their territory into four major administrative and judicial regions, or districts. Although the Chickasaw were free to live anywhere within the Choctaw Nation they chose, most were concentrated in its western region, known as the Chickasaw District.

In 1850 the Choctaw Nation approved a constitutional change that enabled each of its four constituent districts to be divided into counties. The Chickasaw District was divided into Panola County in the southeast, Wichita County in the southwest, Caddo County in the northwest, and Perry County in the northeast. The precise date of Wichita County's creation is unclear, but it had assumed its name and functions by at least November 1851, according to judicial proceedings published by the Bryan County Heritage Association in 1977. In 1854, the General Council of the Choctaw Nation changed the name of Wichita County to Pickens County.

Pickens County was named for Edmund Pickens (Chickasaw), also known as Okchantubby, a leader who helped negotiate the 1854 agreement by which the Chickasaw separated from the Choctaw and established their own nation and territory. He also was integral to making the treaty of alliance with the Confederate States of America in 1861. Pickens was elected on Nov. 4, 1848 as the prospective Governor of the Chickasaw Nation during an early attempt to secede from the Choctaw Nation.

Oakland, a community two miles northwest of Madill, was designated as the Pickens County seat.

A constitution promulgated on Aug. 30, 1856 established the new Chickasaw government and its counties of Panola, Pickens, Pontotoc and Tishomingo. A Chickasaw Senate law on Oct. 5, 1859 set their boundaries definitively.

The county government served mostly for judicial purposes. Voters elected the county judge and sheriff, who served two-year terms. Constables, or deputies, assisted the sheriff in keeping public order. They were particularly needed in Pickens County, which covered a much larger geographic area than most counties.

A federal law designed to prepare the Five Civilized Tribes for eventual statehood, known as the Curtis Act, stripped the Chickasaw and other governments of meaningful powers after 1906. During the period following the Act's passage in 1898, the Chickasaw government became, according to one historian, an “empty shell.” Although the Chickasaw constitution and laws were still in effect, all significant powers were transferred to the federal government.

== Geography ==
Pickens County lay in the southwestern part of the Chickasaw Nation between the Washita and Red rivers. The Washita River formed its eastern/northern boundaries, and its western boundary was the western edge of the Chickasaw Nation, also known as the 98th Meridian. Pickens County was unusually large and sprawling. It included the present-day cities of Ardmore, Duncan, Madill, Marietta, and Sulphur, extending almost as far as Chickasha.

Rush Creek, Wild Horse Creek, and Caddo Creek were the largest streams traversing the county.

The county was defined by the Arbuckle Mountains, which formed a considerable barrier to movement and commerce in the center of the county.

Pickens County's location on the western edge of the domains of the Five Civilized Tribes left it exposed in its early years to external threats. Depredations and threats from the Kiowa, Comanche and Apache Indians, whose reservations lay to the west, caused the U.S. Army to bolster frontier defenses. A site on the Washita River was chosen in 1850 as the location of Fort Arbuckle. After the construction of Fort Sill to the west in 1869, Fort Arbuckle ceased to be strategically significant and was abandoned by the Army in 1870.

Despite its sprawl and size, a well-designed transportation network was never developed in the county, and trails linked the settlements. A stagecoach route ran east–west through the county, linking Fort Arbuckle with Fort Sill. Its western site was Rush Springs Stage Station. The Chisholm Trail ran through the western part of Pickens County, passing through the settlements of Fleetwood, Duncan Store (now Duncan), and Parr (southeast of present-day Rush Springs). It was first used by Indian hunting and raiding parties. After 1867, cattlemen driving livestock north adopted it, with their herds widening the trail. One railroad traversed the county: the Gulf, Colorado and Santa Fe Railroad, which passed north-to-south through Ardmore and Marietta.

A singular point of geographic significance was established in Pickens County in 1870. United States General Land Office surveyors established Initial Point, or "point of beginning," at 34° 30' 24" N latitude and 97° 14' 49" W longitude. From this point all land in Indian Territory and Oklahoma Territory, and later the State of Oklahoma except for its Panhandle, would be surveyed and described. The site was west of Davis, Indian Territory (now Davis, Oklahoma). It is considered one of the notable initial points in the United States.

== Statehood ==
As Oklahoma's statehood approached, its leading citizens, who were gathered for the Oklahoma Constitutional Convention, realized in laying out the future state's counties that the Chickasaw Nation's counties were not designed to support the requirements of a modern state. Three of the four counties were unusually large and geographically sprawling, possibly due to the relatively sparse population living there. Pontotoc County, as example, spanned the countryside in a northwestern-to-southeastern arc from north of Chickasha to west of Wapanucka. Pickens County posed similar challenges, stretching from the Chickasha area in the northwest to Madill in the southeast. Following statehood the influx of settlers from the United States allowed for the region to be broken into smaller counties. But first the historic Chickasaw counties had to be disestablished.

This conundrum was recognized by the framers of the proposed State of Sequoyah, who met in 1905 to propose statehood for Indian Territory. The Sequoyah Constitutional Convention also proposed a county structure that abolished the Chickasaw counties. Pickens County was divided principally into the proposed counties of Bonaparte, Byrd, Curtis, Garvin, Gilbert, Guy, Harris, Jefferson, McLish, Overton, and Washington.

Much of this proposition was borrowed two years later by Oklahoma's framers, who adopted certain of these concepts for the future counties of Carter, Garvin, Grady, Jefferson, Love, Marshall, Murray, and Stephens counties. Pickens County ceased to exist upon Oklahoma's statehood on November 16, 1907.
