= Oakland, Oklahoma =

- Town
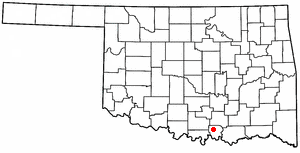
- Location of Oakland, Oklahoma
- Coordinates: 34°05′46″N 96°47′58″W
- Country: United States
- State: Oklahoma
- County: Marshall

Area
  - Total: 1.43 sq mi (3.70 km^{2})
  - Land: 1.43 sq mi (3.70 km^{2})
  - Water: 0 sq mi (0.00 km^{2})
- Elevation: 873 ft (266 m)

Population (2020)
  - Total: 831
  - Density: 581/sq mi (224.4/km^{2})
- Time zone: UTC-6 (Central (CST))
  - Summer (DST): UTC-5 (CDT)
- ZIP code: 73446
- Area code: 580
- FIPS code: 40-53400
- GNIS feature ID: 2413068

Oakland is a town in Marshall County, Oklahoma, United States. It is located just northwest of Madill, Oklahoma off US Route 70. The population was 831 as of the 2020 Census,

== History ==
Oakland was county seat of Pickens County, Chickasaw Nation. As county seat, it hosted the county courthouse. Although never a sizable population center, the community was busy during sessions of county court, particularly since Pickens County sprawled from Chickasha in the far northwest to Madill in the southeast.

== Geography ==
Oakland is located at 34°5′58″N 96°47′36″W (34.099509, -96.793409).

According to the United States Census Bureau, the town has a total area of 0.6 square miles (1.6 km^{2}), all land.

== Demographics ==
Historical population
Census	Pop.	Note	%±
1900	701		—
1910	366		−47.8%
1920	420		14.8%
1930	248		−41.0%
1940	311		25.4%
1950	293		−5.8%
1960	288		−1.7%
1970	317		10.1%
1980	485		53.0%
1990	602		24.1%
2000	674		12.0%
2010	1,057		56.8%
2020	831		−21.4%
U.S. Decennial Census

=== 2020 census ===
As of the 2020 census, Oakland had a population of 831. The median age was 32.2 years. 31.8% of residents were under the age of 18 and 10.6% of residents were 65 years of age or older. For every 100 females there were 97.9 males, and for every 100 females age 18 and over there were 89.6 males age 18 and over.

0.0% of residents lived in urban areas, while 100.0% lived in rural areas.

There were 299 households in Oakland, of which 42.5% had children under the age of 18 living in them. Of all households, 43.1% were married-couple households, 20.1% were households with a male householder and no spouse or partner present, and 30.1% were households with a female householder and no spouse or partner present. About 25.4% of all households were made up of individuals and 6.0% had someone living alone who was 65 years of age or older.

There were 328 housing units, of which 8.8% were vacant. The homeowner vacancy rate was 1.0% and the rental vacancy rate was 7.6%.

Racial composition as of the 2020 census
Race	Number	Percent
White	351	42.2%
Black or African American	8	1.0%
American Indian and Alaska Native	71	8.5%
Asian	1	0.1%
Native Hawaiian and Other Pacific Islander	0	0.0%
Some other race	304	36.6%
Two or more races	96	11.6%
Hispanic or Latino (of any race)	397	47.8%

=== 2000 census ===
As of the 2000 census, there were 674 people, 251 households, and 174 families residing in the town. The population density was 1,206.6 inhabitants per square mile (465.9/km^{2}). There were 278 housing units at an average density of 497.7 per square mile (192.2/km^{2}). The racial makeup of the town was 65.43% White, 3.71% African American, 12.76% Native American, 0.30% Asian, 14.84% from other races, and 2.97% from two or more races. Hispanic or Latino of any race were 18.69% of the population.

There were 251 households, out of which 38.2% had children under the age of 18 living with them, 51.4% were married couples living together, 13.1% had a female householder with no husband present, and 30.3% were non-families. 27.5% of all households were made up of individuals, and 13.1% had someone living alone who was 65 years of age or older. The average household size was 2.69 and the average family size was 3.27.

In the town, the population was spread out, with 30.3% under the age of 18, 8.6% from 18 to 24, 31.9% from 25 to 44, 18.2% from 45 to 64, and 11.0% who were 65 years of age or older. The median age was 31 years. For every 100 females, there were 87.2 males. For every 100 females age 18 and over, there were 82.9 males.

The median income for a household in the town was $22,422, and the median income for a family was $28,875. Males had a median income of $23,625 versus $14,375 for females. The per capita income for the town was $11,420. About 21.3% of families and 26.8% of the population were below the poverty line, including 35.1% of those under age 18 and 27.5% of those age 65 or over.
