= Kingston, Oklahoma =

- Town
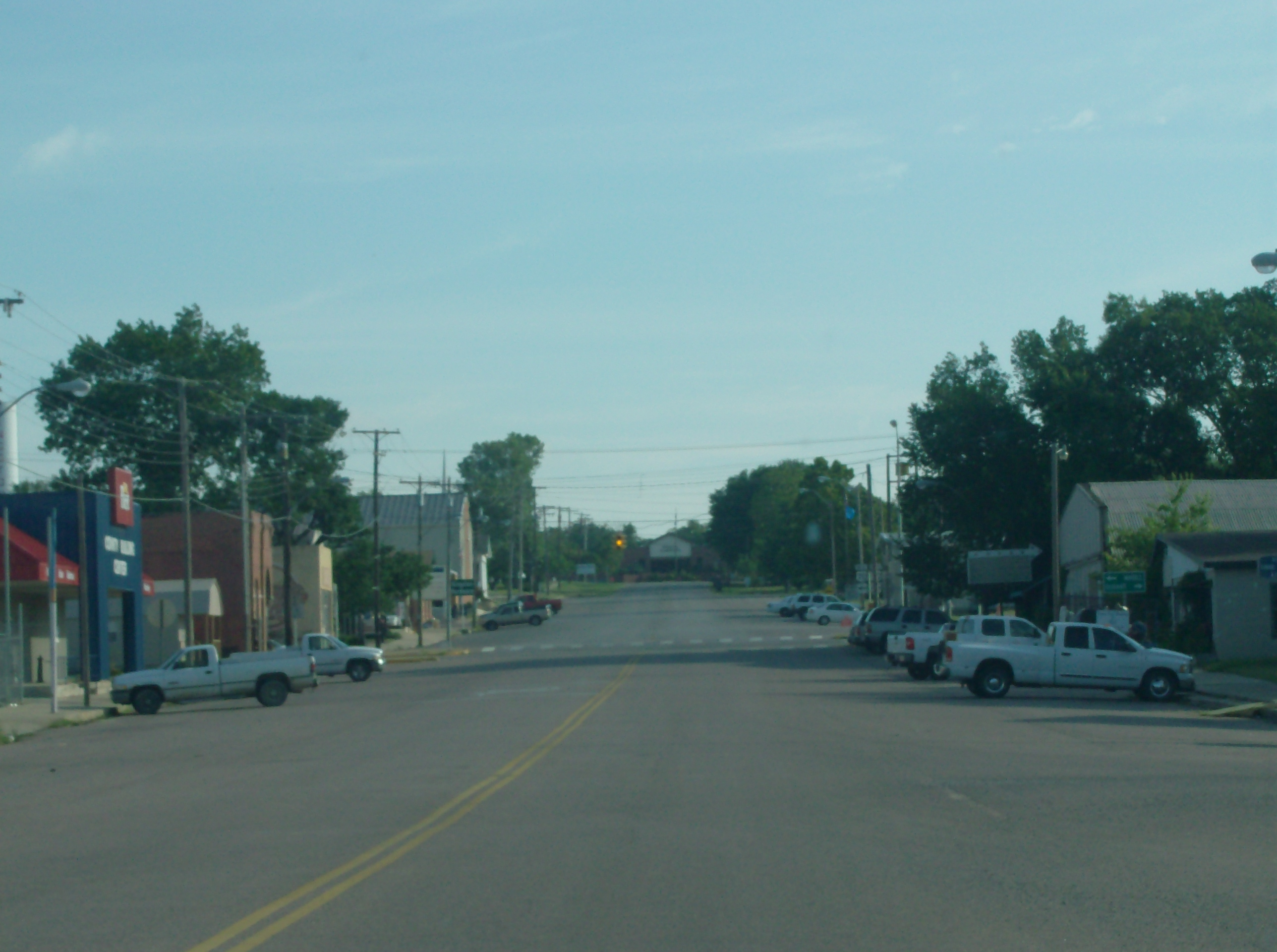
- Main Street

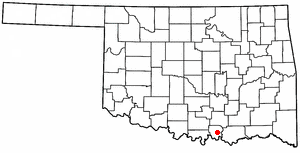
- Location of Kingston, Oklahoma
- Coordinates: 34°0′1″N 96°42′23″W
- Country: United States
- State: Oklahoma
- County: Marshall

Area
  - Total: 2.19 sq mi (5.68 km^{2})
  - Land: 2.19 sq mi (5.68 km^{2})
  - Water: 0 sq mi (0.00 km^{2})
- Elevation: 791 ft (241 m)

Population (2020)
  - Total: 1,431
  - Density: 652.4/sq mi (251.88/km^{2})
- Time zone: UTC-6 (Central (CST))
  - Summer (DST): UTC-5 (CDT)
- ZIP code: 73439
- Area code: 580
- Notable figures: FIPS code: 40-39900
- GNIS feature ID: 2412835
- Website: www.townofkingston.com

Kingston is a town in Marshall County, Oklahoma, United States, in the central southern portion of the state close to the border. The population was 1,431 as of the 2020 Census,

== Geography ==
Kingston is served by US Route 70, as well as State highways 70A, 70B, and 32.

According to the United States Census Bureau, the town has a total area of 1.8 square miles (4.7 km^{2}), all land.

== Demographics ==
Historical population
Census	Pop.	Note	%±
1910	439		—
1920	767		74.7%
1930	552		−28.0%
1940	481		−12.9%
1950	677		40.7%
1960	639		−5.6%
1970	710		11.1%
1980	1,171		64.9%
1990	1,237		5.6%
2000	1,390		12.4%
2010	1,601		15.2%
2020	1,431		−10.6%
U.S. Decennial Census

=== 2020 census ===
As of the 2020 census, Kingston had a population of 1,431. The median age was 39.4 years. 26.3% of residents were under the age of 18 and 19.1% of residents were 65 years of age or older. For every 100 females there were 91.1 males, and for every 100 females age 18 and over there were 84.3 males age 18 and over.

0.0% of residents lived in urban areas, while 100.0% lived in rural areas.

There were 570 households in Kingston, of which 34.9% had children under the age of 18 living in them. Of all households, 38.2% were married-couple households, 20.2% were households with a male householder and no spouse or partner present, and 32.6% were households with a female householder and no spouse or partner present. About 26.2% of all households were made up of individuals and 12.1% had someone living alone who was 65 years of age or older.

There were 652 housing units, of which 12.6% were vacant. The homeowner vacancy rate was 2.7% and the rental vacancy rate was 7.5%.

Racial composition as of the 2020 census
Race	Number	Percent
White	1,005	70.2%
Black or African American	8	0.6%
American Indian and Alaska Native	173	12.1%
Asian	0	0.0%
Native Hawaiian and Other Pacific Islander	0	0.0%
Some other race	71	5.0%
Two or more races	174	12.2%
Hispanic or Latino (of any race)	103	7.2%

== History ==
Kingston was originally known as Helen. The community was named for Helen Willis, daughter of J.H. Willis, a prominent early-day resident. On April 4, 1894, a post office was established at Helen and was called Kingston, Indian Territory. The post office took its name from Jeff King, a longtime local resident.

At the time of its founding, Helen, later Kingston, was located in Pickens County, Chickasaw Nation, in Indian Territory. This was one of the Five Civilized Tribes required to remove to this area from the Southeast United States in the 1830s.

The early settlement included a general store, cotton gin, and a schoolhouse that doubled as a church.

Several of the older buildings in Kingston were torn down in the late 1980s for redevelopment of the area for a new hardware store and lumberyard. The town constructed a new multipurpose activity building, which is located on the high school campus. The oldest remaining building in Kingston, which originally was the town bank, has been adapted for retail use as Dee's Creative Corner.

Kingston's High School Alumni Association, founded in 1911 soon after statehood, is the oldest active alumni association in the state of Oklahoma. Each year graduates of Kingston High School are given the opportunity to join the association. Through their donations and fund raisers, the Alumni Association helps to send local students to college.

Notable figures include country music singer, Dale Lay, and rock and roll drummer Greg Upchurch. Lay released several country albums, several radio singles, and performed at the Grand Ole Opry in Nashville, Tennessee. He developed and supported the Kingston High School band. For several years, Lay raised money to buy new instruments and band uniforms at his annual benefit concert.

Dale’s son, Anthony Lay, is a nationally syndicated radio personality. He goes by the moniker “The AntMan” and hosts a syndicated Saturday night show, "Country House Party", broadcast on more than 80 iHeart Country radio stations across the nation.

Greg Upchurch began his rock career with the band Puddle of Mudd. Since 2005 he has been the drummer for 3 Doors Down. Upchurch first developed his percussion skills in the Kingston High School band.

On March 21, 2022, an EF2 tornado caused significant damage to structures.

== Kingston High School ==
After a new high school was built, the original high school building was adapted for use as an elementary school. Today, the elementary, middle, and high schools each have their own buildings.

The school reportedly had a pool, which was filled in and paved to serve as a parking lot. In 2019 a new high school with more classrooms was completed.

A.E. Findley was the band director of Kingston High School's first band. He was the first band director elected into the Oklahoma Bandmasters Association in 1966.

The high school has two blood drives each year and does a yearly food drive as part of their charity work.

Kingston High School and Madill High School have a football rivalry, known as the “Marshall County Super Bowl.” The schools alternated as hosts for the bowl games. Madill was the site of the bowl until the teams played again in fall 2020. That competition was cancelled due to the COVID-19 pandemic. Once vaccines were made available, this competition resumed in fall 2021, with Kingston being the host school once again.
