= Madill, Oklahoma =

- City
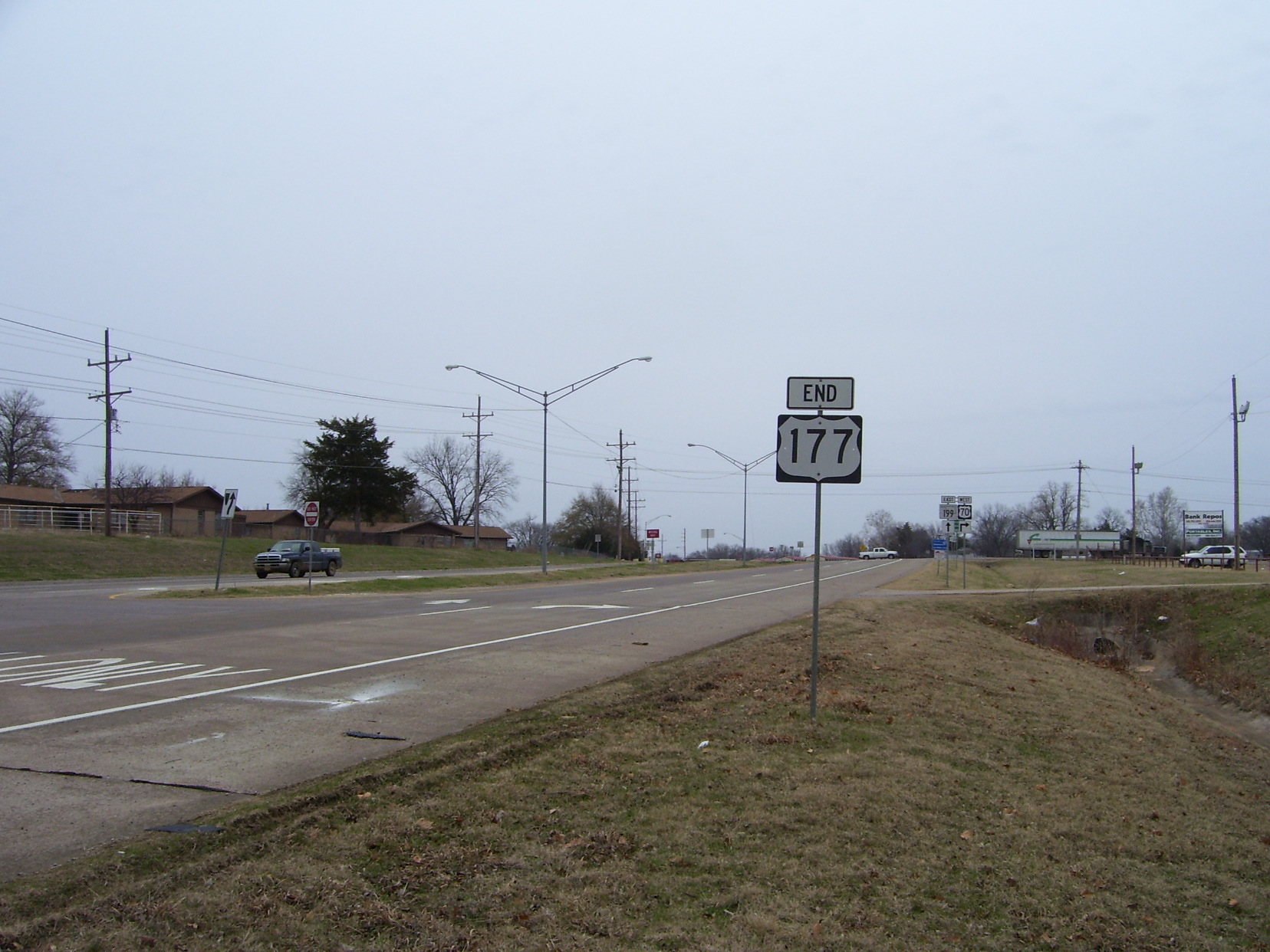
- State Highway 199, U.S. 177, and U.S. 70

- Location within Oklahoma Location within the United States
- Coordinates: 34°05′14″N 96°46′27″W
- Country: United States
- State: Oklahoma
- County: Marshall

Area
  - Total: 4.45 sq mi (11.53 km^{2})
  - Land: 4.42 sq mi (11.44 km^{2})
  - Water: 0.035 sq mi (0.09 km^{2})
- Elevation: 804 ft (245 m)

Population (2020)
  - Total: 3,914
  - Density: 886.1/sq mi (342.11/km^{2})
- Time zone: UTC-6 (Central (CST))
  - Summer (DST): UTC-5 (CDT)
- ZIP code: 73446
- Area code: 580
- FIPS code: 40-45750
- GNIS feature ID: 2410907
- Website: cityofmadill.com

Madill is a city in and the county seat of Marshall County, Oklahoma, United States. It was named in honor of George Alexander Madill, an attorney for the St. Louis-San Francisco Railway. The population was 3,914 as of the 2020 Census, up 3.8% from the figure reported in the 2010 census of 3,770, which itself was an increase of 10.8 percent from the 3,410 reported at the 2000 census. It is best known as the site of the annual National Sand Bass Festival. It is part of the Texoma region.

== History ==
Madill was founded in 1900 by William N. Taliaferro, who had settled in 1886, in what was then known as Pickens County, Chickasaw Nation, in the Indian Territory. Taliaferro owned a 600 acres (240 ha) farm and operated some ranches in the nearby town of Oakland, 2 miles (3.2 km) northwest of Madill. Oakland had been the area's largest town, but the St. Louis, San Francisco and New Orleans Railroad building through the town caused Madill to grow and Oakland, two miles northwest, to decline. A post office was established at Madill on April 29, 1901, The city was chartered on September 12, 1902. The first public school opened in a four-room frame structure built on the south side of the town in 1903.

Farming and ranching became the town's principal industries early in its history because the surrounding area was highly fertile and the railroad provided good transportation to markets. There were also mineral springs nearby, and an oil seep north of town. The Arbuckle oilfield was discovered in 1904, and experienced another boom in 1924. Pure Oil Company brought in a well east of town in 1939 and built a company town called Pure Camp to house the oilfield workers. Pure Camp was destroyed by a tornado and killed two people on April 2, 1957. The camp closed permanently in July, 1959. Madill was struck by another EF-2 tornado during the Tornado outbreak of April 22–23, 2020.

== Geography ==
According to the United States Census Bureau, the city has a total area of 2.9 square miles (7.5 km^{2}), of which 2.9 square miles (7.5 km^{2}) is land and 0.04 square miles (0.10 km^{2}) (1.37%) is water.

Madill is about 10 miles (16 km) north of Lake Texoma. It was originally named Kenlock.

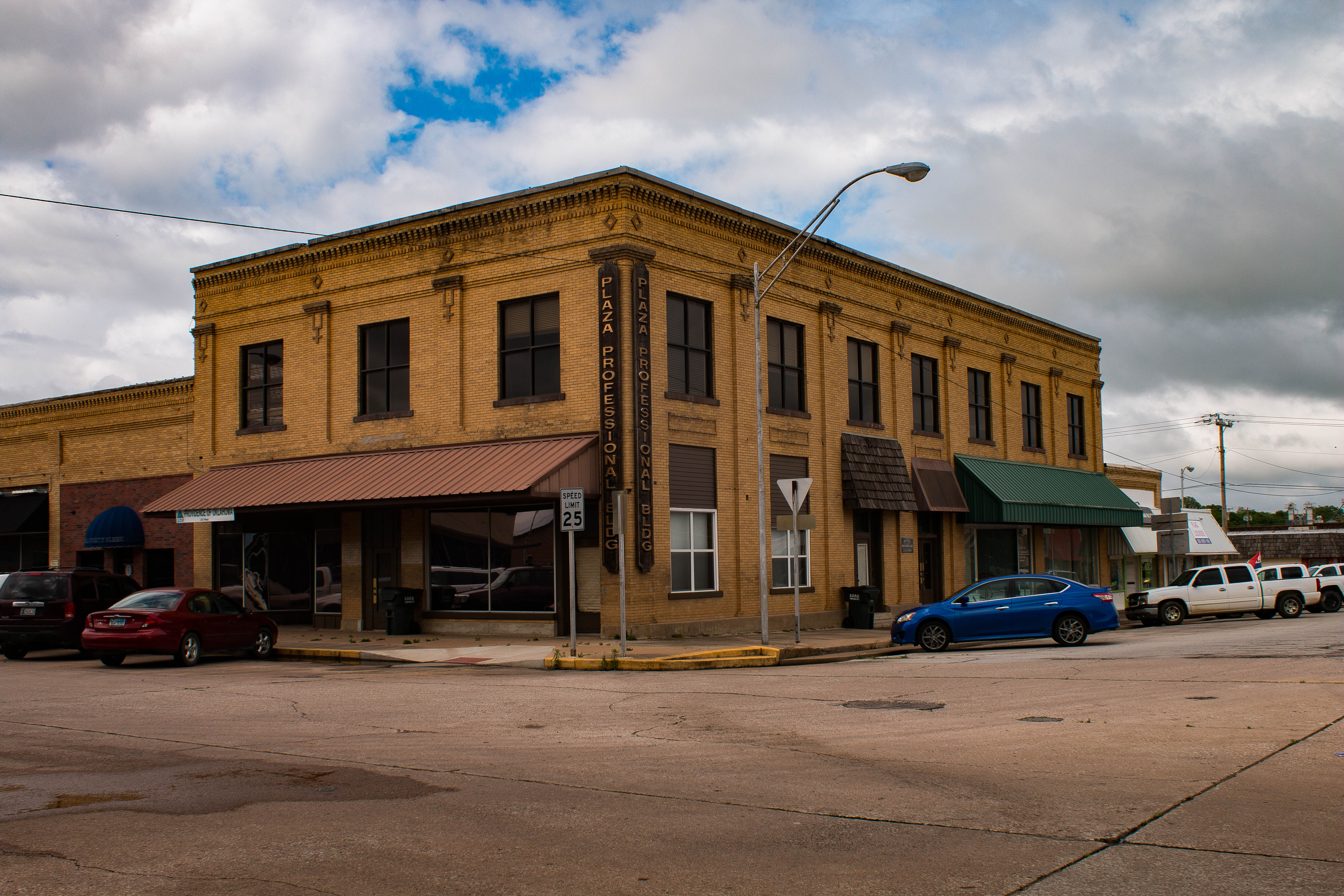
Worth Hotel Building (2016)

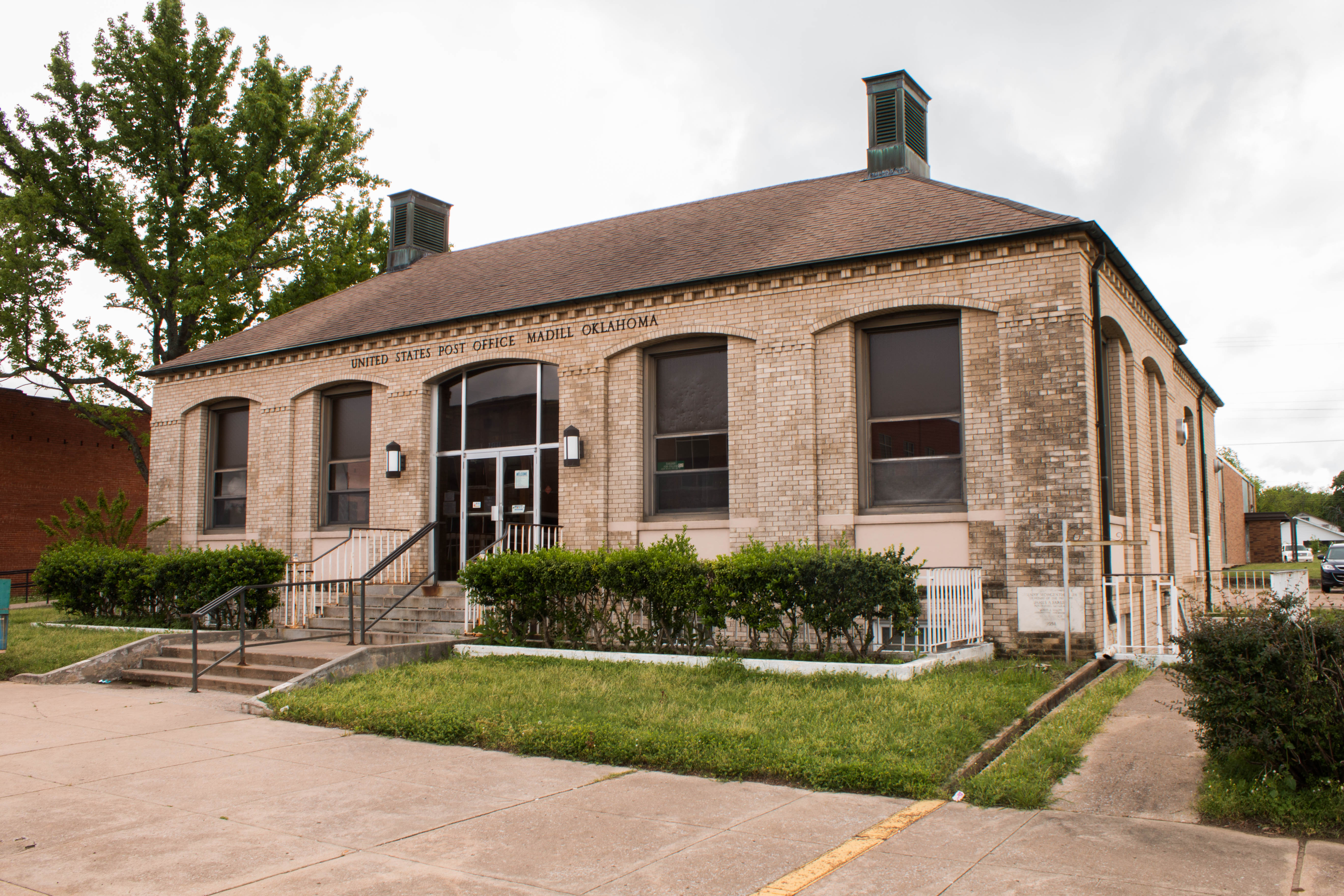
United States Post Office (2016)

=== Climate ===
Climate data for Madill, Oklahoma (1991–2020)
Month	Jan	Feb	Mar	Apr	May	Jun	Jul	Aug	Sep	Oct	Nov	Dec	Year
Mean daily maximum °F (°C)	52.5 (11.4)	57.5 (14.2)	66.0 (18.9)	74.7 (23.7)	81.8 (27.7)	90.2 (32.3)	95.0 (35.0)	94.9 (34.9)	87.4 (30.8)	76.8 (24.9)	64.4 (18.0)	54.4 (12.4)	74.6 (23.7)
Daily mean °F (°C)	41.1 (5.1)	45.3 (7.4)	53.6 (12.0)	62.1 (16.7)	70.9 (21.6)	79.4 (26.3)	84.0 (28.9)	83.2 (28.4)	75.4 (24.1)	64.2 (17.9)	52.5 (11.4)	43.3 (6.3)	62.9 (17.2)
Mean daily minimum °F (°C)	29.8 (−1.2)	33.1 (0.6)	41.3 (5.2)	49.6 (9.8)	59.9 (15.5)	68.5 (20.3)	73.0 (22.8)	71.5 (21.9)	63.5 (17.5)	51.7 (10.9)	40.6 (4.8)	32.2 (0.1)	51.2 (10.7)
Average precipitation inches (mm)	2.22 (56)	2.34 (59)	3.07 (78)	3.53 (90)	5.64 (143)	4.74 (120)	2.72 (69)	2.66 (68)	3.98 (101)	4.55 (116)	2.75 (70)	3.15 (80)	41.35 (1,050)
Average snowfall inches (cm)	0.8 (2.0)	1.1 (2.8)	0.3 (0.76)	0.0 (0.0)	0.0 (0.0)	0.0 (0.0)	0.0 (0.0)	0.0 (0.0)	0.0 (0.0)	0.0 (0.0)	0.0 (0.0)	0.1 (0.25)	2.3 (5.81)
Source: NOAA

== Demographics ==
Historical population
Census	Pop.	Note	%±
1910	1,564		—
1920	2,717		73.7%
1930	2,203		−18.9%
1940	2,594		17.7%
1950	2,791		7.6%
1960	3,084		10.5%
1970	2,875		−6.8%
1980	3,173		10.4%
1990	3,069		−3.3%
2000	3,410		11.1%
2010	3,770		10.6%
2020	3,914		3.8%
U.S. Decennial Census

=== 2020 census ===
As of the 2020 census, Madill had a population of 3,914. The median age was 31.8 years. 29.9% of residents were under the age of 18 and 14.4% of residents were 65 years of age or older. For every 100 females there were 97.6 males, and for every 100 females age 18 and over there were 94.2 males age 18 and over.

0% of residents lived in urban areas, while 100.0% lived in rural areas.

There were 1,358 households in Madill, of which 41.7% had children under the age of 18 living in them. Of all households, 44.0% were married-couple households, 19.6% were households with a male householder and no spouse or partner present, and 28.9% were households with a female householder and no spouse or partner present. About 27.5% of all households were made up of individuals and 11.6% had someone living alone who was 65 years of age or older.

There were 1,508 housing units, of which 9.9% were vacant. Among occupied housing units, 58.9% were owner-occupied and 41.1% were renter-occupied. The homeowner vacancy rate was 2.3% and the rental vacancy rate was 7.0%.

Racial composition as of the 2020 census
Race	Percent
White	50.3%
Black or African American	3.0%
American Indian and Alaska Native	8.0%
Asian	0.7%
Native Hawaiian and Other Pacific Islander	<0.1%
Some other race	22.4%
Two or more races	15.7%
Hispanic or Latino (of any race)	37.0%

=== 2000 census ===
As of the census of 2000, there were 3,410 people, 1,284 households, and 830 families residing in the city. The population density was 1,179.8 inhabitants per square mile (455.5/km^{2}). There were 1,453 housing units at an average density of 502.7 per square mile (194.1/km^{2}). The racial makeup of the city was 64.52% White, 6.04% African American, 6.42% Native American, 0.26% Asian, 0.03% Pacific Islander, 15.84% from other races, and 6.89% from two or more races. Hispanic or Latino of any race were 20.97% of the population.

There were 1,284 households, out of which 32.6% had children under the age of 18 living with them, 47.7% were married couples living together, 12.5% had a female householder with no husband present, and 35.3% were non-families. 32.2% of all households were made up of individuals, and 19.4% had someone living alone who was 65 years of age or older. The average household size was 2.47 and the average family size was 3.12.

In the city, the population was spread out, with 26.8% under the age of 18, 9.7% from 18 to 24, 25.3% from 25 to 44, 18.7% from 45 to 64, and 19.6% who were 65 years of age or older. The median age was 35 years. For every 100 females, there were 90.1 males. For every 100 females age 18 and over, there were 86.3 males.

The median income for a household in the city was $22,457, and the median income for a family was $26,892. Males had a median income of $22,420 versus $18,203 for females. The per capita income for the city was $12,614. About 19.2% of families and 26.1% of the population were below the poverty line, including 36.2% of those under age 18 and 19.7% of those age 65 or over.

== Transportation ==
Madill is served by US Route 70, US Route 177, and US Route 377, as well as State highways 199 and 99C.

BNSF Railway, the successor railroad to the Frisco, has a crew change point here on the line from Dallas to Tulsa. Highways serving Madill include US-70, US-177, US-377, and SH-199.

There is also a small municipal airport (FAA code 1F4) named Madill Municipal Airport, 3 miles (4.8 km) northwest of the city. It has one asphalt runway, 18/36, that is 3,000 feet (910 m) by 60 feet (18 m) at elevation 862 feet (263 m). The airport beacon operates between sunrise and sunset every day. There is no control tower.

== Economy ==
The first manufacturing company to open in Madill was Madill Garment Manufacturing Company, makers of men's dress pants, which started up in 1953. Madill has the oldest Ford Dealership in Oklahoma, Woody Ford. It was established in 1920 by John Woody and has been passed down 3 generations. It is one of the oldest Ford Dealerships in the entire United States. Madill is also well known for its trailer manufacturing firms. These include CM Trailers and WW Trailers. Other businesses include Savage, a manufacturer of agricultural processing equipment, Mid American Steel and Wire a supplier of steel wire for Oklahoma Steel and Wire, and J&I Manufacturing, a maker of truck beds.

Madill has also benefitted from tourism since the completion of Denison Dam and Lake Texoma in 1944. Specifically, the city has hosted the National Sand Bass Festival every June since 1963. The week long event also offers fishing, carnival rides, musical entertainment, and arts and crafts.

== Media ==
The Madill Record, local newspaper, originated as the Oakland News in 1895. It is still in operation and has an electronic version.

== Notable people ==
- Raymond Gary (1908–93), Governor of Oklahoma
- Roy Johnson (1895–1986), baseball player, manager, and coach.
- Bob Muncrief (1918–1996), baseball player
