= National Register of Historic Places listings in Jefferson County, Oklahoma =

Location of Jefferson County in Oklahoma

This is a list of the National Register of Historic Places listings in Jefferson County, Oklahoma.

This is intended to be a complete list of the properties on the National Register of Historic Places in Jefferson County, Oklahoma, United States. The locations of National Register properties for which the latitude and longitude coordinates are included below, may be seen in a map.

There are 7 properties listed on the National Register in the county.

This National Park Service list is complete through NPS recent listings posted October 23, 2026.

== Current listings ==
	Name on the Register	Image	Date listed	Location	City or town	Description
1	Archeological Site 34JF109	Archeological Site 34JF109	December 13, 2010 (#10001014)	Address Restricted	Belleville	
2	First Presbyterian Church	First Presbyterian Church	March 13, 2002 (#02000175)	124 West Broadway; 34°09′54″N 98°00′07″W	Waurika	
3	Irving Baptist Church	Irving Baptist Church	December 3, 2009 (#09000977)	Junction of E2050 and N2770 Roads; 34°02′30″N 98°03′10″W	Ryan	Rural church built in 1928.
4	Jefferson County Courthouse	Jefferson County Courthouse	August 23, 1984 (#84003065)	N. Main St. 34°09′56″N 98°00′04″W	Waurika	
5	Rock Island Passenger Station	Rock Island Passenger Station	March 13, 2002 (#02000173)	105 S. Meridian; 34°09′46″N 97°59′57″W	Waurika	
6	San Bernardo	San Bernardo	March 10, 1982 (#82003685)	Address Restricted	Ringling	
7	State Highway 79 Bridge at the Red River	State Highway 79 Bridge at the Red River	December 20, 1996 (#96001518)	State Highway 79 across the Red River at the Oklahoma-Texas state line 34°07′58″N 98°05′26″W	Byers	Extends into Clay County, Texas

== See also ==
- List of National Historic Landmarks in Oklahoma
- National Register of Historic Places listings in Oklahoma
