= Grady, Oklahoma =

- Unincorporated community
- Location within Oklahoma Location within the United States
- Coordinates: 34°1′13″N 97°39′56″W
- Country: United States
- State: Oklahoma
- County: Jefferson
- Elevation: 850 ft (260 m)
- Time zone: UTC-6 (Central (CST))
  - Summer (DST): UTC-5 (CDT)
- ZIP codes: 73569
- GNIS feature ID: 1093288

Grady is a small rural unincorporated community in southeastern Jefferson County, Oklahoma, United States, along State Highway 32, southeast of the county seat of Waurika. The post office opened June 16, 1890. The ZIP Code is 73569. Grady is said to have been named for Henry W. Grady.

The town had a school which was in operation until around 1967, when it then consolidated and the kids had the option to go to either Ringling or Ryan. Besides a school, it had at one point a grocery store, a cotton gin, blacksmith shop, church, and even a town doctor. The church operated as a Baptist church for 3/4 Sundays of the month, while the other Sunday operated as a Methodist church. It stopped around 1952 and converted to a Methodist only church and operated as a Methodist church until about 1958. Now, the only things in Grady are a couple of houses and a nice metal building serving as the community center.
