= Atlee, Oklahoma =

- Unincorporated community
- Location within Oklahoma Location within the United States
- Coordinates: 34°05′36″N 97°37′57″W
- Country: United States
- State: Oklahoma
- County: Jefferson
- Elevation: 863 ft (263 m)
- Time zone: UTC-6 (Central (CST))
  - Summer (DST): UTC-5 (CDT)
- GNIS feature ID: 1101245

Atlee is an unincorporated community in Jefferson County, Oklahoma, United States. Atlee is about 28 driving miles east-southeast of the county seat of Waurika. Atlee is south of US Route 70, north of Oklahoma State Highway 32, east of US Route 81, and west of Oklahoma State Highway 89.
