= Oklahoma, New Mexico and Pacific Railway =

Former railroad line

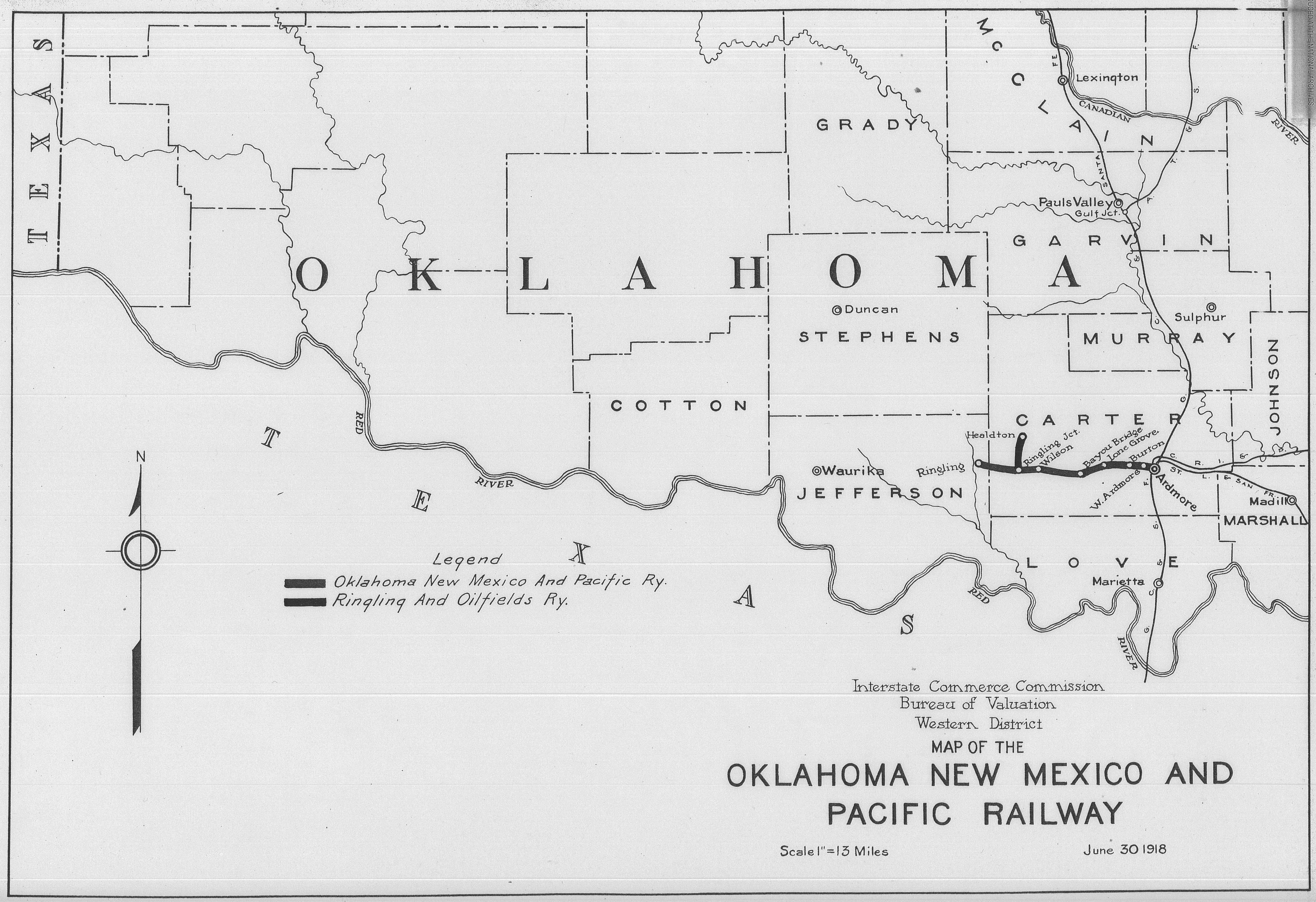
- 1918 map of the railroad

Overview
- Headquarters: Ardmore, Oklahoma
- Locale: Oklahoma
- Dates of operation: 1913–1926

Technical
- Track gauge: 4 ft 8 1/2 in (1,435 mm)
- Length: 45.497 mi (73.220 km)

The Oklahoma, New Mexico and Pacific Railway, known colloquially as the “Ringling Railroad,” ran from Ardmore, Oklahoma to Ringling, Oklahoma, with a branch to Healdton, Oklahoma. It was started in 1913, and was sold to an Atchison, Topeka and Santa Fe Railway (AT&SF) affiliate in 1926.

== History ==
=== The initial line ===
The Oklahoma, New Mexico and Pacific Railway Company was incorporated January 8, 1913 under Oklahoma law by sole stockholder John Ringling. It was intended to run from Ardmore via Waurika to Lawton, Oklahoma, in order to provide market access to farmers and ranchers in south-central and southwestern Oklahoma. The railroad built about 20 miles of road from Ardmore through Lone Grove to what would become the town of Wilson in 1913, and in 1914 built a further 10 miles of road west from Wilson. However, due to the August 1913 discovery of oil in the Healdton field, being the very area through which the railroad was building, westbound construction on the line was stopped in January 1914 at a location in eastern Jefferson County about one mile north of the existing town of Cornish. This location became the boom town of Ringling, fed both by the petroleum industry and by Cornish citizens and business leaders moving to Ringling to be near the railroad.

=== Ringling and Oil Fields Railway ===
The Ringling and Oil Fields Railway (“Oil Fields”) was created as a separate entity on November 23, 1916, under Oklahoma Law, with pretentions of building all the way from the existing Ringling Railroad line north to Oklahoma City. However, it actually constructed only about 6 miles of track in the 1916-1917 timeframe from a point on the existing line called Ringling Junction (about 5 miles east of Ringling) to the town of Healdton. That line was then leased to the Ringling Railroad to operate on September 15, 1917, for a period of 99 years.

=== Operations ===
A detailed snapshot of the Ringling Railroad as of June 30, 1918 showed the operation as a single track, standard gauge steam railway with a 29.981 mainline between Ardmore and Ringling, along with 8.012 miles of yard tracks and sidings, for a total of 37.993 miles. The leased Oil Fields trackage added 5.913 miles from Ringling Junction to Healdton along with 1.591 miles of yard tracks and sidings, so the Ringling Railroad was operating a grand total of 45.497 miles of track. It owned no rolling stock, instead leasing 4 steam locomotives, 22 freight cars, 5 passenger cars, and 5 work equipment units from Western Car and Locomotive Company. Its principal office was in Ardmore, and it built stations in Ardmore and Healdton. It had direct interchanges with AT&SF's Gulf, Colorado and Santa Fe Railway, the Chicago, Rock Island and Pacific Railroad, and the St. Louis–San Francisco Railway, all in Ardmore. The oil fields around Healdton furnished a great part of its traffic.

=== Healdton and Santa Fe Railway ===
The AT&SF incorporated a separate subsidiary, the Healdton and Santa Fe Railway Company, in Oklahoma on October 13, 1925, to purchase the properties of both the Ringling Railroad and Oil Fields. That acquisition was approved by the Interstate Commerce Commission on July 17, 1926, and the Ringling Railroad operated to October 15, 1926. The system was leased the same year to the Gulf, Colorado and Santa Fe Railway. In subsequent history, the Santa Fe filed for abandonment on the entire Ringling system in 1973, and abandonment occurred in 1976.
