= Sugden, Oklahoma =

- Town
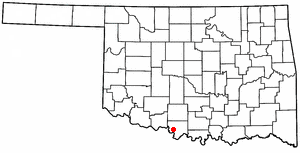
- Location of Sugden, Oklahoma
- Coordinates: 34°4′53″N 97°58′43″W
- Country: United States
- State: Oklahoma
- County: Jefferson

Area
  - Total: 0.23 sq mi (0.60 km^{2})
  - Land: 0.23 sq mi (0.60 km^{2})
  - Water: 0 sq mi (0.00 km^{2})
- Elevation: 846 ft (258 m)

Population (2020)
  - Total: 22
  - Density: 95.1/sq mi (36.73/km^{2})
- Time zone: UTC-6 (Central (CST))
  - Summer (DST): UTC-5 (CDT)
- FIPS code: 40-71250
- GNIS feature ID: 2413347

Sugden is a town in Jefferson County, Oklahoma, United States. The population was 22 as of the 2020 United States census.

The townsite is located on what was a ranch established around 1874 by brothers Joseph D. ”Ikard” Sugg and Eli Calvin “Cal” Sugg. A store named “Sugg’s Den” was established there, and a settlement grew around it. A post office was added in November 1893, which was designated Sugden. Said post office closed in November 1955.

== Geography ==
Sugden is located in southwestern Jefferson County at 34°4′53″N 97°58′43″W (34.081288, -97.978665). It is about 8 miles (13 km) by road south of the county seat of Waurika, and just west of US Route 81.

According to the United States Census Bureau, the town has a total area of 0.22 square miles (0.56 km^{2}), all land. Sugden sits on the west side of the valley of Beaver Creek, a south-flowing tributary of the Red River.

== Demographics ==
Historical population
Census	Pop.	Note	%±
1910	321		—
1920	218		−32.1%
1930	146		−33.0%
1940	171		17.1%
1950	105		−38.6%
1960	68		−35.2%
1970	54		−20.6%
1980	76		40.7%
1990	65		−14.5%
2000	59		−9.2%
2010	43		−27.1%
2020	22		−48.8%
U.S. Decennial Census

=== 2020 census ===
As of the 2020 census, Sugden had a population of 22. The median age was 58.5 years. 22.7% of residents were under the age of 18 and 36.4% of residents were 65 years of age or older. For every 100 females there were 83.3 males, and for every 100 females age 18 and over there were 88.9 males age 18 and over.

0.0% of residents lived in urban areas, while 100.0% lived in rural areas.

There were 12 households in Sugden, of which 66.7% had children under the age of 18 living in them. Of all households, 41.7% were married-couple households, 16.7% were households with a male householder and no spouse or partner present, and 41.7% were households with a female householder and no spouse or partner present. About 16.7% of all households were made up of individuals and 0.0% had someone living alone who was 65 years of age or older.

There were 18 housing units, of which 33.3% were vacant. The homeowner vacancy rate was 0.0% and the rental vacancy rate was 100.0%.

Racial composition as of the 2020 census
Race	Number	Percent
White	14	63.6%
Black or African American	0	0.0%
American Indian and Alaska Native	4	18.2%
Asian	0	0.0%
Native Hawaiian and Other Pacific Islander	0	0.0%
Some other race	1	4.5%
Two or more races	3	13.6%
Hispanic or Latino (of any race)	4	18.2%

=== 2000 census ===
As of the 2000 census there were 59 people, 20 households, and 18 families residing in the town. The population density was 272.8 inhabitants per square mile (105.3/km^{2}). There were 23 housing units at an average density of 106.4 per square mile (41.1/km^{2}). The racial makeup of the town was 88.14% white, 6.78% Native American, 5.08% from other races. Hispanic or Latino of any race were 10.17% of the population.

There were 20 households, out of which 50.0% had children under the age of 18 living with them, 80.0% were married couples living together, 10.0% had a female householder with no husband present, and 10.0% were non-families. 10.0% of all households were made up of individuals, and 10.0% had someone living alone who was 65 years of age or older. The average household size was 2.95 and the average family size was 3.17.

In the town, the population was spread out, with 28.8% under the age of 18, 10.2% from 18 to 24, 28.8% from 25 to 44, 15.3% from 45 to 64, and 16.9% who were 65 years of age or older. The median age was 32 years. For every 100 females, there were 126.9 males. For every 100 females age 18 and over, there were 121.1 males.

The median income for a household in the town was $20,000, and the median income for a family was $21,250. Males had a median income of $16,667 versus $26,250 for females. The per capita income for the town was $8,676. There were 18.8% of families and 16.9% of the population living below the poverty line, including 21.1% of under eighteens and none of those over 64.
