= Oklahoma State Highway 96 =

State highway in Oklahoma, United States

State Highway 96

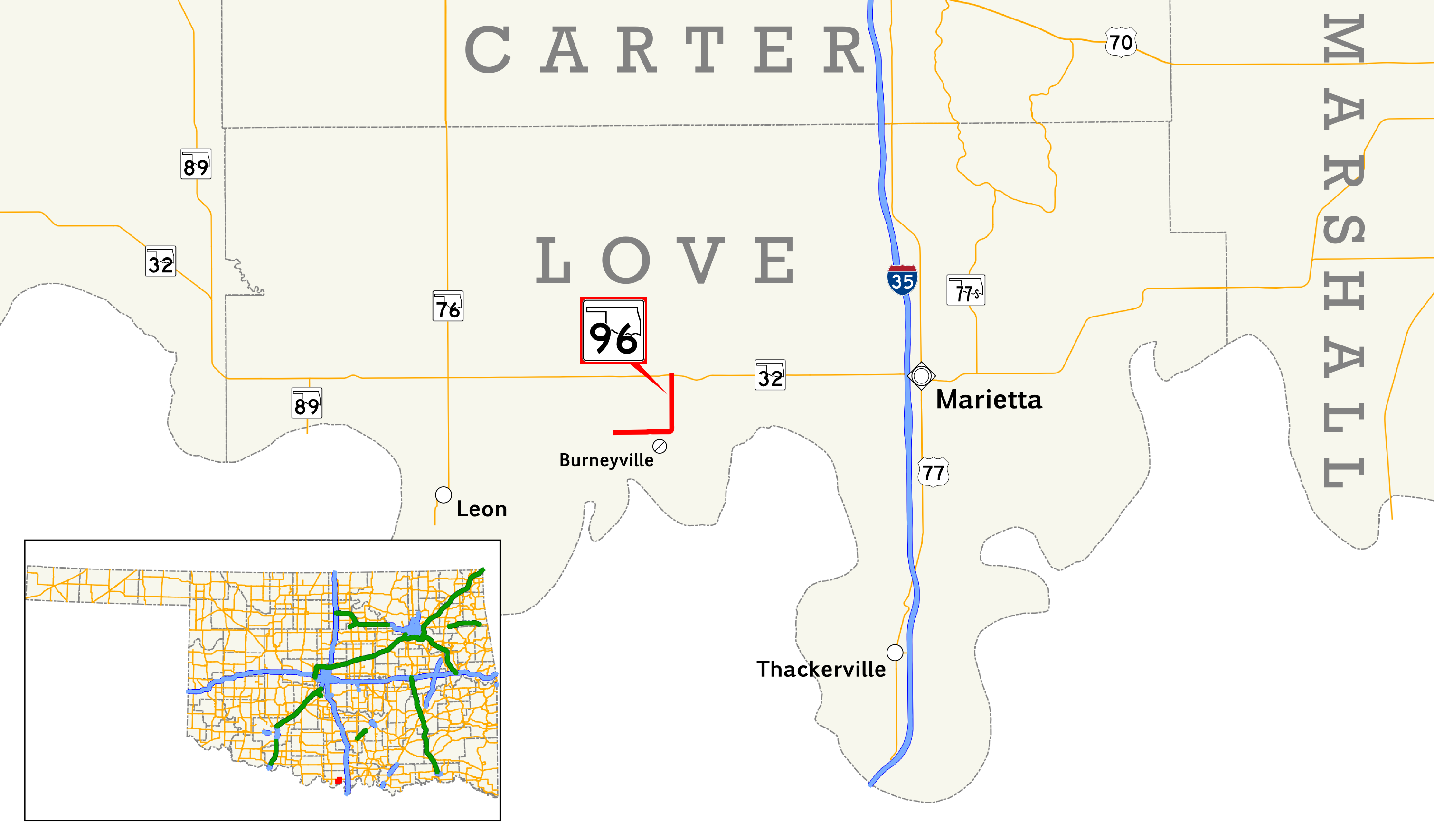

Route information
- Maintained by ODOT
- Length: 4.01 mi (6.45 km)
- Existed: c. 1957–present

Major junctions
- South end: West of Burneyville
- North end: SH-32 at Dunbar

Location
- Country: United States
- State: Oklahoma

Highway system
- Oklahoma State Highway System; Interstate; US; State; Turnpikes
← SH-95	→ SH-97

State Highway 96 (abbreviated SH-96) is a short, four-mile (6.4 km) highway in Love Co., Oklahoma. It runs south from State Highway 32 to Burneyville, curves west and turns into Burneyville Road. It has no lettered spur routes.

SH-96 was created in the mid-1950s. Initially, the highway had a gravel surface.

== Route description ==
State Highway 96 begins along Burneyville Road, which it follows for two miles (3.2 km). The road then turns north, crossing over Simon Creek, before coming to an end at SH-32 at Dunbar, an unincorporated place. The roadbed continues north as Eastman Road.

SH-96 serves the Burneyville area, which includes the Falconhead Resort & Country Club, a former PGA Tour golf course, and the Red River Research and Demonstration Farm, an agricultural research operation run by the Samuel Roberts Noble Foundation.

== History ==
State Highway 96 was first shown on the 1958 state highway map (implying its creation in 1957) as a gravel highway. The route was otherwise identical to that of the present day. The route was paved over the following year.

== Junction list ==
The entire route is in Love County.

Location	mi	km	Destinations	Notes
Burneyville	0.00	0.00	Burneyville Road	Southern terminus
Dunbar	4.01	6.45	SH-32	Northern terminus
1.000 mi = 1.609 km; 1.000 km = 0.621 mi
