= Oklahoma State Highway 32 =

Highway in Oklahoma

State Highway 32

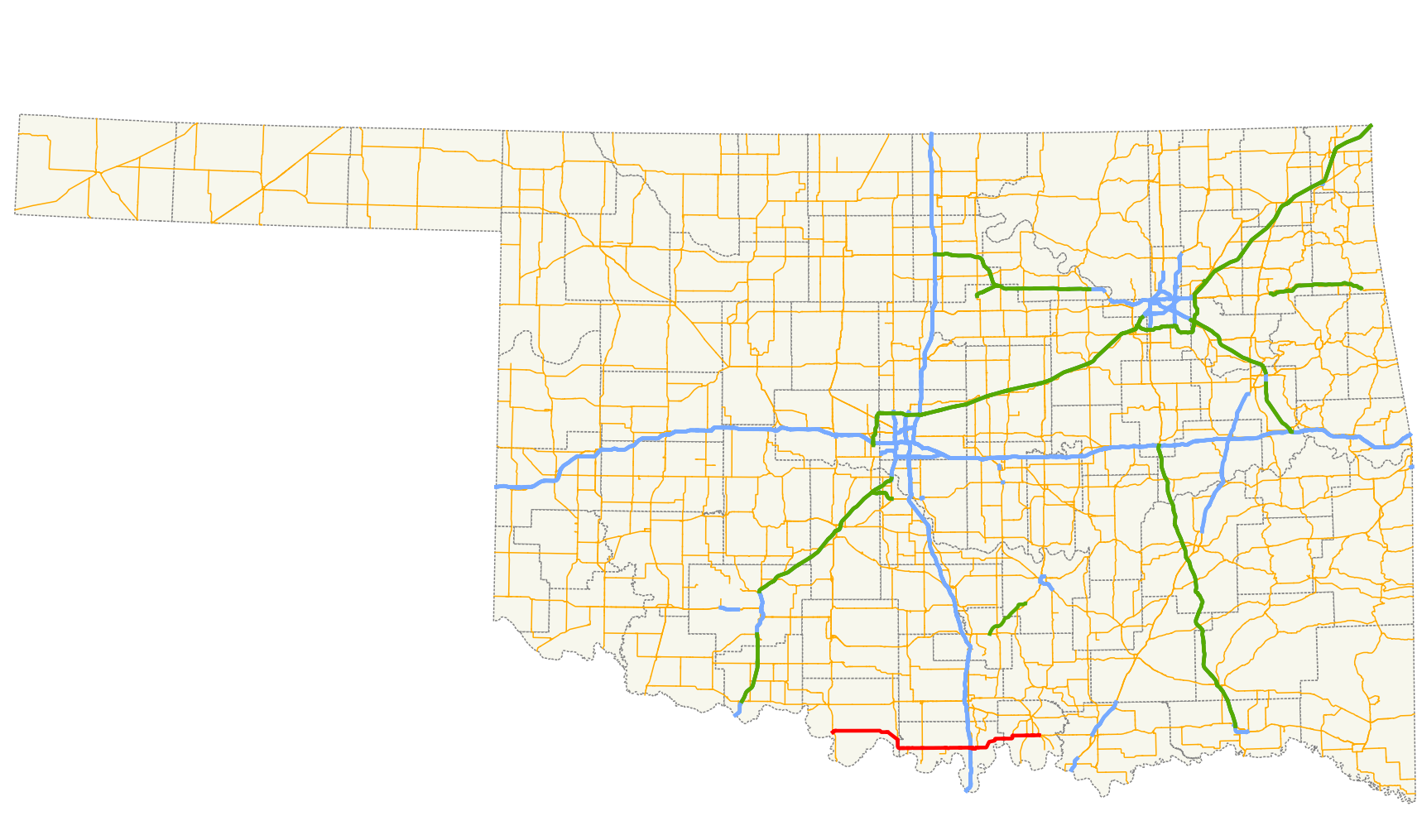

Route information
- Maintained by ODOT
- Length: 77.3 mi (124.4 km)
- Existed: December 12, 1934–present

Major junctions
- West end: US 81 in Ryan
- I-35 in Marietta; US 77 in Marietta; US 377 / SH-99 near Kingston
- East end: US 70 in Kingston

Location
- Country: United States
- State: Oklahoma

Highway system
- Oklahoma State Highway System; Interstate; US; State; Turnpikes
← SH-31	→ SH-33

State Highway 32 (SH-32 or OK-32) is a state highway in the U.S. state of Oklahoma. The highway runs from west to east across the southern part of the state, just north of the Red River. The route begins at US-81 in Ryan and ends at US-70 in Kingston, a length of 77.3 miles (124.4 km).

SH-32 was first added to the state highway system at the end of 1934; none of the highway as created is part of the present-day SH-32 (having been encroached upon by US-70). SH-32 is also linked with SH-199—part of SH-32 was spun off to create SH-199 in 1938.

== Route description ==
SH-32 begins at US-81 in Ryan, where it follows the street grid, heading in a northeast direction. As the route leaves Ryan, it turns onto a due east course. It is 17 miles (27 km) until the next town, Grady. SH-32 turns to the southeast to serve this town. Six more miles (10 km) from Grady, SH-32 meets another highway for the first time, SH-89. At the junction, SH-32 turns south, overlapping SH-89 for six miles (9.7 km). While concurrent, the two highways pass through the unincorporated community of Petersburg, then turn to the west. The two routes divide at Courtney, where SH-89 heads south towards the Red River and Texas.

SH-32 continues east from Courtney, crossing over Mud Creek, then passing through unincorporated Rubottom. East of Rubottom, the highway comes to the intersection with SH-76. The next unincorporated community SH-32 passes through is Turner. Eight miles (13 km) east of the SH-76 junction, at Dunbar, SH-32 serves as the northern terminus of SH-96, which serves Burneyville.

Nine miles (14 km) east of Burneyville, SH-32 has an interchange with I-35 outside Marietta, the seat of Love County. Soon after passing I-35, SH-32 forms a brief concurrency with US-77, and passes through Marietta. East of town, the route comes to a junction with SH-77S (one of SH-77S's four termini). SH-32 continues east, following the curve of Lake Texoma's shoreline, passing through Lebanon. The highway then intersects with SH-99C.

Five miles (8 km) east of SH-99C, SH-32 crosses US-377/SH-99. Two miles (3.2 km) further east, SH-32 acts as the southern endpoint of SH-70F. Two miles (3.2 km) after that, SH-32 ends at US-70 in Kingston.

== History ==
State Highway 32 was commissioned on December 12, 1934. As originally created, the route ran from SH-14 (present-day US-183) in Davidson to Waurika, passing through the towns of Grandfield, Devol, and Randlett and the counties of Tillman, Cotton, and Jefferson. SH-32 was extended to cover approximately the west half of its present-day route on June 16, 1936; the route's new eastern terminus was US-77 in Marietta. On March 29, 1937, the highway was expanded even further east to end at US-70 in Madill. This extension was split off to form SH-199 on October 13, 1938.

Meanwhile, changes were occurring in the eastern part of Jefferson County. The portion of highway from Ryan east to the Love County line was removed from the highway system on December 31, 1937. As a result, SH-32 was discontiguous; one section stretched from Davidson to Ryan, while another began at a spur ending at the Jefferson–Love county line and continued east from there. The portion of SH-32 concurrent with US-81 between Waurika and Ryan, once necessary to connect to the now-decommissioned road, was removed on February 24, 1938. Both of these sections of road were reinstated as part of SH-32 on February 29, 1944.

Changes in the routing of US-70 in the 1930s and 1940s resulted in the western part of SH-32 becoming concurrent with the U.S. highway through southwest Oklahoma during the late-1930s. US-70 as first designated in Oklahoma crossed into the state north of Burkburnett, Texas and intersected SH-32 in Randlett; continuing north of SH-32, the U.S. highway turned east, running through Walters. In Comanche, US-70 turned south along US-81 and followed it until reaching the present-day US-70 routing in Waurika. Between Randlett and Waurika, SH-32 provided a much more direct route. On May 6, 1936, US-70 was realigned to follow SH-32 between these two cities. On March 3, 1945, US-70 was realigned again. This brought the highway into Oklahoma much earlier, crossing the Red River much further west, in effect bypassing Wichita Falls, Texas. As a result of the realignment, US-70 intersected SH-32 at its western terminus in Davidson and followed it all the way to Waurika. The westernmost 64 miles (103 km) of SH-32 (as measured along the present-day US-70 alignment) were concurrent with US-70.

SH-32 was resumed its expansion to the east on September 16, 1946. On that date, the highway's eastern terminus was set at its present location at US-70 in Kingston. Much of this extension reclaimed for SH-32 the stretch of road lost by the creation of SH-199. At this time, SH-32 was at its zenith; stretching from Davidson to Kingston, the route covered a total of 152 miles (245 km) along present-day roads. However, the westernmost 64 miles (103 km) of SH-32 still overlapped US-70.

On September 6, 1966, after over twenty years of cosignage, SH-32 was truncated to its current western terminus in Ryan. Everything west of Waurika was now solely US-70. After the truncation of 1966, SH-32 had the same route that it does today.

== Junction list ==
County	Location	mi	km	Destinations	Notes
Jefferson	Ryan	0.0	0.0	US 81	Western terminus
Jefferson		23.3	37.5	SH-89	Western end of SH-89 concurrency
Love	Courtney	29.5	47.5	SH-89	Eastern end of SH-89 concurrency
Love		34.5	55.5	SH-76	
Love	Dunbar	42.5	68.4	SH-96	Northern terminus of SH-96
Love	Marietta	51.0	82.1	I-35	I-35 exit 15
Love	Marietta	51.5	82.9	US 77	Northern end of US-77 concurrency
Love	Marietta	51.7	83.2	US 77	Southern end of US-77 concurrency
Love	Marietta	53.8	86.6	SH-77S	2nd terminus of SH-77S going clockwise (southernmost terminus)
Marshall		68.2	109.8	SH-99C	Southern terminus of SH-99C
Marshall		73.1	117.6	US 377 / SH-99	
Marshall	Kingston	77.3	124.4	US 70	Eastern terminus
1.000 mi = 1.609 km; 1.000 km = 0.621 mi: Concurrency terminus
