= 1988 United States presidential election in Oklahoma =

- November 8, 1988

| Nominee | George H. W. Bush | Michael Dukakis |
| Party | Republican | Democratic |
| Home state | Texas | Massachusetts |
| Running mate | Dan Quayle | Lloyd Bentsen |
| Electoral vote | 8 | 0 |
| Popular vote | 678,367 | 483,423 |
| Percentage | 57.93% | 41.28% |

Bush
40–50%
50–60%
60–70%
70–80%
80–90%
90–100%
Dukakis
40–50%
50–60%
60–70%
70–80%
80–90%
90–100%
Other
Tie
No votes
No data/unmatched (Note: 1990 U.S. Census Voting Tabulation Districts (VTDs), with revisions, were used in place of true precincts for 74 of 77 counties. Not all VTDs were able to be matched to precinct data—these are offset in a separate color. Only votes for Bush and Dukakis were available, accounting for 99.21% of votes cast for president.)
President before election
Ronald Reagan
Republican
Elected President
George H. W. Bush
Republican

The 1988 United States presidential election in Oklahoma took place on November 8, 1988. All fifty states and the District of Columbia, were part of the 1988 United States presidential election. Oklahoma voters chose eight electors to the Electoral College, which selected the president and vice president.

Oklahoma was won by incumbent United States Vice President George H. W. Bush of Texas, who was running against Massachusetts Governor Michael Dukakis. Bush ran with Indiana Senator Dan Quayle as Vice President, and Dukakis ran with Texas Senator Lloyd Bentsen.

The election was very partisan, with more than 99 percent of the electorate voting for either the Democratic or Republican parties, and only four candidates appearing on the ballot. The Southeastern portion of the state resumed turning out in large numbers for the Democratic Party; in 1984 almost all its counties voted in majority for Reagan. This may be somewhat attributed to the influence of the ongoing drought and the farming crisis in the Great Plains, and of the politically volatile state of Texas, which was also changing its political orientation through the 1980s and 1990s from a Democratic area to a largely Republican one. Bush's dominance in the more populated metro Oklahoma City and Tulsa ensured a safe GOP victory. However, despite Bush and Quayle winning the state, Oklahoma swung more to the Democrats from 1984 to 1988 than any other state in the nation, swinging by 21.30 percentage points. Additionally, this remains the last time that a Democrat has won more than sixty percent of the vote in any Oklahoma county (these being Jefferson, Haskell, Hughes, Coal and Choctaw).

Bush easily won Oklahoma on election day, defeating Dukakis by a 16-point margin. Oklahoma weighed in for this election as 9 percentage points more Republican than the national average.

== Results ==
1988 United States presidential election in Oklahoma
| Party | Candidate | Votes | Percentage | Electoral votes |
|---|---|---|---|---|
| Republican | George H. W. Bush | 678,367 | 57.93% | 8 |
| Democratic | Michael Dukakis | 483,423 | 41.28% | 0 |
| Libertarian | Ron Paul | 6,261 | 0.53% | 0 |
| New Alliance Party | Lenora Fulani | 2,985 | 0.25% | 0 |
| Totals | | 1,171,036 | 100.0% | 8 |

=== Results by county ===
| County | George H.W. Bush Republican | | Michael Dukakis Democratic | | Ron Paul Libertarian | | Lenora Fulani New Alliance | | Margin | | Total votes cast |
| County | # | % | # | % | # | % | # | % | # | % | Total votes cast |
|---|---|---|---|---|---|---|---|---|---|---|---|
| Adair | 3,558 | 57.02% | 2,624 | 42.05% | 36 | 0.58% | 22 | 0.35% | 934 | 14.97% | 6,240 |
| Alfalfa | 1,960 | 62.58% | 1,117 | 35.66% | 33 | 1.05% | 22 | 0.70% | 843 | 26.92% | 3,132 |
| Atoka | 1,971 | 43.13% | 2,565 | 56.13% | 19 | 0.42% | 15 | 0.33% | -594 | -13.00% | 4,570 |
| Beaver | 2,013 | 71.03% | 777 | 27.42% | 37 | 1.31% | 7 | 0.25% | 1,236 | 43.61% | 2,834 |
| Beckham | 3,463 | 50.08% | 3,388 | 48.99% | 41 | 0.59% | 23 | 0.33% | 75 | 1.09% | 6,915 |
| Blaine | 2,889 | 61.03% | 1,775 | 37.49% | 48 | 1.01% | 22 | 0.46% | 1,114 | 23.54% | 4,734 |
| Bryan | 4,615 | 40.13% | 6,849 | 59.55% | 21 | 0.18% | 16 | 0.14% | -2,234 | -19.42% | 11,501 |
| Caddo | 4,689 | 46.07% | 5,387 | 52.93% | 67 | 0.66% | 34 | 0.33% | -698 | -6.86% | 10,177 |
| Canadian | 17,872 | 70.00% | 7,453 | 29.19% | 139 | 0.54% | 66 | 0.26% | 10,419 | 40.81% | 25,530 |
| Carter | 8,430 | 50.98% | 7,988 | 48.31% | 72 | 0.44% | 45 | 0.27% | 442 | 2.67% | 16,535 |
| Cherokee | 5,838 | 46.99% | 6,483 | 52.18% | 68 | 0.55% | 35 | 0.28% | -645 | -5.19% | 12,424 |
| Choctaw | 2,217 | 39.60% | 3,362 | 60.05% | 15 | 0.27% | 5 | 0.09% | -1,145 | -20.45% | 5,599 |
| Cimarron | 1,153 | 70.01% | 470 | 28.54% | 21 | 1.28% | 3 | 0.18% | 683 | 41.47% | 1,647 |
| Cleveland | 36,313 | 61.62% | 22,067 | 37.44% | 407 | 0.69% | 146 | 0.25% | 14,246 | 24.18% | 58,933 |
| Coal | 891 | 39.25% | 1,365 | 60.13% | 9 | 0.40% | 5 | 0.22% | -474 | -20.88% | 2,270 |
| Comanche | 17,464 | 60.02% | 11,441 | 39.32% | 104 | 0.36% | 90 | 0.31% | 6,023 | 20.70% | 29,099 |
| Cotton | 1,266 | 45.62% | 1,482 | 53.41% | 17 | 0.61% | 10 | 0.36% | -216 | -7.79% | 2,775 |
| Craig | 2,463 | 45.23% | 2,940 | 53.98% | 24 | 0.44% | 19 | 0.35% | -477 | -8.75% | 5,446 |
| Creek | 11,308 | 53.89% | 9,512 | 45.33% | 99 | 0.47% | 63 | 0.30% | 1,796 | 8.56% | 20,982 |
| Custer | 6,735 | 63.98% | 3,697 | 35.12% | 66 | 0.63% | 29 | 0.28% | 3,038 | 28.86% | 10,527 |
| Delaware | 5,248 | 51.39% | 4,889 | 47.88% | 45 | 0.44% | 30 | 0.29% | 359 | 3.51% | 10,212 |
| Dewey | 1,543 | 60.49% | 963 | 37.75% | 28 | 1.10% | 17 | 0.67% | 580 | 22.74% | 2,551 |
| Ellis | 1,422 | 63.37% | 786 | 35.03% | 27 | 1.20% | 9 | 0.40% | 636 | 28.34% | 2,244 |
| Garfield | 15,248 | 64.78% | 8,067 | 34.27% | 156 | 0.66% | 67 | 0.28% | 7,181 | 30.51% | 23,538 |
| Garvin | 5,109 | 47.94% | 5,438 | 51.03% | 84 | 0.79% | 25 | 0.23% | -329 | -3.09% | 10,656 |
| Grady | 7,994 | 53.84% | 6,689 | 45.05% | 116 | 0.78% | 49 | 0.33% | 1,305 | 8.79% | 14,848 |
| Grant | 1,690 | 56.71% | 1,249 | 41.91% | 29 | 0.97% | 12 | 0.40% | 441 | 14.80% | 2,980 |
| Greer | 1,225 | 48.94% | 1,256 | 50.18% | 13 | 0.52% | 9 | 0.36% | -31 | -1.24% | 2,503 |
| Harmon | 611 | 40.63% | 890 | 59.18% | 2 | 0.13% | 1 | 0.07% | -279 | -18.55% | 1,504 |
| Harper | 1,281 | 67.42% | 593 | 31.21% | 14 | 0.74% | 12 | 0.63% | 688 | 36.21% | 1,900 |
| Haskell | 1,822 | 37.73% | 2,963 | 61.36% | 26 | 0.54% | 18 | 0.37% | -1,141 | -23.63% | 4,829 |
| Hughes | 2,037 | 38.24% | 3,259 | 61.18% | 19 | 0.36% | 12 | 0.23% | -1,222 | -22.94% | 5,327 |
| Jackson | 4,423 | 55.28% | 3,542 | 44.27% | 24 | 0.30% | 12 | 0.15% | 881 | 11.01% | 8,001 |
| Jefferson | 1,063 | 37.35% | 1,767 | 62.09% | 7 | 0.25% | 9 | 0.32% | -704 | -24.74% | 2,846 |
| Johnston | 1,518 | 42.39% | 2,042 | 57.02% | 14 | 0.39% | 7 | 0.20% | -524 | -14.63% | 3,581 |
| Kay | 12,646 | 61.50% | 7,751 | 37.69% | 112 | 0.54% | 55 | 0.27% | 4,895 | 23.81% | 20,564 |
| Kingfisher | 4,011 | 68.54% | 1,777 | 30.37% | 45 | 0.77% | 19 | 0.32% | 2,234 | 38.17% | 5,852 |
| Kiowa | 2,030 | 46.58% | 2,296 | 52.68% | 19 | 0.44% | 13 | 0.30% | -266 | -6.10% | 4,358 |
| Latimer | 1,830 | 43.23% | 2,365 | 55.87% | 20 | 0.47% | 18 | 0.43% | -535 | -12.64% | 4,233 |
| LeFlore | 6,964 | 51.05% | 6,594 | 48.34% | 63 | 0.46% | 20 | 0.15% | 370 | 2.71% | 13,641 |
| Lincoln | 6,409 | 59.67% | 4,225 | 39.34% | 67 | 0.62% | 39 | 0.36% | 2,184 | 20.33% | 10,740 |
| Logan | 6,947 | 59.36% | 4,603 | 39.33% | 117 | 1.00% | 37 | 0.32% | 2,344 | 20.03% | 11,704 |
| Love | 1,361 | 41.66% | 1,889 | 57.82% | 12 | 0.37% | 5 | 0.15% | -528 | -16.16% | 3,267 |
| McClain | 4,771 | 56.44% | 3,594 | 42.52% | 35 | 0.95% | 16 | 0.44% | 1,177 | 13.92% | 8,453 |
| McCurtain | 4,920 | 49.64% | 4,928 | 49.72% | 16 | 0.34% | 12 | 0.26% | -8 | -0.08% | 9,911 |
| McIntosh | 2,665 | 39.53% | 4,041 | 59.94% | 55 | 0.43% | 40 | 0.31% | -1,376 | -20.41% | 6,742 |
| Major | 2,638 | 71.86% | 982 | 26.75% | 68 | 0.80% | 20 | 0.24% | 1,656 | 45.11% | 3,671 |
| Marshall | 1,911 | 40.93% | 2,730 | 58.47% | 37 | 0.37% | 26 | 0.26% | -819 | -17.54% | 4,669 |
| Mayes | 6,115 | 47.40% | 6,691 | 51.86% | 23 | 0.34% | 13 | 0.19% | -576 | -4.46% | 12,901 |
| Murray | 2,056 | 42.89% | 2,697 | 56.26% | 29 | 0.60% | 12 | 0.25% | -641 | -13.37% | 4,794 |
| Muskogee | 11,147 | 44.47% | 13,760 | 54.89% | 98 | 0.39% | 63 | 0.25% | -2,613 | -10.42% | 25,068 |
| Noble | 3,015 | 63.80% | 1,661 | 35.15% | 32 | 0.68% | 18 | 0.38% | 1,354 | 28.65% | 4,726 |
| Nowata | 2,000 | 47.24% | 2,203 | 52.03% | 16 | 0.38% | 15 | 0.35% | -203 | -4.79% | 4,234 |
| Okfuskee | 1,851 | 45.17% | 2,209 | 53.90% | 21 | 0.51% | 17 | 0.41% | -358 | -8.73% | 4,098 |
| Oklahoma | 135,376 | 63.59% | 75,812 | 35.61% | 1,162 | 0.55% | 541 | 0.25% | 59,564 | 27.98% | 212,891 |
| Okmulgee | 5,674 | 40.52% | 8,262 | 59.00% | 40 | 0.29% | 28 | 0.20% | -2,588 | -18.48% | 14,004 |
| Osage | 7,162 | 47.57% | 7,778 | 51.66% | 75 | 0.50% | 40 | 0.27% | -616 | -4.09% | 15,055 |
| Ottawa | 5,026 | 42.85% | 6,658 | 56.77% | 27 | 0.23% | 18 | 0.15% | -1,632 | -13.92% | 11,729 |
| Pawnee | 3,324 | 53.94% | 2,781 | 45.13% | 42 | 0.68% | 15 | 0.24% | 543 | 8.81% | 6,162 |
| Payne | 16,027 | 59.57% | 10,568 | 39.28% | 233 | 0.87% | 77 | 0.29% | 5,459 | 20.29% | 26,905 |
| Pittsburg | 7,594 | 46.47% | 8,623 | 52.77% | 78 | 0.48% | 47 | 0.29% | -1,029 | -6.30% | 16,342 |
| Pontotoc | 6,609 | 49.92% | 6,484 | 48.98% | 95 | 0.72% | 51 | 0.39% | 125 | 0.94% | 13,239 |
| Pottawatomie | 12,099 | 57.15% | 8,873 | 41.92% | 133 | 0.63% | 64 | 0.30% | 3,226 | 15.23% | 21,169 |
| Pushmataha | 1,841 | 42.80% | 2,430 | 56.50% | 16 | 0.37% | 14 | 0.33% | -589 | -13.70% | 4,301 |
| Roger Mills | 1,132 | 56.26% | 866 | 43.04% | 11 | 0.55% | 3 | 0.15% | 266 | 13.22% | 2,012 |
| Rogers | 12,940 | 59.22% | 8,771 | 40.14% | 103 | 0.47% | 37 | 0.17% | 4,169 | 19.08% | 21,851 |
| Seminole | 4,078 | 44.95% | 4,911 | 54.13% | 53 | 0.58% | 31 | 0.34% | -833 | -9.18% | 9,073 |
| Sequoyah | 5,710 | 53.22% | 4,951 | 46.15% | 52 | 0.48% | 16 | 0.15% | 759 | 7.07% | 10,729 |
| Stephens | 9,844 | 55.32% | 7,833 | 44.02% | 71 | 0.40% | 47 | 0.26% | 2,011 | 11.30% | 17,795 |
| Texas | 4,971 | 73.62% | 1,717 | 25.43% | 40 | 0.59% | 24 | 0.36% | 3,254 | 48.19% | 6,752 |
| Tillman | 1,754 | 44.65% | 2,148 | 54.68% | 15 | 0.38% | 11 | 0.28% | -394 | -10.03% | 3,928 |
| Tulsa | 127,512 | 64.48% | 69,044 | 34.91% | 862 | 0.44% | 345 | 0.17% | 58,468 | 29.57% | 197,763 |
| Wagoner | 10,219 | 57.68% | 7,378 | 41.64% | 86 | 0.49% | 35 | 0.20% | 2,841 | 16.04% | 17,718 |
| Washington | 14,613 | 67.30% | 6,971 | 32.11% | 90 | 0.41% | 39 | 0.18% | 7,642 | 35.19% | 21,713 |
| Washita | 2,402 | 50.62% | 2,290 | 48.26% | 38 | 0.80% | 15 | 0.32% | 112 | 2.36% | 4,745 |
| Woods | 2,835 | 60.95% | 1,735 | 37.30% | 51 | 1.10% | 30 | 0.65% | 1,100 | 23.65% | 4,651 |
| Woodward | 4,996 | 66.68% | 2,408 | 32.14% | 56 | 0.75% | 33 | 0.44% | 2,588 | 34.54% | 7,493 |
| Totals | 678,367 | 57.93% | 483,423 | 41.28% | 6,261 | 0.53% | 2,985 | 0.25% | 194,944 | 16.65% | 1,171,036 |

==== Counties that flipped from Republican to Democratic ====
- Atoka
- Bryan
- Caddo
- Cherokee
- Choctaw
- Cotton
- Craig
- Garvin
- Greer
- Harmon
- Jefferson
- Johnston
- Kiowa
- Latimer
- Love
- McCurtain
- McIntosh
- Marshall
- Mayes
- Murray
- Muskogee
- Nowata
- Okfuskee
- Okmulgee
- Osage
- Ottawa
- Pittsburg
- Pushmataha
- Seminole
- Tillman

== Slates of Electors ==
Democrat: Lou Rogers Watkins, M. David Riggs, Loretta Y. Jackson, Fred L. Boettcher, C. Pat Frank, Randy L. Beutler, Neil McElderry Jr, Demetrius Bereolos

Republican: Ron Collett, Lavelle Dennis, Mary Lou Mathis, Joyce Perring, Art Rubin, Susan Kay Schroeder, Rosemary Tarr, Dorothy Zumwalt

Libertarian: F. G. Litzaw, Brian W. Holk, G. Dennis Garland, Paul O. Woodward, Mary E. Laurent, Debby L. Wair, Whitney L. Boutin Jr, Michael A. Wair

New Alliance: Sandra Williams, Susanne Michelle Adams, Carol J. Mizell, Toni A. Zucconi, Tania Ann Zucconi, Rhonda K. Tsotigh, Jeffrey L. Fuller, Carl Jonathan Wood

== See also ==
- United States presidential elections in Oklahoma
- Presidency of George H. W. Bush
