= Fleetwood, Oklahoma =

- Unincorporated community
- Location within Oklahoma Location within the United States
- Coordinates: 33°53′48″N 97°51′04″W
- Country: United States
- State: Oklahoma
- County: Jefferson
- Elevation: 846 ft (258 m)
- Time zone: UTC-6 (Central (CST))
  - Summer (DST): UTC-5 (CDT)
- GNIS feature ID: 1100415

Fleetwood is an unincorporated community in Jefferson County, Oklahoma, United States. It is about 25 driving miles south-southeast of the county seat of Waurika, and just east of US Route 81. It was named after H.H. Fleetwood, who was a ferry operator on the Red River. A post office was open in Fleetwood from 1885 to 1961.
