= Waurika station =

Railway station in Waurika, Oklahoma, United States

Waurika
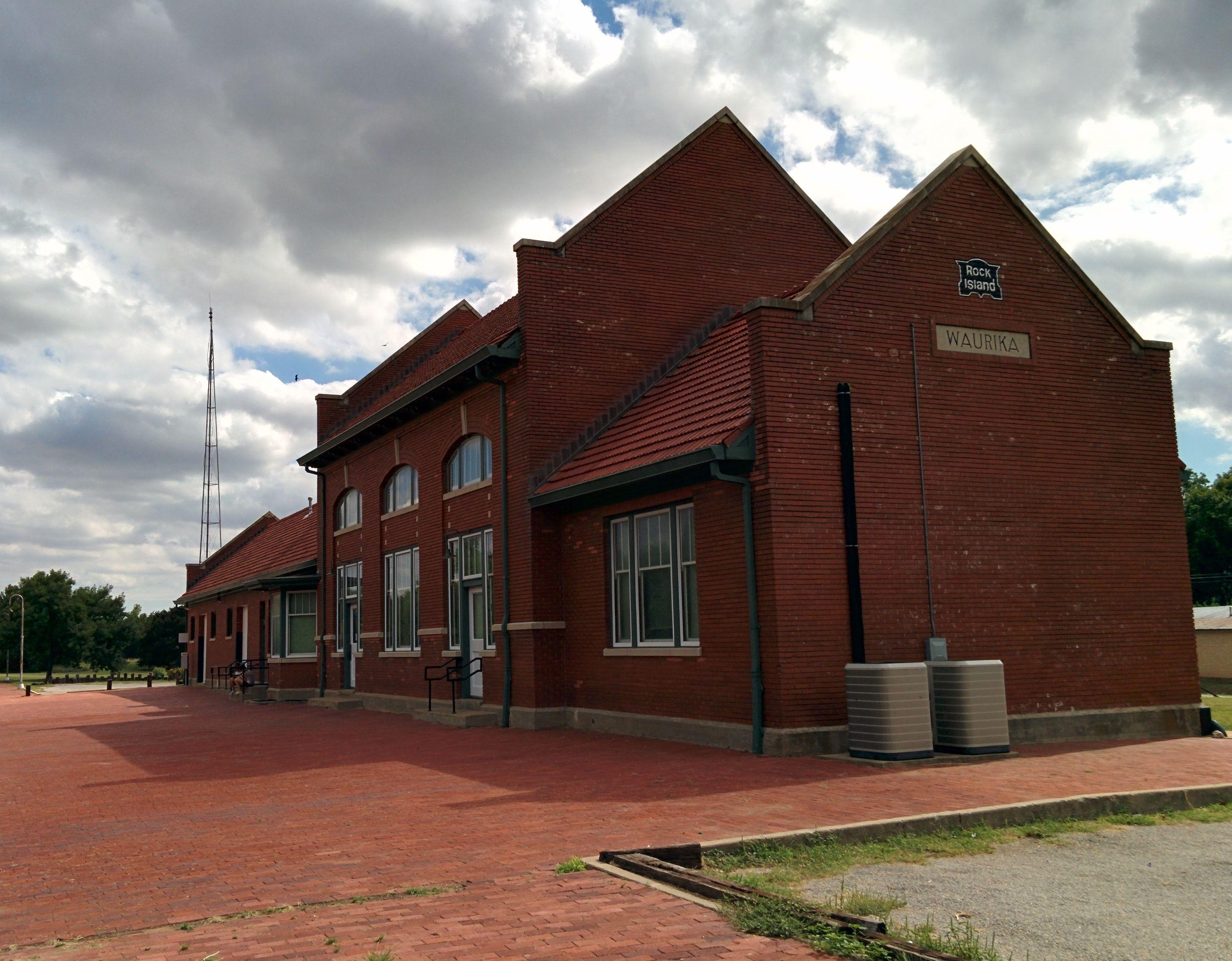

General information
- Location: 105 S. Meridian; Waurika, Oklahoma
- Coordinates: 34°09′46″N 97°59′57″W
- System: Former Rock Island Line passenger rail station

History
- Opened: 1912

Former services
Preceding station	Chicago, Rock Island and Pacific Railroad	Following station
Sugden toward Teague	Teague – Minneapolis	Comanche toward Minneapolis
- Rock Island Passenger Station
- U.S. National Register of Historic Places
- NRHP reference No.: 02000173
- Added to NRHP: March 13, 2002
Location

Waurika station is a former railway station in Waurika, Oklahoma, United States. It opened for service on August 20, 1912 by the Chicago, Rock Island and Pacific Railroad. The Wichita Falls and Oklahoma Railway (subsidiary of the Chicago, Burlington and Quincy Railroad) additionally utilized the depot when their tracks reached Waurika in 1923. It was used by the railroad until 1980 and sold to the city in 1984. The building was rehabilitated between 1987 and 1990 to be converted to a community space. It was added to the National Register of Historic Places on March 13, 2002.
