= Murder of Jared Lakey =

2019 murder by police officers in Oklahoma

- Location of Carter County within Oklahoma
- Location: Carter County, Oklahoma, United States
- Date: July 4, 2019; 7 years ago
- Attack type: Murder by tasing, police brutality
- Weapon: Taser
- Victim: Jared Lakey
- Perpetrators: Joshua L. Taylor; Brandon C. Dingman
- Verdict: Guilty
- Convictions: Second degree murder
- Sentence: 10 years in prison (parole possible after 8 1/2 years)

On July 4, 2019, police officers Joshua L. Taylor and Brandon C. Dingman of the Wilson Police Department in Carter County, Oklahoma, murdered Jared Lakey, a 28-year-old man, by applying taser shocks to him 53 times, causing him to die of cardiac arrest. The police had been responding to an incident of disorderly conduct, and found Lakey acting confused and disoriented, although he was unarmed and not combative. Rather than restraining him, they repeatedly applied taser shocks to Lakey while he was lying on the ground, and made no attempt to provide lifesaving treatment. They speculated that Lakey had been using illicit drugs, but toxicology results found none in his system.

The two officers were both prosecuted for second degree murder. They were found guilty and were each sentenced to the mandatory minimum of 10 years in prison. They are required to serve 8½ years before becoming eligible for parole.

== Murder ==
The police had been responding to a report of disorderly conduct involving a naked man shouting incoherently and running down the road, and encountered Lakey, who did not comply with their commands, acting confused and disoriented, although he was unarmed and not combative. Taylor was the acting chief of police at the time of the incident, and he arrived first on the scene. Taylor's body camera was not activated until Dingman arrived and Lakey was already lying on the ground with Taylor standing over him in a steady stance. The first recorded words spoken in the incident were Dingman repeatedly saying "Put your hands behind your back for me", followed by Taylor saying "Non-compliance is gonna get you tased." Lakey screamed repeatedly, pleading for the officers to stop and asking for help while he lay on the ground being shocked by the officers' taser weapons. The final part of the incident was captured on video by two body cameras and a dashboard camera.

In the nine-minute encounter with the officers, Lakey never struck or acted aggressively toward them, and the two officers made no attempt to physically restrain him – only to shout commands and repeatedly taser him – even when he was lying still on the ground. A third officer then arrived and placed Lakey in a chokehold for about 40 seconds as he was being handcuffed. The officers on the scene speculated that Lakey had been using PCP, a dissociative, hallucinogenic drug that can produce erratic and violent behavior, but the autopsy report later found no drugs in his system. The blood analysis showed Lakey had a high blood sugar level, which can cause confusion, stupor and disorientation. There were no other unusual indications found from the autopsy to explain Lakey's behavior.

The Oklahoma district attorney said the officers' training program prescribed a limitation of 15 seconds for taser shock exposures, which was also the guidance provided by the manufacturer of the devices. However, the two officers applied tasers to Lakey for a total of 3 minutes and 14 seconds.

== Lakey's background ==
Lakey had been raised in the Lone Grove and Wilson area of Oklahoma and while in school he had played football and lifted weights. At the time of the incident, he was employed in Chickasha by Cimarron Trailers, a company that produces custom-built aluminum trailers, and had been working there for nine months. In his spare time, he enjoyed playing music and video games.

== Murder conviction ==
Joshua Taylor and Brandon Dingman, the two officers who had used tasers on Lakey, were found guilty by a jury of second degree murder on November 8, 2021. No charges were filed against the third officer, although the chokehold may have been a contributing factor in Lakey's death. In the trial, the defense argued unsuccessfully that it was the 40-second chokehold rather than the taser shocks that had caused Lakey's death. Both Dingman and Taylor received sentences of 10 years in prison, and each of them must serve 8 1/2 years of their sentences before becoming eligible for parole.
