= Ryan Public Schools =

School district in Oklahoma, United States

Ryan Public Schools is a school district headquartered in the Ryan School Administration Building in Ryan, Oklahoma. It contains an elementary school and a combined middle/high school.

As of 2019 Marcus Chapman is the superintendent and the elementary school principal while Tony Tomberlin is the high school principal.
