= Oklahoma State Highway 79 =

State highway in Oklahoma, United States

State Highway 79

Route information
- Maintained by ODOT
- Length: 4.43 mi (7.13 km)
- Existed: ca. 1938–present

Major junctions
- South end: SH 79 at the Texas state line near Waurika
- North end: US 70 west of Waurika

Location
- Country: United States
- State: Oklahoma

Highway system
- Oklahoma State Highway System; Interstate; US; State; Turnpikes
← SH-78	→ SH-80

State Highway 79 (abbreviated SH-79 or OK-79) is a state highway in Jefferson County, Oklahoma. It runs for 4.43 miles (7.13 km) as a continuation of Texas State Highway 79 to U.S. Highway 70 on the outskirts of Waurika. It has no lettered spur routes.

SH-79 was first commissioned in 1938, and has had the same route since then.

== Route description ==
Oklahoma's State Highway 79 begins where Texas's State Highway 79 crosses over the Red River from Clay County, Texas into Jefferson County, Oklahoma. Beginning in 1939, a multiple-span pony truss bridge carried the highway across the river. This bridge was replaced by a new bridge in 2018. Upon reaching the shore, the highway continues on a northeast trajectory, rising out of the Red River valley. The highway then comes to an end at US-70 on the southwest outskirts of Waurika.

== History ==
State Highway 79 is first shown on the April 1939 state highway map. It has the same extent on that map as it does today, although it had a dirt surface. By 1941, the whole route had been upgraded to asphalt.

== Junction list ==
The entire route is in Jefferson County.

Location	mi	km	Destinations	Notes
Red River	0.00	0.00	SH 79 south	Continuation into Texas
Waurika	4.43	7.13	US 70 – Grandfield, Waurika	Northern terminus
1.000 mi = 1.609 km; 1.000 km = 0.621 mi
