= Oklahoma State Highway 89 =

State highway in Oklahoma, United States

State Highway 89

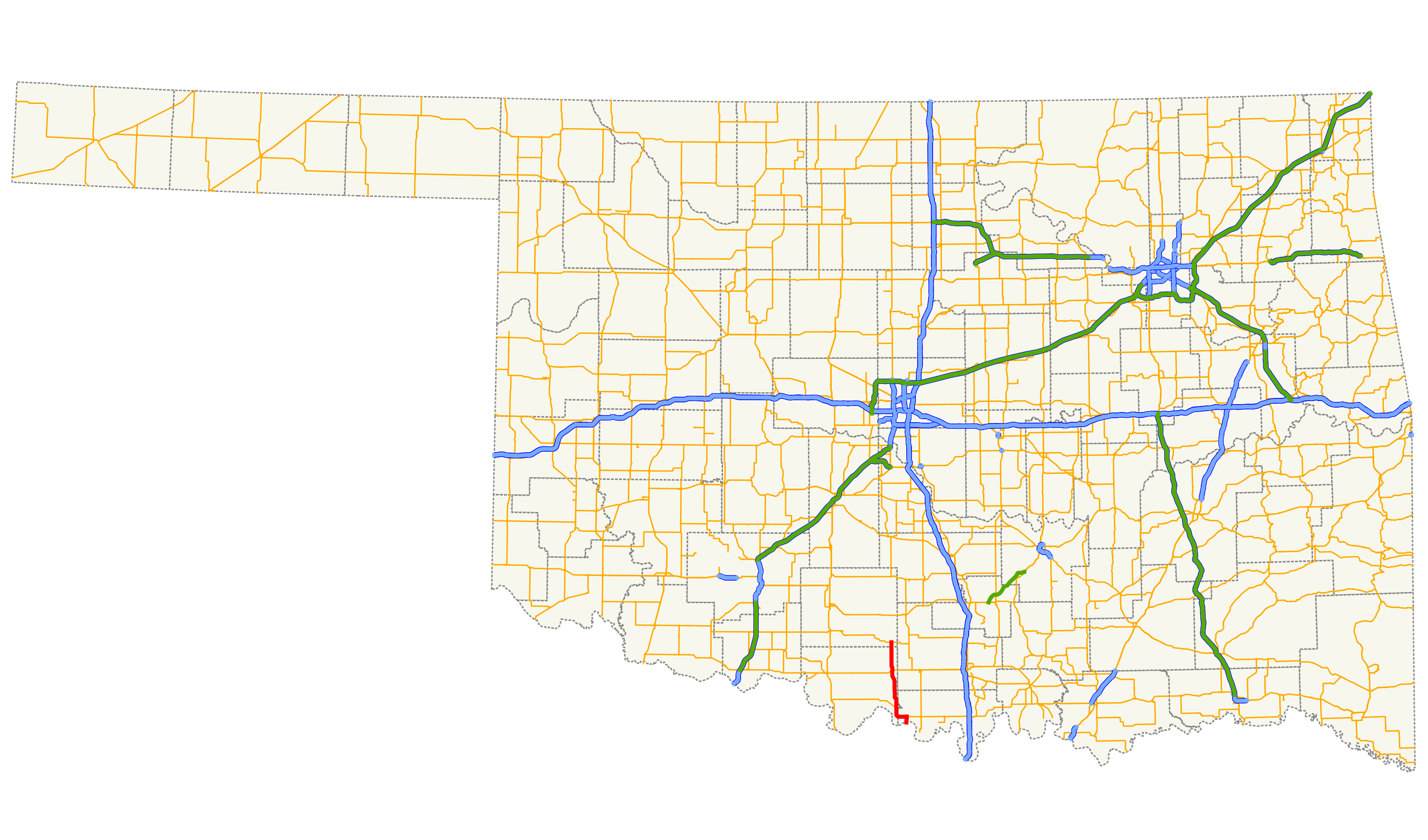

Route information
- Maintained by ODOT
- Length: 30.3 mi (48.8 km)
- Existed: July 26, 1944–present

Major junctions
- South end: FM 677 at the Texas state line near Courtney
- US 70 in Ringling
- North end: SH-53 east of Loco

Location
- Country: United States
- State: Oklahoma

Highway system
- Oklahoma State Highway System; Interstate; US; State; Turnpikes
← SH-88	→ SH-91

State Highway 89 (abbreviated SH-89 or OK-89) is a state highway in the southern part of the U.S. state of Oklahoma. It runs from the Taovayas Indian Bridge at the Texas state line to State Highway 53, a distance of 30.3 miles (48.8 km). SH-89 was initially designated on July 26, 1944. It has no lettered spur routes.

== Route description ==
State Highway 89 begins at the Taovayas Indian Bridge on the Illinois Bend of the Red River, continuing Farm to Market Road 677 from Texas. One mile (1.6 km) north of the river, it intersects SH-32 at Courtney. SH-89 overlaps SH-32 for 6.1 miles (9.8 km), initially headed due west, but curving around to the northwest and eventually the north, crossing into Jefferson County and passing through unincorporated Petersburg. SH-32 then angles off to the northwest while SH-89 continues on a due north course.

After splitting off to the north, SH-89 travels through eastern Jefferson County for 13.4 miles (21.6 km), generally paralleling the county line. The highway continues along a rough northerly heading, though it briefly heads northwest at times. SH-89 runs to the east of the town of Cornish, and then intersects US-70 as it enters Ringling. After passing through the town, it curves northwest. SH-89 then turns back to a due north course, which it will maintain for the rest of its existence. The highway comes to an end 9.8 miles (15.8 km) north of Ringling at SH-53 east of Loco.

== History ==
State Highway 89 was first added to the Oklahoma state highway system on July 26, 1944. The original extent of the highway was from the current northern junction with SH-32 to US-70 in Ringling. These remained the route's termini until January 21, 1957, when it was extended north through Ringling to SH-53, setting its northern terminus at its present location. Minor realignments would take place during the next two years, after which the highway would remain the same for three decades.

On September 6, 1994, the highway was extended south. SH-89 now overlapped SH-32 to Courtney, where it split away towards its new southern terminus at the Texas state line. The highway has undergone no further changes since this extension.

== Junction list ==
County	Location	mi	km	Destinations	Notes
Love		0.0	0.0	FM 677	Southern terminus, Texas state line
Love	Courtney	1.0	1.6	SH-32	SH-32 joins northbound and splits southbound
Jefferson		7.1	11.4	SH-32	SH-32 joins southbound and splits northbound
Jefferson	Ringling	20.5	33.0	US 70	
Stephens		30.3	48.8	SH-53	Northern terminus
1.000 mi = 1.609 km; 1.000 km = 0.621 mi
