= Cornish, Oklahoma =

- Town
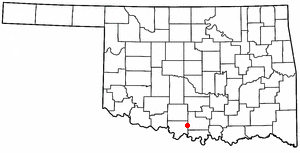
- Location of Cornish, Oklahoma
- Coordinates: 34°09′49″N 97°35′47″W
- Country: United States
- State: Oklahoma
- County: Jefferson

Area
  - Total: 0.60 sq mi (1.56 km^{2})
  - Land: 0.60 sq mi (1.56 km^{2})
  - Water: 0 sq mi (0.00 km^{2})
- Elevation: 873 ft (266 m)

Population (2020)
  - Total: 110
  - Density: 182.7/sq mi (70.54/km^{2})
- Time zone: UTC-6 (Central (CST))
  - Summer (DST): UTC-5 (CDT)
- FIPS code: 40-17350
- GNIS feature ID: 2413243

Cornish is an incorporated town in eastern Jefferson County, Oklahoma, United States. The population was 110 as of the 2020 United States census.

== History ==
Prior to statehood, Cornish was a community in Pickens County of the Chickasaw Nation. It was named for John E. Cornish, a local resident and cattle rancher. A post office opened in Cornish July 10, 1891 and lasted until March 15, 1918. M. E. "Mose" Harris founded the Cornish Orphans Home and began construction in 1907. The home would continue this work for the next forty years.

The Healdton Oilfield was discovered in August 1910, approximately 8 miles (13 km) northeast of Cornish. The town of Ringling, just a mile north of Cornish, was founded in June 1914, near the discovery and on the Oklahoma, New Mexico and Pacific Railway. (Note: The railway was never extended to Cornish.) Many Cornish businessmen and other residents moved to Ringling, and Cornish dwindled away.

== Geography ==
Cornish is located 25 miles (40 km) east of Waurika and 27 miles (43 km) west of Ardmore, and is situated on US Route 70.

According to the United States Census Bureau, the town has a total area of 0.6 square miles (1.6 km^{2}), all land.

== Demographics ==
Historical population
Census	Pop.	Note	%±
1900	307		—
1910	489		59.3%
1920	261		−46.6%
1930	186		−28.7%
1940	234		25.8%
1950	152		−35.0%
1960	127		−16.4%
1970	90		−29.1%
1980	115		27.8%
1990	164		42.6%
2000	172		4.9%
2010	163		−5.2%
2020	110		−32.5%
U.S. Decennial Census

=== 2020 census ===
As of the 2020 census, Cornish had a population of 110. The median age was 51.5 years. 19.1% of residents were under the age of 18 and 21.8% of residents were 65 years of age or older. For every 100 females there were 93.0 males, and for every 100 females age 18 and over there were 89.4 males age 18 and over.

0.0% of residents lived in urban areas, while 100.0% lived in rural areas.

There were 53 households in Cornish, of which 35.8% had children under the age of 18 living in them. Of all households, 45.3% were married-couple households, 26.4% were households with a male householder and no spouse or partner present, and 22.6% were households with a female householder and no spouse or partner present. About 32.1% of all households were made up of individuals and 15.1% had someone living alone who was 65 years of age or older.

There were 53 housing units, of which 0.0% were vacant. The homeowner vacancy rate was 0.0% and the rental vacancy rate was 0.0%.

Racial composition as of the 2020 census
Race	Number	Percent
White	76	69.1%
Black or African American	1	0.9%
American Indian and Alaska Native	6	5.5%
Asian	4	3.6%
Native Hawaiian and Other Pacific Islander	0	0.0%
Some other race	0	0.0%
Two or more races	23	20.9%
Hispanic or Latino (of any race)	2	1.8%

=== 2000 census ===
As of the census of 2000, there were 172 people, 66 households, and 48 families residing in the town. The population density was 292.0 inhabitants per square mile (112.7/km^{2}). There were 75 housing units at an average density of 127.3 per square mile (49.2/km^{2}). The racial makeup of the town was 69.77% White, 6.40% Native American, 0.58% Asian, 10.47% from other races, and 12.79% from two or more races. Hispanic or Latino of any race were 13.95% of the population.

There were 66 households, out of which 36.4% had children under the age of 18 living with them, 57.6% were married couples living together, 13.6% had a female householder with no husband present, and 25.8% were non-families. 25.8% of all households were made up of individuals, and 12.1% had someone living alone who was 65 years of age or older. The average household size was 2.61 and the average family size was 3.10.

In the town, the population was spread out, with 30.2% under the age of 18, 5.2% from 18 to 24, 31.4% from 25 to 44, 19.8% from 45 to 64, and 13.4% who were 65 years of age or older. The median age was 36 years. For every 100 females, there were 95.5 males. For every 100 females age 18 and over, there were 100.0 males.

The median income for a household in the town was $16,000, and the median income for a family was $18,750. Males had a median income of $16,750 versus $18,500 for females. The per capita income for the town was $8,981. About 26.9% of families and 27.9% of the population were below the poverty line, including 16.7% of those under the age of eighteen and 56.0% of those 65 or over.
