= State Highway 79 Bridge at the Red River =

- U.S. National Register of Historic Places
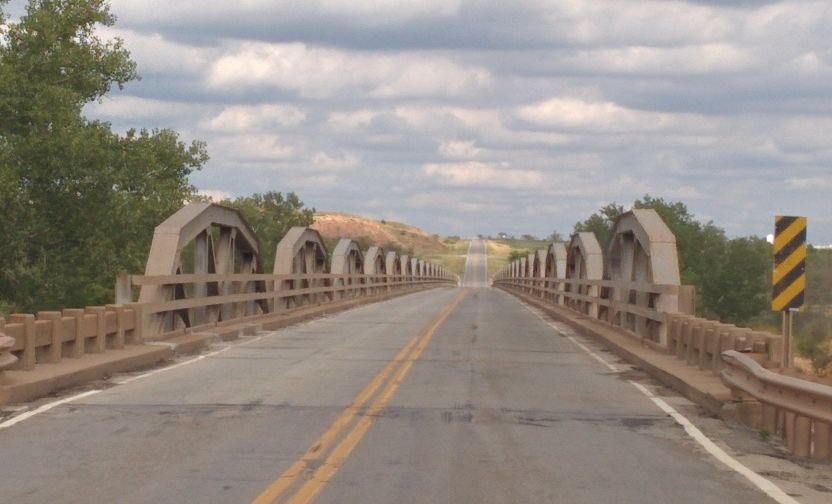
- State Highway 79 Bridge

- Location within Oklahoma Location within Texas Location within the United States
- Location: Between Texas State Highway 79 and Oklahoma State Highway 79 over Red River
- Nearest city: Byers, Texas, Waurika, Oklahoma
- Coordinates: 34°7′56″N 98°5′39″W
- Area: 1.5 acres (0.61 ha)
- Built: 1939
- Built by: Multiple
- Architectural style: Camelback pony truss
- Demolished: 2018
- MPS: Historic Bridges of Texas MPS
- NRHP reference No.: 96001518
- Added to NRHP: December 20, 1996

The State Highway 79 Bridge at the Red River was a bridge carrying Texas State Highway 79 and Oklahoma State Highway 79 over the Red River at the Texas-Oklahoma state line. The camelback pony truss bridge was 2,255 feet (687 m) long and had 21 truss spans. The Texas and Oklahoma highway departments built the bridge as a combined project in 1939. The bridge provided a direct route between Waurika, Oklahoma and Byers and Wichita Falls in Texas. The bridge was the only camelback pony truss bridge remaining on a Texas state highway and the fourth-longest truss bridge in the Texas state highway system prior to being demolished.

The bridge was added to the National Register of Historic Places on December 20, 1996.

In 2018, a new bridge was built at the location of the old bridge before the old bridge was demolished.

== See also ==
- National Register of Historic Places listings in Jefferson County, Oklahoma
- National Register of Historic Places listings in Clay County, Texas
- List of bridges on the National Register of Historic Places in Oklahoma
- List of bridges on the National Register of Historic Places in Texas
