= National Register of Historic Places listings in Clay County, Texas =

Location of Clay County in Texas

This is a list of the National Register of Historic Places listings in Clay County, Texas.

This is intended to be a complete list of properties listed on the National Register of Historic Places in Clay County, Texas. There are two properties listed on the National Register in the county. One property is also a State Antiquities Landmark and includes two Recorded Texas Historic Landmarks.

This National Park Service list is complete through NPS recent listings posted March 21, 2025.

== Current listings ==
The locations of National Register properties may be seen in a mapping service provided.

	Name on the Register	Image	Date listed	Location	City or town	Description
1	Clay County Courthouse and Jail	Clay County Courthouse and Jail	October 3, 1978 (#78002904)	100 N. Bridge St. 33°48′57″N 98°11′45″W	Henrietta	State Antiquities Landmark, includes Recorded Texas Historic Landmarks
2	State Highway 79 Bridge at the Red River	State Highway 79 Bridge at the Red River	December 20, 1996 (#96001518)	OK 79 across the Red River at the OK-TX state line 34°07′56″N 98°05′39″W	Byers	Historic Bridges of Texas, 1866-1945 MPS; extends into Jefferson County, Oklahoma

== See also ==
- National Register of Historic Places listings in Texas
- List of bridges on the National Register of Historic Places in Texas
- Recorded Texas Historic Landmarks in Clay County
