= Wilson Assembly of God Church =

Coordinates: 34°09′46″N 97°25′14″W

Wilson Assembly of God
- Wilson Assembly of God
- Location: Wilson, Oklahoma
- Country: U.S.
- Denomination: Pentecostal
- Website: http://100701.agchurches.org/

History
- Status: Church
- Founded: 1922

Architecture
- Functional status: Active

Wilson Assembly of God, founded in 1922, is one of the oldest churches in the state of Oklahoma affiliated with the Assemblies of God USA. The Assemblies of God began in 1917 in Arkansas. The church has been an integral part of Wilson, Oklahoma, and the surrounding areas. The Wilson Museum has many articles relating to the ministry and the pastors of this church.
