= Oscar, Oklahoma =

- Unincorporated community
- Location within Oklahoma Location within the United States
- Coordinates: 33°59′2″N 97°45′10″W
- Country: United States
- State: Oklahoma
- County: Jefferson
- Elevation: 886 ft (270 m)
- Time zone: UTC-6 (Central (CST))
  - Summer (DST): UTC-5 (CDT)
- ZIP Codes: 73561
- GNIS feature ID: 1100708

Oscar is a small rural unincorporated community in southern Jefferson County, Oklahoma, United States, three miles north of the Red River. The town was named after Oscar W. Seay, a local rancher. The post office opened on November 23, 1892. The ZIP Code is 73561. The first Postmaster was William Riley Butler, by presidential appointment. The population is unknown.
