= Ringling, Oklahoma =

- Town
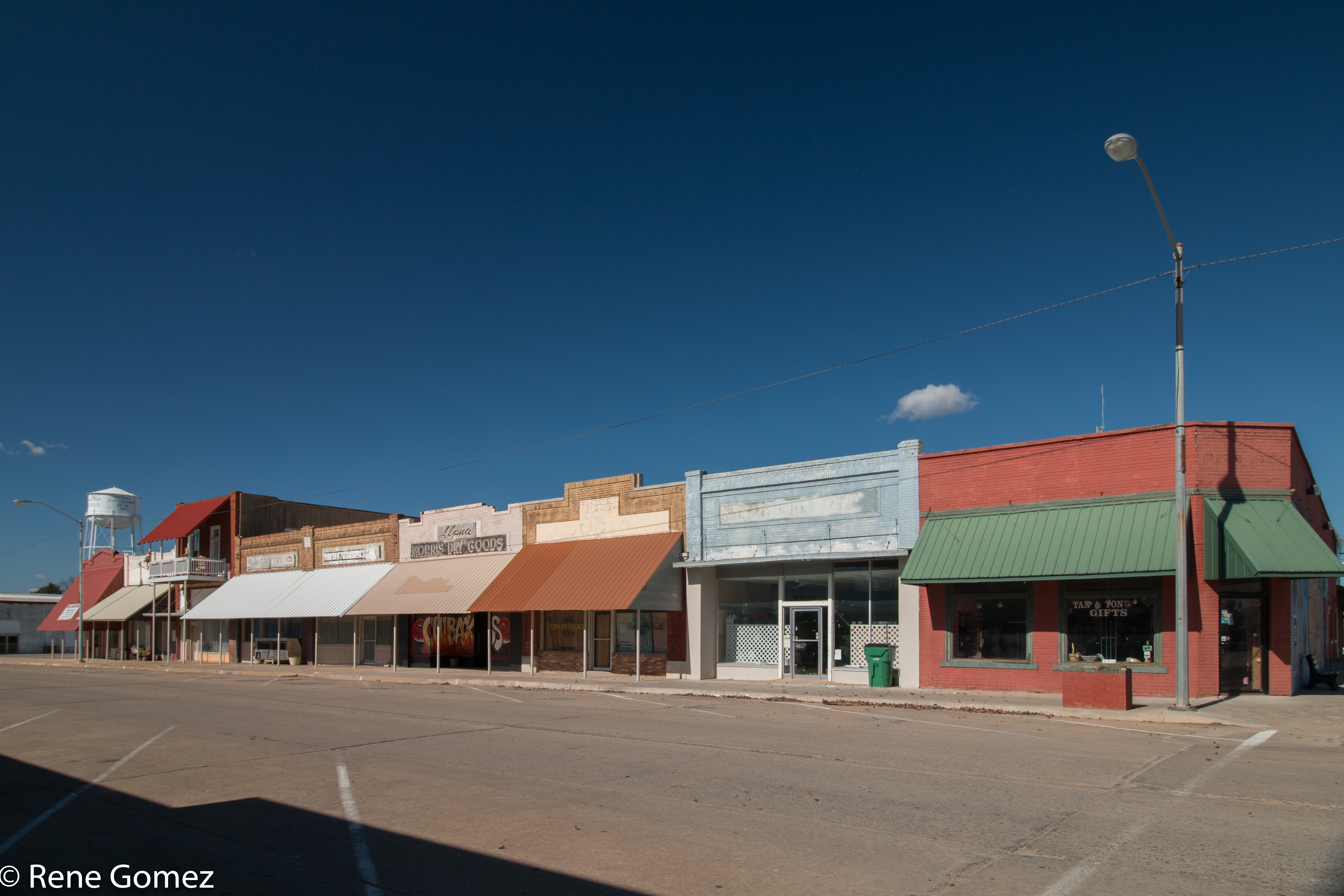

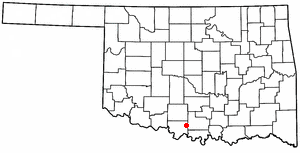
- Location of Ringling, Oklahoma
- Coordinates: 34°10′38″N 97°35′29″W
- Country: United States
- State: Oklahoma
- County: Jefferson

Area
  - Total: 0.78 sq mi (2.03 km^{2})
  - Land: 0.78 sq mi (2.03 km^{2})
  - Water: 0 sq mi (0.00 km^{2})
- Elevation: 906 ft (276 m)

Population (2020)
  - Total: 869
  - Density: 1,111.3/sq mi (429.07/km^{2})
- Time zone: UTC-6 (Central (CST))
  - Summer (DST): UTC-5 (CDT)
- ZIP code: 73456
- Area code: 580
- FIPS code: 40-63350
- GNIS feature ID: 2412552

Ringling is a town in Jefferson County, Oklahoma, United States. Its population was 869 as of the 2020 United States census. It was named for John Ringling, the founder of the Ringling Brothers Circus.

== History ==
John Ringling and a partner, Jake Hamon, financed construction of the Oklahoma, New Mexico and Pacific Railway in 1913, with the intent to provide transportation to farmers and ranchers between Ardmore and Lawton. Construction began on May 1, 1913, at Ardmore and progressed westward. The railroad built about 20 miles of road through Lone Grove to what would become the town of Wilson in 1913, and in 1914 built a further 10 miles of road west from Wilson. However, due to the August 1913 discovery of oil in the Healdton field, being the very area through which the railroad was building, westbound construction on the line was stopped in January 1914 at a location in eastern Jefferson County about one mile north of the existing town of Cornish. This location became the boom town of Ringling, fed both by the petroleum industry and by Cornish citizens and business leaders moving to Ringling to be near the railroad. A post office was established during June 1914.

Historical population
Census	Pop.	Note	%±
1920	1,039		—
1930	1,002		−3.6%
1940	902		−10.0%
1950	1,092		21.1%
1960	1,170		7.1%
1970	1,206		3.1%
1980	1,561		29.4%
1990	1,250		−19.9%
2000	1,135		−9.2%
2010	1,037		−8.6%
2020	869		−16.2%

== Geography ==
Ringling is located in eastern Jefferson County and is bordered to the south by the town of Cornish.

U.S. Route 70 passes through the southern part of Ringling, leading 23 miles (37 km) west to Waurika, the Jefferson county seat, and 25 miles (40 km) east to Ardmore. Oklahoma State Highway 89 (Fifth Street) runs north–south through the center of Ringling.

According to the United States Census Bureau, the town has a total area of 0.66 square miles (1.7 km^{2}), consisting purely of land.

== Demographics ==
=== 2020 census ===
As of the 2020 census, Ringling had a population of 869. The median age was 39.5 years. 26.0% of residents were under the age of 18 and 19.2% of residents were 65 years of age or older. For every 100 females there were 91.0 males, and for every 100 females age 18 and over there were 86.4 males age 18 and over.

0.0% of residents lived in urban areas, while 100.0% lived in rural areas.

There were 347 households in Ringling, of which 29.7% had children under the age of 18 living in them. Of all households, 42.1% were married-couple households, 17.9% were households with a male householder and no spouse or partner present, and 32.3% were households with a female householder and no spouse or partner present. About 32.0% of all households were made up of individuals and 18.1% had someone living alone who was 65 years of age or older.

There were 418 housing units, of which 17.0% were vacant. The homeowner vacancy rate was 1.7% and the rental vacancy rate was 9.7%.

Racial composition as of the 2020 census
Race	Number	Percent
White	676	77.8%
Black or African American	1	0.1%
American Indian and Alaska Native	54	6.2%
Asian	6	0.7%
Native Hawaiian and Other Pacific Islander	0	0.0%
Some other race	19	2.2%
Two or more races	113	13.0%
Hispanic or Latino (of any race)	45	5.2%

=== 2000 census ===
As of the 2000 census, there were 1,135 people, 469 households, and 297 families residing in the town. The population density was 1,481.2 inhabitants per square mile (571.9/km^{2}). There were 567 housing units at an average density of 739.9 per square mile (285.7/km^{2}). The racial makeup of the town was 87.40% White, 8.28% Native American, 0.35% Asian, 0.79% from other races, and 3.17% from two or more races. Hispanic or Latino of any race were 1.67% of the population.

There were 469 households, out of which 29.4% had children under the age of 18 living with them, 49.3% were married couples living together, 10.0% had a female householder with no husband present, and 36.5% were non-families. 34.5% of all households were made up of individuals, and 19.4% had someone living alone who was 65 years of age or older. The average household size was 2.33 and the average family size was 2.99.

In the town, the population was spread out, with 25.6% under the age of 18, 7.3% from 18 to 24, 24.1% from 25 to 44, 21.3% from 45 to 64, and 21.7% who were 65 years of age or older. The median age was 38 years. For every 100 females, there were 86.4 males. For every 100 females age 18 and over, there were 83.9 males.

As of 2000, the median income for a household in the town was $19,674, and the median income for a family was $29,219. Males had a median income of $28,333 versus $14,063 for females. The per capita income for the town was $13,003. About 18.8% of families and 24.0% of the population were below the poverty line, including 29.5% of those under age 18 and 17.2% of those age 65 or over.
