= Wilson, Oklahoma =

Town in Oklahoma, United States

- Town
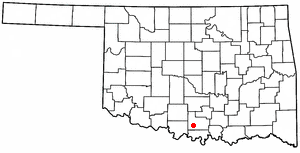
- Location of Wilson, Oklahoma
- Coordinates: 34°10′06″N 97°25′33″W
- Country: United States
- State: Oklahoma
- County: Carter

Area
  - Total: 5.66 sq mi (14.65 km^{2})
  - Land: 5.64 sq mi (14.62 km^{2})
  - Water: 0.012 sq mi (0.03 km^{2})
- Elevation: 909 ft (277 m)

Population (2020)
  - Total: 1,399
  - Density: 247.9/sq mi (95.71/km^{2})
- Time zone: UTC-6 (Central (CST))
  - Summer (DST): UTC-5 (CDT)
- ZIP code: 73463
- Area code: 580
- FIPS code: 40-81500
- GNIS feature ID: 2412275

Wilson is a town in Carter County, Oklahoma, United States. As of the 2020 census, the community had 1,399 residents. It is about 17 miles west of Ardmore off US Route 70, and is part of the Ardmore, Oklahoma Micropolitan Statistical Area. It is home to one of the oldest Assemblies of God churches in Oklahoma, the Wilson Assembly of God Church.

== History ==
John Ringling (of Ringling Brothers fame) in 1913 built his Oklahoma, New Mexico and Pacific Railway west from Ardmore to the spot that would become Wilson. Ringling himself chose the name—originally “New Wilson”--- as a tribute to Charles Wilson, manager of the Ringling Brothers Circus. A post office was established on January 17, 1914; the town voted to incorporate the same year; and, the name changed to Wilson in 1918.

The murder of Jared Lakey in 2019 achieved national attention.

== Geography ==
Wilson is located in southwestern Carter County. U.S. Highway 70 passes through the city north of the populated center; it leads east 16 miles (26 km) to Ardmore, the Carter County seat, and west 35 miles (56 km) to Waurika.

According to the United States Census Bureau, Wilson has a total area of 5.7 square miles (14.7 km^{2}), of which 0.01 square miles (0.03 km^{2}), or 0.23%, is water.

== Demographics ==
Historical population
Census	Pop.	Note	%±
1920	2,286		—
1930	2,517		10.1%
1940	1,700		−32.5%
1950	1,832		7.8%
1960	1,647		−10.1%
1970	1,569		−4.7%
1980	1,585		1.0%
1990	1,639		3.4%
2000	1,584		−3.4%
2010	1,724		8.8%
2020	1,399		−18.9%
U.S. Decennial Census

=== 2020 census ===
As of the 2020 census, Wilson had a population of 1,399. The median age was 43.0 years. 23.7% of residents were under the age of 18 and 20.1% of residents were 65 years of age or older. For every 100 females there were 94.0 males, and for every 100 females age 18 and over there were 86.4 males age 18 and over.

0% of residents lived in urban areas, while 100.0% lived in rural areas.

There were 581 households in Wilson, of which 34.6% had children under the age of 18 living in them. Of all households, 41.1% were married-couple households, 18.2% were households with a male householder and no spouse or partner present, and 31.7% were households with a female householder and no spouse or partner present. About 28.0% of all households were made up of individuals and 12.0% had someone living alone who was 65 years of age or older.

There were 653 housing units, of which 11.0% were vacant. Among occupied housing units, 70.1% were owner-occupied and 29.9% were renter-occupied. The homeowner vacancy rate was 4.1% and the rental vacancy rate was 3.3%.

Racial composition as of the 2020 census
Race	Percent
White	80.5%
Black or African American	0.3%
American Indian and Alaska Native	8.6%
Asian	0%
Native Hawaiian and Other Pacific Islander	0%
Some other race	0.5%
Two or more races	10.1%
Hispanic or Latino (of any race)	2.7%

=== 2000 census ===
As of the census of 2000, there were 1,584 people, 625 households, and 426 families residing in the city. The population density was 278.3 inhabitants per square mile (107.5/km^{2}). There were 785 housing units at an average density of 137.9 per square mile (53.2/km^{2}). The racial makeup of the city was 89.71% White, 0.25% African American, 6.57% Native American, 0.44% Asian, 0.44% from other races, and 2.59% from two or more races. Hispanic or Latino of any race were 1.83% of the population.

There were 625 households, out of which 31.4% had children under the age of 18 living with them, 52.2% were married couples living together, 11.4% had a female householder with no husband present, and 31.8% were non-families. 29.9% of all households were made up of individuals, and 17.9% had someone living alone who was 65 years of age or older. The average household size was 2.45 and the average family size was 3.03.

In the city, the population was spread out, with 26.5% under the age of 18, 7.8% from 18 to 24, 23.9% from 25 to 44, 21.5% from 45 to 64, and 20.2% who were 65 years of age or older. The median age was 38 years. For every 100 females, there were 89.0 males. For every 100 females age 18 and over, there were 84.5 males.

The median income for a household in the city was $22,667, and the median income for a family was $28,199. Males had a median income of $29,063 versus $17,619 for females. The per capita income for the city was $11,258. About 15.4% of families and 20.8% of the population were below the poverty line, including 27.0% of those under age 18 and 18.3% of those age 65 or over.

== Historic Landmark ==
The Healdton Oil Field Bunkhouse, just north of Wilson, is NRHP-listed.
