= Ryan, Oklahoma =

- Town
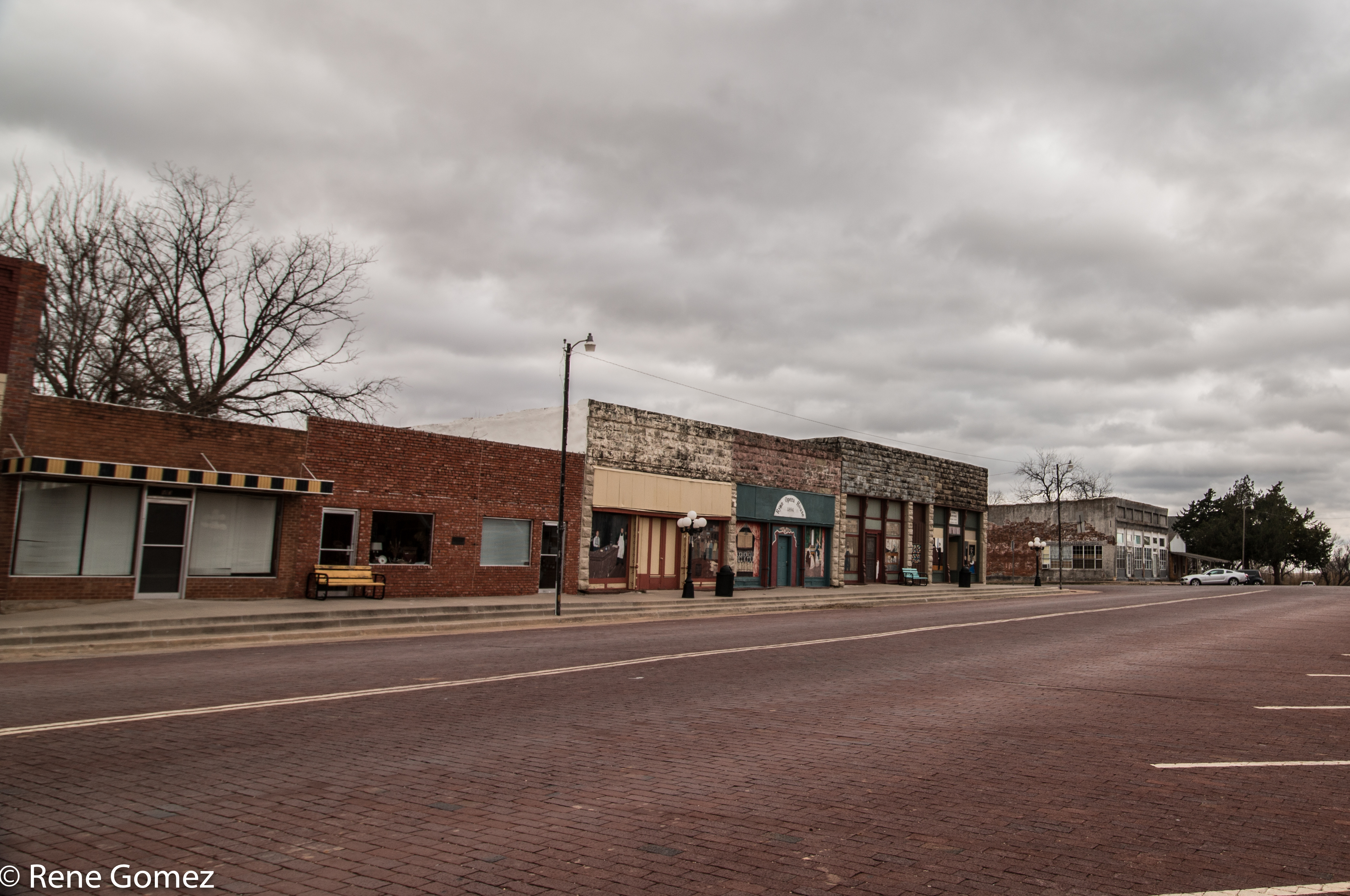

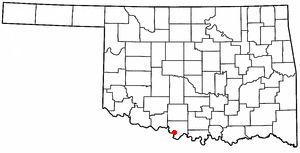
- Location of Ryan, Oklahoma
- Coordinates: 34°01′17″N 97°57′15″W
- Country: United States
- State: Oklahoma
- County: Jefferson
- Established: 1890

Government
  - Type: Town Council

Area
  - Total: 0.95 sq mi (2.47 km^{2})
  - Land: 0.95 sq mi (2.47 km^{2})
  - Water: 0 sq mi (0.00 km^{2})
- Elevation: 902 ft (275 m)

Population (2020)
  - Total: 667
  - Density: 700.4/sq mi (270.44/km^{2})
- Time zone: UTC-6 (Central (CST))
  - Summer (DST): UTC-5 (CDT)
- ZIP code: 73565
- Area code: 580
- FIPS code: 40-64600
- GNIS feature ID: 2412587

Ryan is a town in Jefferson County, Oklahoma, United States, located just north of the Texas state line. The population was 667 at the 2020 census. It is also known as the birthplace of Chuck Norris.

== Geography ==
Ryan is 2 miles (3.2 km) north of the Red River, 11 miles (18 km) south of Waurika and 115 miles (185 km) south-southwest of Oklahoma City.

According to the United States Census Bureau, the town has a total area of 0.9 square miles (2.3 km^{2}), all land.

== History ==
The incorporated community of Ryan is located in southwestern Jefferson County. It is situated some two miles (3.2 km) north of the Red River at the intersection of U.S. Highway 81 and State Highway 32, eleven miles (18 km) south of Waurika and 115 miles (185 km) south by southwest of Oklahoma City. It was named in honor of rancher Stephen W. Ryan, an Arkansas native who settled near present-day Ryan in 1875.

As a result of his marriage to a Chickasaw woman, Ryan acquired vast acreage in present Jefferson County, then a part of Pickens County, Chickasaw Nation, Indian Territory. When the Chicago, Rock Island and Pacific Railway constructed a station on Ryan's land in 1892, he platted the site for the town that now bears his name. A post office had been established in that locality in June 1890, and Ryan's home, built circa 1877, was the community's first residence.

Ryan was named the seat of Jefferson County by delegates to the 1906 Constitutional Convention. It lost that title in February 1912, when county voters chose Waurika to be the county seat. Ryan developed as an agricultural and ranching community. Local ranchers raised cattle and hogs, and farmers produced cotton, corn, and wheat. The fruit industry was a prosperous enterprise, as pears, peaches, apples, plums, and strawberries were grown in abundance.

Fire nearly destroyed Ryan in December 1895, but the residents rebuilt. Ryan had 1,115 residents in 1907. By 1908, it had thirty businesses, including two banks, a hotel, a cotton gin, two lumberyards, a flour mill, and a cottonseed oil mill. By 1930 the townspeople enjoyed one-mile (1.6 km) of paved roads, two schools, three hundred telephone connections, and a bus line. The town's population peaked at 1,379 in 1920 and then declined. The 1940 and 1950 censuses reported 1,115 and 1,019, respectively. Numbers dropped to 978 in 1960. By 1980 the town had 1,083 residents, declining to 894 in 2000.

At the start of the twenty-first century, Ryan had four Protestant churches and one Catholic church. Two primary and secondary schools were available to the public. The Ryan public schools and the Ryan Nursing Home were the town's major employers. The Ryan Nursing home, however, closed in 2011. The weekly Ryan Leader, the community's lone newspaper in 2003, which began as the Ryan Record in 1894, has since closed.

== Demographics ==
Historical population
Census	Pop.	Note	%±
1910	1,207		—
1920	1,379		14.3%
1930	1,258		−8.8%
1940	1,115		−11.4%
1950	1,019		−8.6%
1960	978		−4.0%
1970	1,011		3.4%
1980	1,083		7.1%
1990	945		−12.7%
2000	894		−5.4%
2010	816		−8.7%
2020	667		−18.3%
U.S. Decennial Census

=== 2020 census ===
As of the 2020 census, Ryan had a population of 667. The median age was 37.7 years. 28.8% of residents were under the age of 18 and 20.7% of residents were 65 years of age or older. For every 100 females there were 91.7 males, and for every 100 females age 18 and over there were 90.0 males age 18 and over.

0.0% of residents lived in urban areas, while 100.0% lived in rural areas.

There were 270 households in Ryan, of which 31.1% had children under the age of 18 living in them. Of all households, 42.6% were married-couple households, 20.7% were households with a male householder and no spouse or partner present, and 31.1% were households with a female householder and no spouse or partner present. About 31.9% of all households were made up of individuals and 13.7% had someone living alone who was 65 years of age or older.

There were 357 housing units, of which 24.4% were vacant. The homeowner vacancy rate was 6.2% and the rental vacancy rate was 11.9%.

Racial composition as of the 2020 census
Race	Number	Percent
White	528	79.2%
Black or African American	1	0.1%
American Indian and Alaska Native	30	4.5%
Asian	0	0.0%
Native Hawaiian and Other Pacific Islander	0	0.0%
Some other race	47	7.0%
Two or more races	61	9.1%
Hispanic or Latino (of any race)	137	20.5%

=== 2000 census ===
As of the census of 2000, there were 894 people, 358 households, and 233 families residing in the town. The population density was 987.5 inhabitants per square mile (381.3/km^{2}). There were 439 housing units at an average density of 484.9 per square mile (187.2/km^{2}). The racial makeup of the town was 87.47% White, 0.67% African American, 3.24% Native American, 0.22% Asian, 0.00% Pacific Islander, 6.82% from other races, and 1.57% from two or more races. 12.30% of the population were Hispanic or Latino of any race.

There were 358 households, out of which 31.0% had children under the age of 18 living with them, 50.6% were married couples living together, 10.6% had a female householder with no husband present, and 34.9% were non-families. 31.0% of all households were made up of individuals, and 17.3% had someone living alone who was 65 years of age or older. The average household size was 2.35 and the average family size was 2.97.

In the town the population was spread out, with 24.7% under the age of 18, 6.9% from 18 to 24, 24.0% from 25 to 44, 21.4% from 45 to 64, and 22.9% who were 65 years of age or older. The median age was 42 years. For every 100 females, there were 83.6 males. For every 100 females age 18 and over, there were 78.5 males.

The median income for a household in the town was $20,855, and the median income for a family was $26,167. Males had a median income of $22,813 versus $15,000 for females. The per capita income for the town was $11,057. About 26.7% of families and 25.4% of the population were below the poverty line, including 32.3% of those under age 18 and 12.9% of those age 65 or over.

== Education ==
Ryan Public Schools operates public schools in Ryan. Ryan Elementary and Ryan High Schools are the only schools located in the town.

== Notable people ==
- Chuck Norris (1940-2026), martial artist and actor
- Abe Lemons (1922-2002), college basketball coach
- Floyd Tillman (1914-2003), singer in Country Music Hall of Fame
