= Jefferson County, Oklahoma =

County in Oklahoma, United States

- County
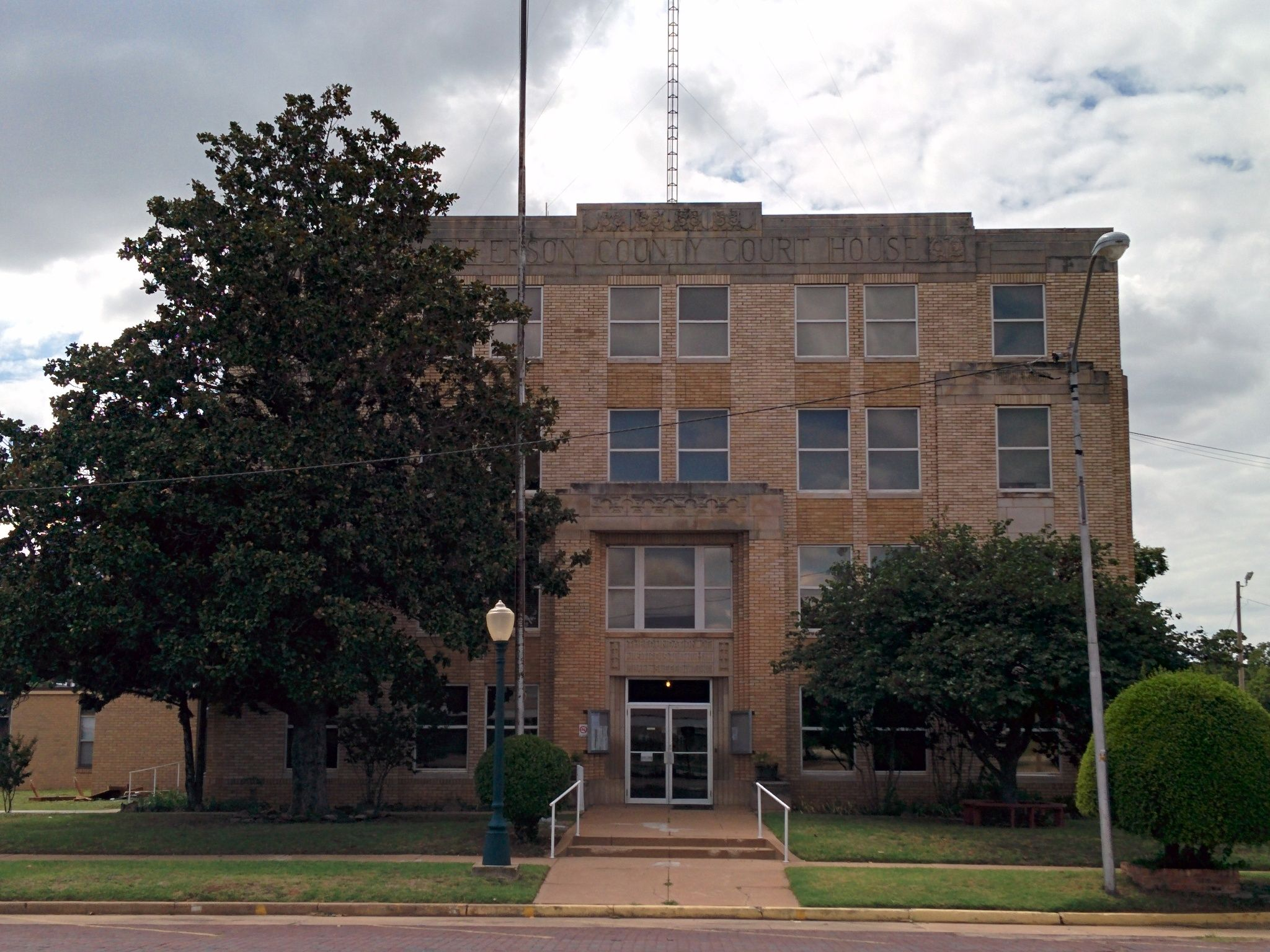
- Jefferson County Courthouse in Waurika (2014)

- Location within the U.S. state of Oklahoma
- Coordinates: 34°06′N 97°50′W
- Country: United States
- State: Oklahoma
- Founded: 1907
- Named for: Thomas Jefferson
- Seat: Waurika
- Largest city: Waurika

Area
  - Total: 774 sq mi (2,000 km^{2})
  - Land: 759 sq mi (1,970 km^{2})
  - Water: 15 sq mi (39 km^{2}) 2.0%

Population (2020)
  - Total: 5,337
  - Estimate (2025): 5,431 ▲
  - Density: 6.9/sq mi (2.7/km^{2})
- Time zone: UTC−6 (Central)
  - Summer (DST): UTC−5 (CDT)
- Congressional district: 4th

Jefferson County is a county located in the U.S. state of Oklahoma. As of the 2020 census, the population was 5,337. Its county seat is Waurika. The county was created at statehood and named in honor of President Thomas Jefferson.

== History ==
In the 1750s, the Taovaya Indians, a Wichita tribe, established twin villages along the Red River, in Jefferson County and across the river near present-day Spanish Fort, Texas. The village became "a lively emporium where Comanches brought Apache slaves, horses and mules to trade for French packs of powder, balls, knives, and textiles and for Taovaya-grown maize, melons, pumpkins, squash, and tobacco."

In 1759, in response to the destruction of the San Saba Mission, the Spanish led an expedition against the Taovaya and their allies and attacked the twin villages. The Indians defeated the Spanish army. (See Battle of the Twin Villages) The Taovaya villages were abandoned before 1841 as the Taovaya had been decimated by smallpox and encroachment by other Indians and Anglo-Americans.

In the 1830s, the Choctaw tribe acquired more than two-thirds of the land now covered by Jefferson County, and the closely related Chickasaw tribe began to relocate there. In 1855, the two tribes formally divided and this area became part of the Chickasaw Nation. The western part of the present county became part of the Kiowa-Comanche-Apache Reservation, created by the 1867 Medicine Lodge Treaty. That area was opened to settlement by non-Indians by the Kiowa-Comanche-Apache Opening in 1901.

After the Civil War, the Chisholm Trail, which passed through this area, was heavily used to drive cattle from Texas to markets in Kansas. In 1892, the Chicago, Rock Island and Pacific Railway laid tracks along the trail route. The Enid and Anadarko Railway, sold to the Rock Island in 1903, built a line from Lawton to Waurika. The Wichita Falls and Oklahoma Railroad built the last railroad in the county in 1923, from Texas to Waurika. It went out of business in 1942. A railway line was built from Ardmore to Ringling.

Until statehood, the territory of the present-day county was part of Pickens County, Chickasaw Nation.

Statehood in 1907 brought about the demise of the Chickasaw government and creation of Jefferson County. At that time the southeast corner of the county extended to Mud Creek including the communities of Belleville and Courtney. In 1924 the southeast corner of the county was realigned to its current boundary. The Oklahoma Constitutional Convention named Ryan as the county seat. An election for the seat was held in 1908 between Ryan, Sugden and Waurika, but none of the towns won a majority. Another election was held in 1912, resulting in Waurika being named as the county seat.

== Geography ==
According to the U.S. Census Bureau, the county has a total area of 774 square miles (2,000 km^{2}), of which 759 square miles (1,970 km^{2}) is land and 15 square miles (39 km^{2}) (2.0%) is water. The county drains into the Red River via Beaver and Mud creeks. Waurika Lake was created in 1971 by damming Beaver Creek in northwestern Jefferson County.

=== Major highways ===
- U.S. Highway 70
- U.S. Highway 81
- State Highway 5
- State Highway 32
- State Highway 79
- State Highway 89

=== Adjacent counties ===
- Stephens County (north)
- Carter County (northeast)
- Love County (east)
- Montague County, Texas (south)
- Clay County, Texas (southwest)
- Cotton County (west)

== Demographics ==
Historical population
Census	Pop.	Note	%±
1910	17,430		—
1920	17,664		1.3%
1930	17,392		−1.5%
1940	15,107		−13.1%
1950	11,122		−26.4%
1960	8,192		−26.3%
1970	7,125		−13.0%
1980	8,183		14.8%
1990	7,010		−14.3%
2000	6,818		−2.7%
2010	6,472		−5.1%
2020	5,337		−17.5%
2025 (est.)	5,431	▲	1.8%
U.S. Decennial Census; 1790-1960 1900-1990; 1990-2000 2010-2019

=== 2020 census ===
As of the 2020 United States census, the county had a population of 5,337. Of the residents, 24.0% were under the age of 18 and 22.0% were 65 years of age or older; the median age was 42.4 years. For every 100 females there were 93.9 males, and for every 100 females age 18 and over there were 93.3 males.

The racial makeup of the county was 78.8% White, 0.5% Black or African American, 5.4% American Indian and Alaska Native, 0.6% Asian, 4.6% from some other race, and 10.1% from two or more races. Hispanic or Latino residents of any race comprised 10.9% of the population.

There were 2,168 households in the county, of which 31.2% had children under the age of 18 living with them and 28.0% had a female householder with no spouse or partner present. About 28.7% of all households were made up of individuals and 14.7% had someone living alone who was 65 years of age or older.

There were 2,728 housing units, of which 20.5% were vacant. Among occupied housing units, 71.1% were owner-occupied and 28.9% were renter-occupied. The homeowner vacancy rate was 2.9% and the rental vacancy rate was 13.4%.

=== 2000 census ===
At the 2000 census there were 6,818 people, 2,716 households, and 1,863 families in the county. The population density was 9 people per square mile (3.5 people/km^{2}). There were 3,373 housing units at an average density of 4 units per square mile (1.5/km^{2}). The racial makeup of the county was 87.14% White, 0.69% Black or African American, 5.24% Native American, 1.13% Asian, 0.03% Pacific Islander, 2.86% from other races, and 2.92% from two or more races. 7.01%. were Hispanic or Latino of any race.

Of the 2,716 households 29.20% had children under the age of 18 living with them, 55.60% were married couples living together, 9.20% had a female householder with no husband present, and 31.40% were non-families. 28.80% of households were one person and 15.40% were one person aged 65 or older. The average household size was 2.38 and the average family size was 2.92.

The age distribution was 24.00% under the age of 18, 7.20% from 18 to 24, 25.40% from 25 to 44, 23.30% from 45 to 64, and 20.10% 65 or older. The median age was 40 years. For every 100 females there were 94.70 males. For every 100 females age 18 and over, there were 93.80 males.

The median household income was $23,674 and the median family income was $30,563. Males had a median income of $25,195 versus $16,589 for females. The per capita income for the county was $12,899. About 16.30% of families and 19.20% of the population were below the poverty line, including 23.30% of those under age 18 and 18.40% of those age 65 or over.

== Politics ==
Despite Democrats leading in voter registration as recently as the late 2010s, Jefferson County has almost exclusively supported Republican candidates in almost every election of the 21st century. The last Democrat to carry the county at the presidential level was Bill Clinton of neighboring Arkansas in 1996, and the GOP vote share has only grown since, with Donald Trump winning nearly 85% of the county's vote in 2020, the best Republican performance in history.

Voter Registration and Party Enrollment as of June 30, 2023
Party	Number of Voters	Percentage
Democratic	997	29.10%
Republican	1,910	55.75%
Unaffiliated	519	15.19%
Total	3,426	100%

United States presidential election results for Jefferson County, Oklahoma
Year	Republican		Democratic		Third party(ies)	
Year	No.	%	No.	%	No.	%
1908	604	26.06%	1,435	61.91%	279	12.04%
1912	361	16.74%	1,118	51.83%	678	31.43%
1916	493	17.23%	1,739	60.76%	630	22.01%
1920	1,733	39.36%	2,289	51.99%	381	8.65%
1924	1,108	29.44%	2,441	64.87%	214	5.69%
1928	2,251	53.79%	1,916	45.78%	18	0.43%
1932	485	11.97%	3,566	88.03%	0	0.00%
1936	1,032	21.62%	3,719	77.92%	22	0.46%
1940	1,226	24.23%	3,814	75.38%	20	0.40%
1944	974	24.74%	2,948	74.88%	15	0.38%
1948	556	14.32%	3,326	85.68%	0	0.00%
1952	1,384	32.52%	2,872	67.48%	0	0.00%
1956	1,186	31.84%	2,539	68.16%	0	0.00%
1960	1,343	40.85%	1,945	59.15%	0	0.00%
1964	811	24.09%	2,555	75.91%	0	0.00%
1968	780	25.09%	1,628	52.36%	701	22.55%
1972	1,709	62.12%	969	35.22%	73	2.65%
1976	956	29.10%	2,303	70.11%	26	0.79%
1980	1,440	43.22%	1,812	54.38%	80	2.40%
1984	1,656	52.09%	1,496	47.06%	27	0.85%
1988	1,063	37.35%	1,767	62.09%	16	0.56%
1992	671	22.23%	1,580	52.34%	768	25.44%
1996	865	32.69%	1,430	54.04%	351	13.27%
2000	1,320	50.91%	1,245	48.01%	28	1.08%
2004	1,546	59.39%	1,057	40.61%	0	0.00%
2008	1,652	67.24%	805	32.76%	0	0.00%
2012	1,634	72.98%	605	27.02%	0	0.00%
2016	1,910	81.28%	365	15.53%	75	3.19%
2020	2,026	84.95%	319	13.38%	40	1.68%
2024	2,020	85.05%	319	13.43%	36	1.52%

== Communities ==
=== City ===
- Waurika (county seat)

=== Towns ===
- Addington
- Cornish
- Hastings
- Ringling
- Ryan
- Sugden
- Terral

=== Unincorporated communities ===
- Atlee
- Fleetwood
- Grady
- Oscar

== See also ==
- National Register of Historic Places listings in Jefferson County, Oklahoma
