= Wichita Falls and Oklahoma Railway =

Overview
- Headquarters: Wichita Falls, Texas
- Locale: Texas and Oklahoma
- Dates of operation: 1903–1942

Technical
- Track gauge: 4 ft 8 1/2 in (1,435 mm)
- Length: 27.5 mi (44.3 km)

The Wichita Falls and Oklahoma Railway, together with its affiliate the Wichita Falls and Oklahoma Railroad of Oklahoma, built a line from Wichita Falls, Texas to Waurika, Oklahoma in two stages, starting in 1903 and completing in 1923. Results were disappointing, and the line was abandoned in late 1942.

== History ==
The Wichita Falls and Oklahoma Railway Company (WF&OR) was incorporated October 23, 1903, with its headquarters at Wichita Falls. Its mission was to build a twenty-mile railway from Wichita Falls to the Oklahoma border, and specifically to a point in the northwest corner of Clay County, Texas on the south bank of the Red River near Byers, Texas. That line was placed in service on June 24, 1904. The line was leased to and operated by the Wichita Valley Railway (WVR). The trackage was the first of a number of feeder lines that the WVR’s direct parent, the Colorado and Southern Railway, established for the Fort Worth and Denver City Railway, which was prohibited by its own charter from building branch lines. The WVR’s ultimate parent by 1908 was the Chicago, Burlington and Quincy Railroad.

In 1922 the WF&OR was looking to expand, and in June of that year had its affiliate, the Wichita Falls and Oklahoma Railroad of Oklahoma, start building a continuation from the Red River across Oklahoma to a connection with the Chicago, Rock Island and Pacific Railroad at Waurika, about seven and a half miles. That portion was placed in operation in March, 1923, and the whole length was operated by the WVR. Another railway, the Wichita Falls and Southern Railroad, which connected to Wichita Falls from the south, was given trackage rights over the entire line.

However, results were disappointing. All of the line was abandoned October 19, 1942. The following year, the tracks were removed.
