= 1984 United States presidential election in Oklahoma =

- November 6, 1984

Nominee	Ronald Reagan	Walter Mondale
Party	Republican	Democratic
Home state	California	Minnesota
Running mate	George H. W. Bush	Geraldine Ferraro
Electoral vote	8	0
Popular vote	861,530	385,080
Percentage	68.61%	30.67%
County results
Reagan
50–60%
60–70%
70–80%
80–90%
Mondale
50–60%
President before election
Ronald Reagan
Republican
Elected President
Ronald Reagan
Republican

The 1984 United States presidential election in Oklahoma took place on November 6, 1984. All 50 states and the District of Columbia, were part of the 1984 United States presidential election. Voters chose eight electors to the Electoral College, which selected the president and vice president of the United States.

Oklahoma was won by incumbent United States President Ronald Reagan of California, who was running against former Vice President Walter Mondale of Minnesota. Reagan ran for a second time with former C.I.A. Director George H. W. Bush of Texas, and Mondale ran with Representative Geraldine Ferraro of New York, the first major female candidate for the vice presidency. Reagan won all but three counties, and lost the three he did lose by a combined aggregate of only 381 votes.

Nearly every county in Oklahoma voted in majority for the Republican candidate, a particularly strong turnout even in this typically archconservative state. This trend included Oklahoma City's Oklahoma County. Reagan did best in Texas County, and Mondale did best in Hughes County. The former Democratic stronghold in the Southeastern part of the state is evident in this election as only marginally Republican. Oklahoma weighed in for this election as 10% more Republican than the national average. Reagan's 68.61% of the vote has not been matched in the state since this election.

== Results ==
1984 United States presidential election in Oklahoma
Party	Candidate	Votes	Percentage	Electoral votes
Republican	Ronald Reagan (incumbent)	861,530	68.61%	8
Democratic	Walter Mondale	385,080	30.67%	0
Libertarian	David Bergland	9,066	0.72%	0
Totals		1,255,676	100.0%	8
Voter turnout (Voting age/Registered Voters)		52%/64%		

=== Results by county ===
County	Ronald Reagan Republican		Walter Mondale Democratic		David Bergland Libertarian		Margin		Total votes cast
County	#	%	#	%	#	%	#	%	Total votes cast
Adair	4,423	65.57%	2,266	33.60%	56	0.83%	2,157	31.97%	6,745
Alfalfa	2,715	75.25%	866	24.00%	27	0.75%	1,849	51.25%	3,608
Atoka	2,361	53.13%	2,047	46.06%	36	0.81%	314	7.07%	4,444
Beaver	2,689	82.69%	536	16.48%	27	0.83%	2,153	66.21%	3,252
Beckham	5,005	65.39%	2,601	33.98%	48	0.63%	2,404	31.41%	7,654
Blaine	4,037	72.69%	1,484	26.72%	33	0.59%	2,553	45.97%	5,554
Bryan	6,246	53.07%	5,475	46.52%	48	0.41%	771	6.55%	11,769
Caddo	6,811	60.06%	4,463	39.35%	67	0.59%	2,348	20.71%	11,341
Canadian	20,929	79.52%	5,245	19.93%	146	0.55%	15,684	59.59%	26,320
Carter	11,578	64.96%	6,161	34.57%	83	0.47%	5,417	30.39%	17,822
Cherokee	7,614	58.50%	5,307	40.78%	94	0.72%	2,307	17.72%	13,015
Choctaw	3,155	52.70%	2,801	46.78%	31	0.52%	354	5.92%	5,987
Cimarron	1,420	79.15%	359	20.01%	15	0.84%	1,061	59.14%	1,794
Cleveland	42,806	71.70%	16,512	27.66%	387	0.65%	26,294	44.04%	59,705
Coal	1,259	49.10%	1,284	50.08%	21	0.82%	-25	-0.98%	2,564
Comanche	21,382	70.35%	8,890	29.25%	122	0.40%	12,492	41.10%	30,394
Cotton	1,796	58.31%	1,264	41.04%	20	0.65%	532	17.27%	3,080
Craig	3,629	58.63%	2,515	40.63%	46	0.74%	1,114	18.00%	6,190
Creek	15,011	66.34%	7,465	32.99%	152	0.67%	7,546	33.35%	22,628
Custer	8,191	74.87%	2,700	24.68%	49	0.45%	5,491	50.19%	10,940
Delaware	6,690	63.46%	3,789	35.94%	63	0.60%	2,901	27.52%	10,542
Dewey	2,098	75.55%	664	23.91%	15	0.54%	1,434	51.64%	2,777
Ellis	1,881	76.46%	562	22.85%	17	0.69%	1,319	53.61%	2,460
Garfield	19,642	76.92%	5,730	22.44%	162	0.63%	13,912	54.48%	25,534
Garvin	7,505	63.54%	4,215	35.69%	91	0.77%	3,290	27.85%	11,811
Grady	11,042	69.19%	4,846	30.36%	72	0.45%	6,196	38.83%	15,960
Grant	2,470	74.31%	825	24.82%	29	0.87%	1,645	49.49%	3,324
Greer	1,664	57.36%	1,220	42.05%	17	0.59%	444	15.31%	2,901
Harmon	1,009	55.90%	785	43.49%	11	0.61%	224	12.41%	1,805
Harper	1,748	81.45%	373	17.38%	25	1.16%	1,375	64.07%	2,146
Haskell	2,417	48.52%	2,535	50.89%	29	0.58%	-118	-2.37%	4,981
Hughes	2,663	47.57%	2,901	51.82%	34	0.61%	-238	-4.25%	5,598
Jackson	5,773	65.64%	2,996	34.06%	26	0.30%	2,777	31.58%	8,795
Jefferson	1,656	52.09%	1,496	47.06%	27	0.85%	160	5.03%	3,179
Johnston	2,195	54.36%	1,820	45.07%	23	0.57%	375	9.29%	4,038
Kay	16,731	73.03%	6,044	26.38%	136	0.59%	10,687	46.65%	22,911
Kingfisher	5,528	82.68%	1,125	16.83%	33	0.49%	4,403	65.85%	6,686
Kiowa	2,951	59.08%	2,016	40.36%	28	0.56%	935	18.72%	4,995
Latimer	2,210	53.90%	1,858	45.32%	32	0.78%	352	8.58%	4,100
LeFlore	8,604	58.54%	5,990	40.75%	104	0.71%	2,614	17.79%	14,698
Lincoln	8,088	72.29%	3,020	26.99%	81	0.72%	5,068	45.30%	11,189
Logan	8,356	69.76%	3,551	29.65%	71	0.59%	4,805	40.11%	11,978
Love	1,833	57.12%	1,359	42.35%	17	0.53%	474	14.77%	3,209
McClain	6,056	69.83%	2,549	29.39%	67	0.77%	3,507	40.44%	8,672
McCurtain	6,381	61.26%	3,994	38.34%	41	0.39%	2,387	22.92%	10,416
McIntosh	3,646	50.89%	3,479	48.56%	40	0.56%	167	2.33%	7,165
Major	3,385	83.89%	619	15.34%	31	0.77%	2,766	68.55%	4,035
Marshall	2,488	54.56%	2,039	44.71%	33	0.72%	449	9.85%	4,560
Mayes	8,585	62.04%	5,154	37.25%	99	0.72%	3,431	24.79%	13,838
Murray	3,073	57.47%	2,229	41.69%	45	0.84%	844	15.78%	5,347
Muskogee	14,652	53.90%	12,343	45.41%	188	0.69%	2,309	8.49%	27,183
Noble	4,018	76.11%	1,238	23.45%	23	0.44%	2,780	52.66%	5,279
Nowata	3,030	63.64%	1,687	35.43%	44	0.92%	1,343	28.21%	4,761
Okfuskee	2,443	58.94%	1,684	40.63%	18	0.43%	759	18.31%	4,145
Oklahoma	159,974	71.65%	60,235	26.98%	3,052	1.37%	99,739	44.67%	223,261
Okmulgee	8,704	53.76%	7,380	45.59%	105	0.65%	1,324	8.17%	16,189
Osage	10,083	62.02%	6,095	37.49%	79	0.49%	3,988	24.53%	16,257
Ottawa	7,666	56.76%	5,781	42.81%	58	0.43%	1,885	13.95%	13,505
Pawnee	4,699	67.83%	2,165	31.25%	64	0.92%	2,534	36.58%	6,928
Payne	20,811	72.64%	7,653	26.71%	184	0.64%	13,158	45.93%	28,648
Pittsburg	9,778	58.34%	6,860	40.93%	122	0.73%	2,918	17.41%	16,760
Pontotoc	8,301	59.69%	5,526	39.74%	80	0.58%	2,775	19.95%	13,907
Pottawatomie	16,143	69.40%	6,966	29.95%	152	0.65%	9,177	39.45%	23,261
Pushmataha	2,499	54.16%	2,079	45.06%	36	0.78%	420	9.10%	4,614
Roger Mills	1,550	69.10%	680	30.32%	13	0.58%	870	38.78%	2,243
Rogers	16,137	72.40%	6,013	26.98%	138	0.62%	10,124	45.42%	22,288
Seminole	6,009	59.91%	3,957	39.45%	64	0.64%	2,052	20.46%	10,030
Sequoyah	7,042	62.32%	4,202	37.19%	56	0.50%	2,840	25.13%	11,300
Stephens	12,871	66.58%	6,359	32.89%	103	0.53%	6,512	33.69%	19,333
Texas	5,968	84.78%	1,033	14.68%	38	0.54%	4,935	70.10%	7,039
Tillman	2,637	60.96%	1,674	38.70%	15	0.35%	963	22.26%	4,326
Tulsa	159,549	72.90%	58,274	26.62%	1,049	0.48%	101,275	46.28%	218,872
Wagoner	12,534	69.97%	5,271	29.43%	108	0.60%	7,263	40.54%	17,913
Washington	19,043	77.20%	5,476	22.20%	148	0.60%	13,567	55.00%	24,667
Washita	3,847	70.85%	1,547	28.49%	36	0.66%	2,300	42.36%	5,430
Woods	3,741	74.55%	1,231	24.53%	46	0.92%	2,510	50.02%	5,018
Woodward	6,376	79.08%	1,647	20.43%	40	0.50%	4,729	58.65%	8,063
Totals	861,530	68.61%	385,080	30.67%	9,066	0.72%	476,450	37.94%	1,255,676

==== Counties that flipped from Democratic to Republican ====
- Atoka
- Bryan
- Johnston
- McIntosh
- Marshall
- Muskogee
- Okmulgee
- Harmon
- Jefferson
- Love
- Pushmataha
- Choctaw
- McCurtain
- Okfuskee
- Latimer
- Pittsburg

== Slates of Electors ==
Democrat: Carl Albert, Margaret Watson, Dorris Nash, Doris Montgomery, James W. Brown, Edna Mae Phelps, Ed Edmondson, Robert M. Kerr

Republican: Carolyn Branham, Joe Coleman, Ricky Farmer, Larry Lahman, Stuart Meltzer, Luke Reid, Maria Mendez, Mary Helen Swanson

Libertarian: Loren L. Baker, Constance F. Hill, Clare A. Mendus, Thomas J. Laurent III, Andrea Bross, Brian Holk, Monte L. Fruits, Brenda Bromiley

== See also ==
- United States presidential elections in Oklahoma
- Presidency of Ronald Reagan
