= First Presbyterian Church (Waurika, Oklahoma) =

Historic church in Oklahoma, United States

- U.S. National Register of Historic Places
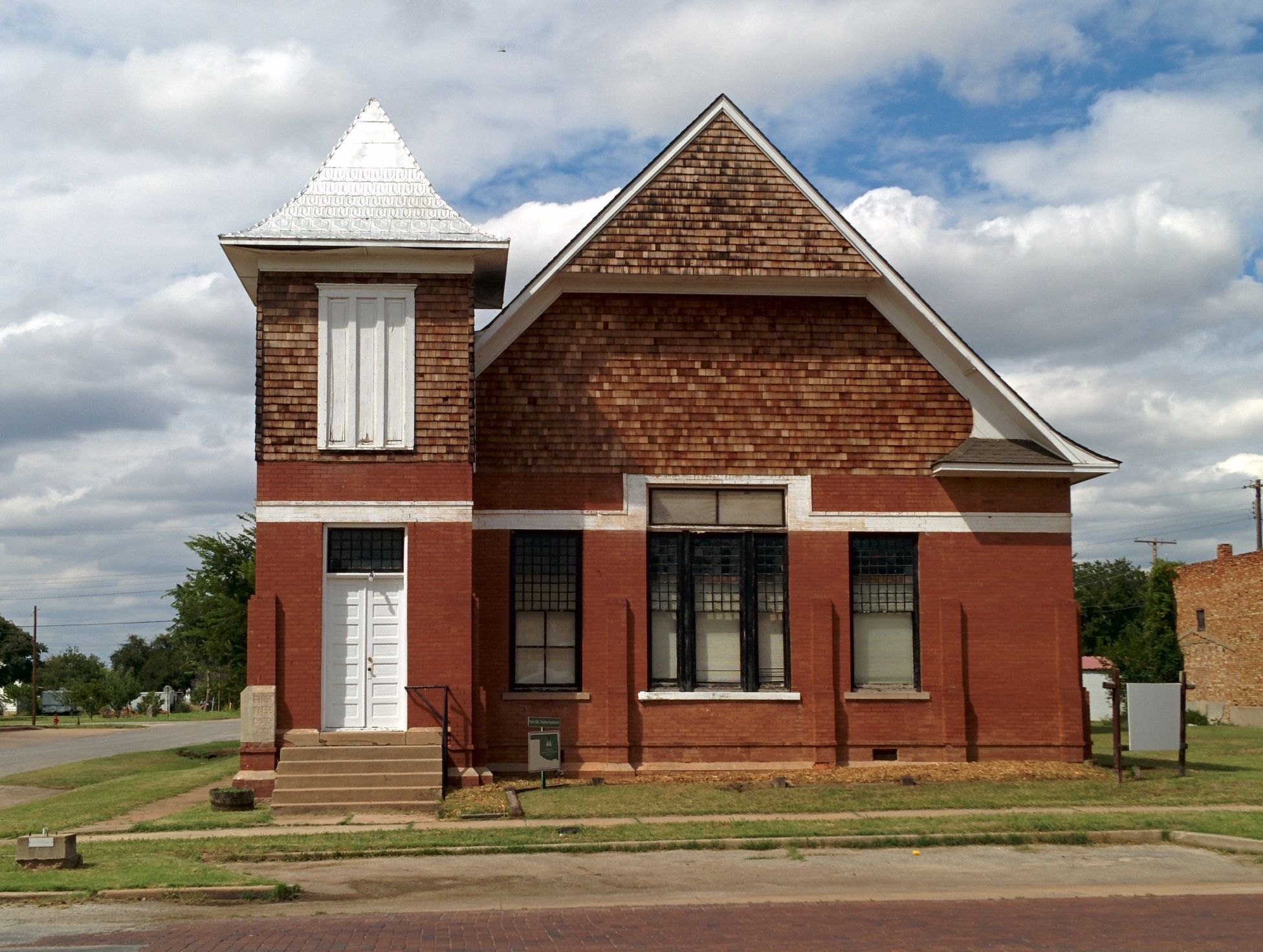

- Location within Oklahoma Location within the United States
- Location: 124 West Broadway, Waurika, Oklahoma
- Coordinates: 34°9′54″N 98°0′7″W
- Area: less than one acre
- Built: 1908
- Built by: J.B. Osborn
- Architect: J.C. Berry
- Architectural style: Side-tower church
- NRHP reference No.: 02000175
- Added to NRHP: March 13, 2002

First Presbyterian Church is a historic church in Waurika, Oklahoma. It was built in 1908 and added to the National Register of Historic Places in 2002.

It is a one-story brick building with a side tower. It featured green-painted wood shingles in its gable ends and on the tower. Wide, overhanging boxed eaves seem to be consistent with Prairie School style. It has fifty-six-over-one windows on the front, fifty-six-over-four windows on the side, and one-over-one windows on the back.

It was designed by Amarillo, Texas architect J.C. Berry.

When listed in 2001, the building was owned by the city of Waurika and had not operated as a church since the 1980s.
