= Waurika, Oklahoma =

- City
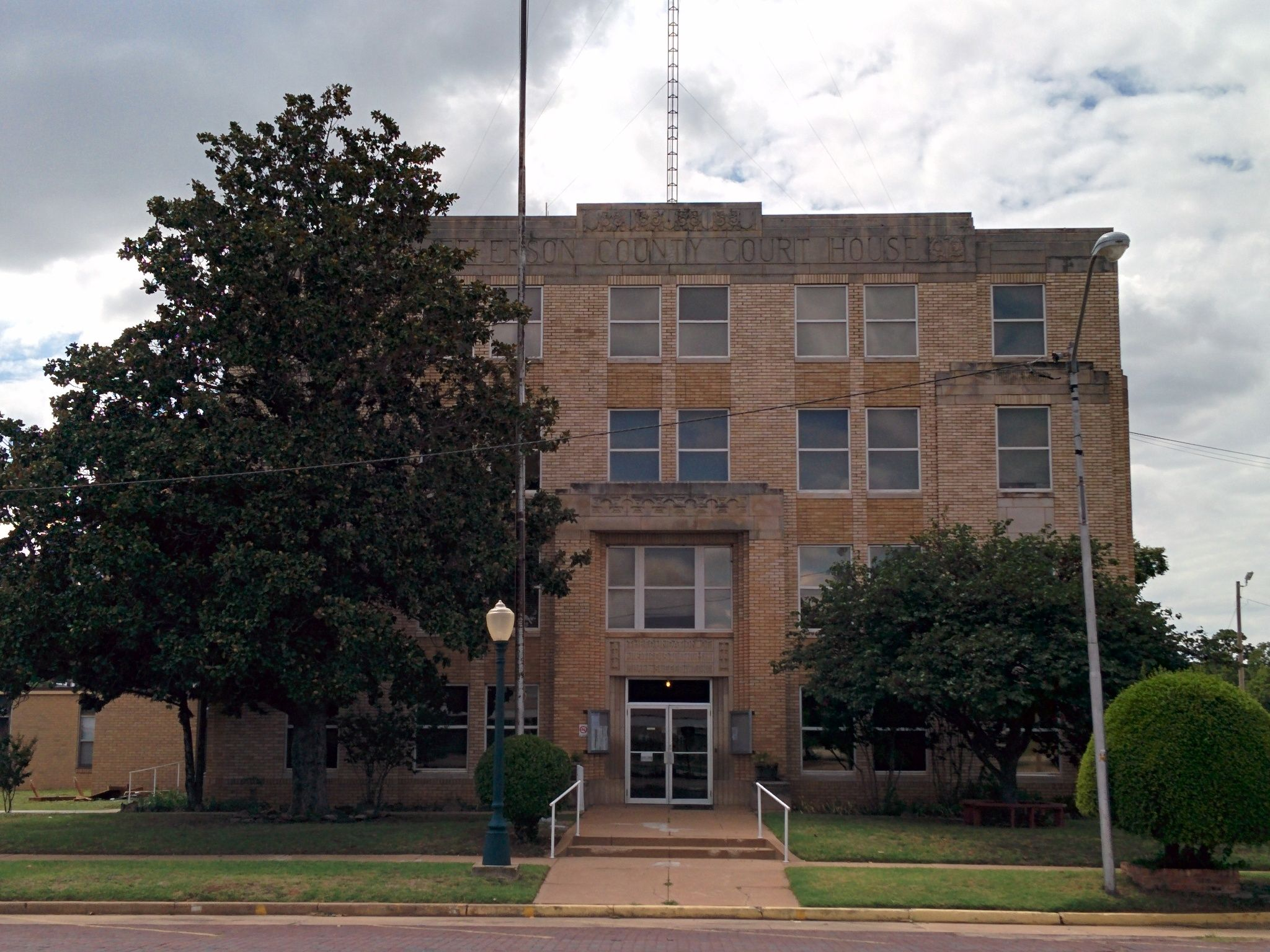
- Jefferson County Courthouse in Waurika c. 2014
- Motto: "On The Trail, By The Lake"
- Location within Oklahoma Location within the United States
- Coordinates: 34°10′12″N 98°0′5″W
- Country: United States
- State: Oklahoma
- County: Jefferson

Area
  - Total: 11.93 sq mi (30.90 km^{2})
  - Land: 11.92 sq mi (30.87 km^{2})
  - Water: 0.012 sq mi (0.03 km^{2})
- Elevation: 879 ft (268 m)

Population (2020)
  - Total: 1,837
  - Density: 154/sq mi (59.5/km^{2})
- Time zone: UTC-6 (Central (CST))
  - Summer (DST): UTC-5 (CDT)
- ZIP code: 73573
- Area code: 580
- FIPS code: 40-79250
- GNIS feature ID: 2412195
- Website: www.waurika.gov

Waurika is a city in and the county seat of Jefferson County, Oklahoma, United States. The population was 1,837 as of the 2020 United States census.

An article from 1985 in The Oklahoman claimed that Waurika promoted itself as "The Parakeet Capital of the World," while giving no explanation for using this slogan. The Waurika Chamber of Commerce website in 2020 echoed that the town was "once a parakeet paradise," but currently seems to be promoting the motto On The Trail, By The Lake, complete with a logo of a cowboy bronc-riding a fish.

== City name ==
The name is the anglicized version of the Comanche compound woarɨhka ("worm eater") from woa ("worm") + tɨhka ("eat") and presumably refers to early European settlers whose plowing humorously resembled digging for worms. Without indicating the source of their opinions, the City of Waurika and the Oklahoma Historical Society say the name means "clear (or pure) water" in some unidentified "American Indian language". This may be an example of the widespread occurrence of fanciful false etymologies of Native American place names, especially when the original Native language meaning is simple, insulting, vulgar, or unknown.

== History ==
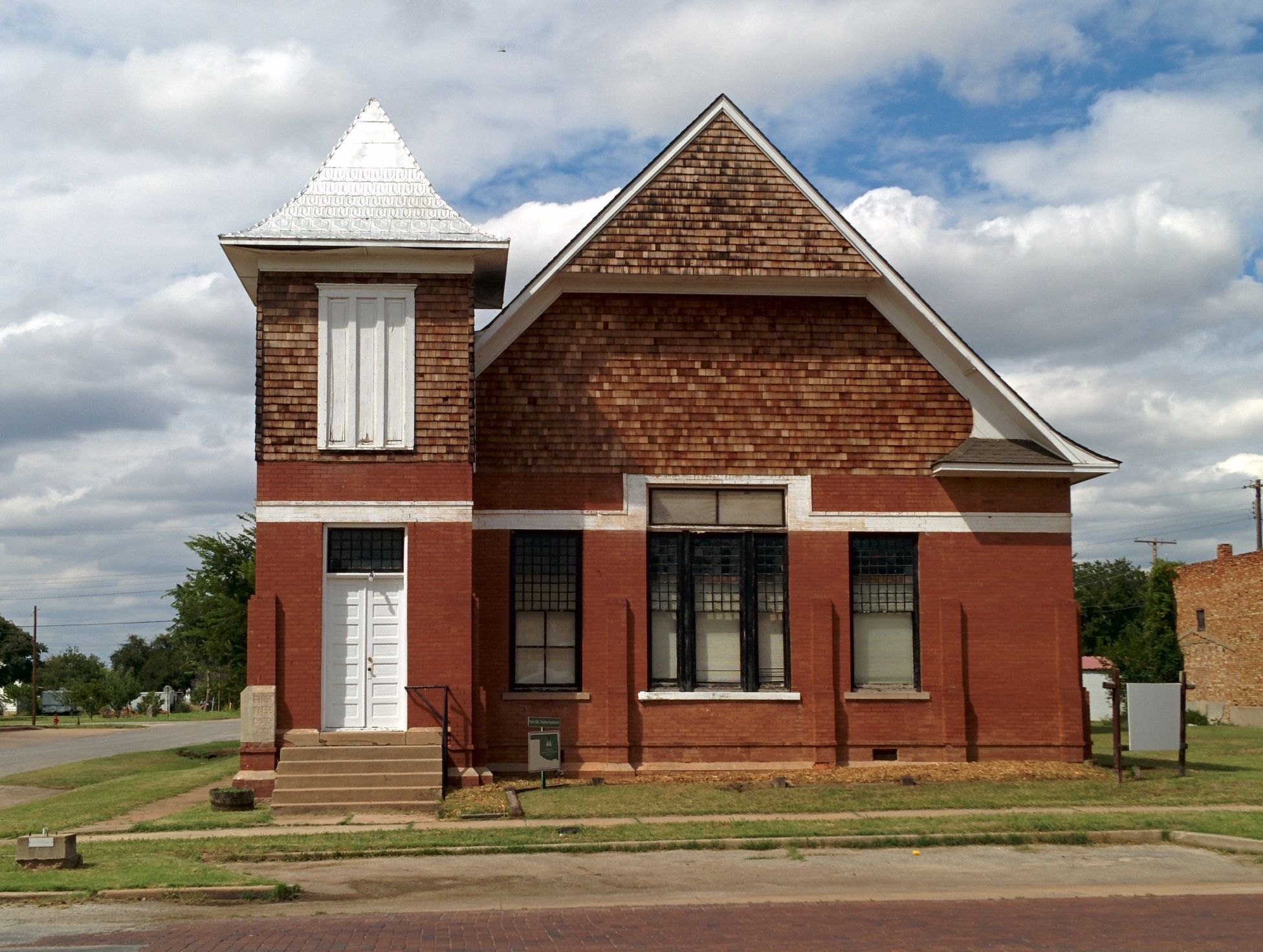
Former First Presbyterian Church transformed into a city office building. Listed on the US National Register of Historic Places.

Waurika was settled after the Comanche, Kiowa, and Apache Reservation was opened to non-Indians on August 6, 1901. The first white settler was James McGraw, who homesteaded on the present town site after moving from Burlington, Iowa. The first sale of town lots was held on June 18, 1902. Nearly three thousand people attended the sale.

Waurika was incorporated in May 1903. On May 8 of that year, C.A. McBrian was sworn in as the town's first mayor. At the time of its founding, Waurika was located in Pickens County, Chickasaw Nation.

The Chicago, Rock Island and Pacific Railway came to Waurika in January 1902 after the railroad superintendent "designated the town as a flag station." Waurika was formerly the northern terminus for the Wichita Falls and Oklahoma Railway, one of the 20th century properties of Frank Kell and Joseph A. Kemp of Wichita Falls, Texas, where the Kell House Museum is located today.

Historical population
Census	Pop.	Note	%±
1910	2,928		—
1920	3,204		9.4%
1930	2,368		−26.1%
1940	2,458		3.8%
1950	2,327		−5.3%
1960	1,933		−16.9%
1970	1,833		−5.2%
1980	2,369		29.2%
1990	2,088		−11.9%
2000	2,158		3.4%
2010	2,064		−4.4%
2020	1,837		−11.0%

== Geography ==
Waurika is located in northwestern Jefferson County. U.S. Route 70 passes through the southern side of the city, leading east 49 miles (79 km) to Ardmore and west 27 miles (43 km) to Randlett. U.S. Route 81 crosses US 70 in the southeastern corner of Waurika, leading north 26 miles (42 km) to Duncan and south 24 miles (39 km) to Ringgold. Oklahoma State Highway 5 (Waurika's Main Street) leads northwest 19 miles (31 km) to Temple. Waurika is approximately 109 miles (175 km) southwest of Oklahoma City.

According to the United States Census Bureau, Waurika has a total area of 12.5 square miles (32.4 km^{2}), of which 0.01 square miles (0.03 km^{2}), or 0.08%, are water. The city center lies on the east side of the valley of Beaver Creek, a south-flowing tributary of the Red River.

Waurika Lake is 6 miles (10 km) northwest of the city center.

=== Climate ===
Climate data for Waurika, Oklahoma (1991–2020)
Month	Jan	Feb	Mar	Apr	May	Jun	Jul	Aug	Sep	Oct	Nov	Dec	Year
Mean daily maximum °F (°C)	55.1 (12.8)	59.7 (15.4)	69.1 (20.6)	76.5 (24.7)	83.4 (28.6)	91.2 (32.9)	97.0 (36.1)	96.3 (35.7)	88.1 (31.2)	77.4 (25.2)	64.8 (18.2)	55.9 (13.3)	76.2 (24.6)
Daily mean °F (°C)	43.1 (6.2)	47.2 (8.4)	56.0 (13.3)	63.8 (17.7)	72.1 (22.3)	80.1 (26.7)	84.9 (29.4)	84.2 (29.0)	76.4 (24.7)	65.2 (18.4)	53.3 (11.8)	44.4 (6.9)	64.2 (17.9)
Mean daily minimum °F (°C)	31.1 (−0.5)	34.8 (1.6)	42.9 (6.1)	51.2 (10.7)	60.7 (15.9)	69.1 (20.6)	72.8 (22.7)	72.1 (22.3)	64.7 (18.2)	52.9 (11.6)	41.8 (5.4)	32.9 (0.5)	52.2 (11.3)
Average precipitation inches (mm)	1.56 (40)	1.77 (45)	2.50 (64)	3.10 (79)	4.32 (110)	3.87 (98)	2.34 (59)	2.96 (75)	3.11 (79)	2.93 (74)	2.09 (53)	1.65 (42)	32.2 (818)
Average snowfall inches (cm)	0.7 (1.8)	0.4 (1.0)	0.1 (0.25)	0.0 (0.0)	0.0 (0.0)	0.0 (0.0)	0.0 (0.0)	0.0 (0.0)	0.0 (0.0)	0.0 (0.0)	0.5 (1.3)	0.2 (0.51)	1.9 (4.86)
Source: NOAA

== Economy ==
Waurika's economy has largely been based on cattle raising, agriculture and petroleum production since the founding of the city.

== Demographics ==
=== 2020 census ===
As of the 2020 census, Waurika had a population of 1,837. The median age was 38.3 years, 25.5% of residents were under the age of 18, and 20.2% of residents were 65 years of age or older.

For every 100 females there were 90.8 males, and for every 100 females age 18 and over there were 92.1 males age 18 and over.

0% of residents lived in urban areas, while 100.0% lived in rural areas.

There were 702 households in Waurika, of which 33.5% had children under the age of 18 living in them. Of all households, 44.4% were married-couple households, 18.9% were households with a male householder and no spouse or partner present, and 30.1% were households with a female householder and no spouse or partner present. About 29.0% of all households were made up of individuals and 14.9% had someone living alone who was 65 years of age or older.

There were 907 housing units, of which 22.6% were vacant. Among occupied housing units, 63.0% were owner-occupied and 37.0% were renter-occupied. The homeowner vacancy rate was 5.1% and the rental vacancy rate was 19.1%.

Racial composition as of the 2020 census
Race	Percent
White	78.3%
Black or African American	0.8%
American Indian and Alaska Native	5.0%
Asian	0.8%
Native Hawaiian and Other Pacific Islander	0.1%
Some other race	5.7%
Two or more races	9.4%
Hispanic or Latino (of any race)	14.0%

=== 2000 census ===
As of the census of 2000, there were 1,988 people, 741 households, and 500 families residing in the city. The population density was 168.0 inhabitants per square mile (64.9/km^{2}). There were 929 housing units at an average density of 78.5 per square mile (30.3/km^{2}). The racial makeup of the city was 85.41% White, 1.81% African American, 4.28% Native American, 3.37% Asian, 0.10% Pacific Islander, 2.36% from other races, and 2.67% from two or more races. Hispanic or Latino of any race were 8.00% of the population.

There were 741 households, out of which 28.5% had children under the age of 18 living with them, 54.1% were married couples living together, 9.9% had a female householder with no husband present, and 32.4% were non-families. 30.5% of all households were made up of individuals, and 17.3% had someone living alone who was 65 years of age or older. The average household size was 2.35 and the average family size was 2.89.

In the city, the population was spread out, with 22.3% under the age of 18, 7.5% from 18 to 24, 29.1% from 25 to 44, 20.6% from 45 to 64, and 20.5% who were 65 years of age or older. The median age was 39 years. For every 100 females, there were 107.3 males. For every 100 females age 18 and over, there were 107.9 males.

The median income for a household in the city was $23,800, and the median income for a family was $31,594. Males had a median income of $24,844 versus $16,286 for females. The per capita income for the city was $13,496. About 6.4% of families and 12.2% of the population were below the poverty line, including 14.4% of those under age 18 and 17.4% of those age 65 or over.

== Government ==
Waurika has a home rule charter form of government.

== Notable people ==
- Bennie G. Adkins, United States Army Medal of Honor recipient born in Waurika
- Irene Champlin, actress born in Waurika
- Gary Chapman, singer and songwriter born in Waurika
- Ed Davis, Depression-era criminal born in Waurika
- Chris Kidd, Oklahoma state senator (2016–2024)
- James W. McCord Jr., CIA officer implicated in the Watergate scandal born in Waurika

== Places ==
The town's Rock Island Passenger Depot was rehabilitated starting in 1987, and in 2002 was added to the National Register of Historic Places listings in Jefferson County, Oklahoma. Also NHRP-listed are the First Presbyterian Church, the Jefferson County Courthouse, and the State Highway 79 Bridge at the Red River leading to Byers, Texas, which has since been demolished. There was a Chisholm Trail Historical Museum in Waurika, now closed.

Waurika Lake, completed in 1980, is 11 miles long, contains 192,000 acre feet of water at its normal elevation of 951 feet, has a surface area of 10,000 acres, and features 80 miles of shoreline.

== Notable events ==
The 1996 murder of Heather Rich brought brief notoriety to Waurika. Rich, a 16-year-old sophomore at the local high school, was murdered by two classmates and an acquaintance in a case that attracted national media coverage.
