= Ardmore micropolitan area =

Ardmore, Oklahoma Area
- Micropolitan Statistical Area
- Ardmore, OK Micropolitan Statistical Area
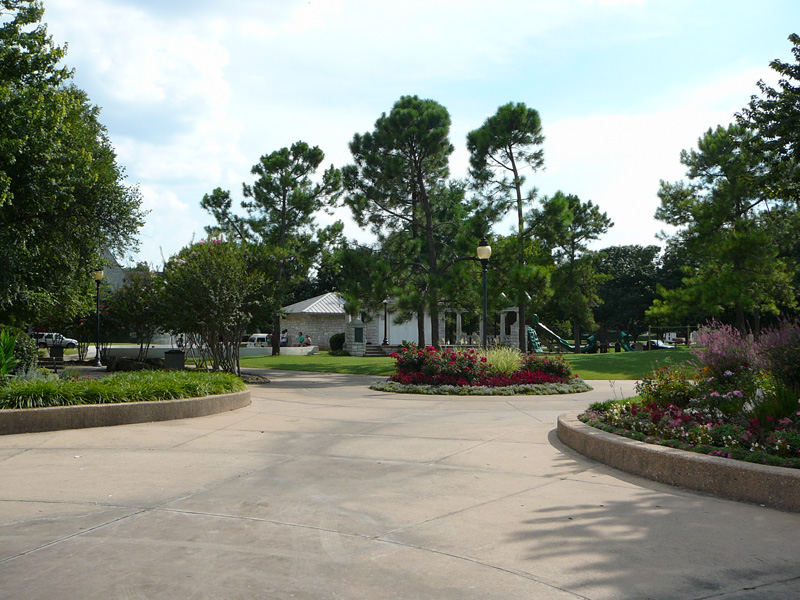
- Central Park in Ardmore
Interactive Map of Ardmore, OK μSA
City of Ardmore
Ardmore, OK μSA
- Country: United States
- State: Oklahoma
- Principal city: Ardmore
- Time zone: UTC-6 (CST)
  - Summer (DST): UTC-5 (CDT)

The Ardmore Micropolitan Statistical Area, as defined by the United States Census Bureau, is an area consisting of one county in South Central Oklahoma, anchored by the city of Ardmore.

As of the 2000 census, the μSA had a population of 54,452 (though a July 1, 2011 estimate placed the population at 57,482).

== County ==
- Carter

== Communities ==
- Places with more than 20,000 inhabitants
  - Ardmore (Principal city)
- Places with 1,000 to 5,000 inhabitants
  - Dickson
  - Healdton
  - Lone Grove
  - Marietta
  - Wilson
- Places with 500 to 1,000 inhabitants
  - Springer
- Places with less than 500 inhabitants
  - Gene Autry
  - Leon
  - Ratliff City
  - Tatums
  - Thackerville
- Unincorporated places
  - Burneyville
  - Courtney
  - Enville
  - Greenville
  - Jimtown
  - Orr
  - Overbrook
  - Rubottom

== Demographics ==
As of the census of 2000, there were 54,452 people, 21,434 households, and 15,205 families residing within the μSA. The racial makeup of the μSA was 78.93% White, 6.72% African American, 7.96% Native American, 0.55% Asian, 0.03% Pacific Islander, 1.53% from other races, and 4.28% from two or more races. Hispanic or Latino of any race were 3.47% of the population.

The median income for a household in the μSA was $30,982, and the median income for a family was $37,471. Males had a median income of $30,021 versus $20,728 for females. The per capita income for the μSA was $16,080.

== See also ==
- Oklahoma census statistical areas
