= National Register of Historic Places listings in Love County, Oklahoma =

Location of Love County in Oklahoma

This is a list of the National Register of Historic Places listings in Love County, Oklahoma.

This is intended to be a complete list of the properties on the National Register of Historic Places in Love County, Oklahoma, United States. The locations of National Register properties for which the latitude and longitude coordinates are included below, may be seen in a map.

There are 6 properties listed on the National Register in the county.

This National Park Service list is complete through NPS recent listings posted April 24, 2026.

== Current listings ==
	Name on the Register	Image	Date listed	Location	City or town	Description
1	Archeological Site 34LV181		December 13, 2010 (#10001015)	Address Restricted	Rubottom vicinity	
2	Archeological Site 34LV184		December 13, 2010 (#10001016)	Address Restricted	Leon vicinity	
3	Love County Courthouse	Love County Courthouse	August 23, 1984 (#84003148)	100 S. 4th St. 33°56′18″N 97°07′20″W	Marietta	
4	Love County Jail and Sheriff's Residence	Love County Jail and Sheriff's Residence	September 6, 2007 (#07000916)	408½ W. Chickasaw; 33°56′12″N 97°07′19″W	Marietta	
5	Santa Fe Depot	Santa Fe Depot	September 6, 2007 (#07000913)	101 SE Front; 33°56′12″N 97°06′58″W	Marietta	
6	Bill Washington Ranchhouse		July 27, 1971 (#71000667)	About 4 miles southwest of Marietta; 33°55′10″N 97°09′13″W	Marietta	Destroyed around 2000.

== See also ==
- List of National Historic Landmarks in Oklahoma
- National Register of Historic Places listings in Oklahoma
