= Burneyville, Oklahoma =

- Census-designated place
- Location within Oklahoma Location within the United States
- Coordinates: 33°54′16″N 97°17′25″W
- Country: United States
- State: Oklahoma
- County: Love

Area
  - Total: 18.04 sq mi (46.72 km^{2})
  - Land: 17.28 sq mi (44.75 km^{2})
  - Water: 0.76 sq mi (1.98 km^{2})
- Elevation: 771 ft (235 m)

Population (2020)
  - Total: 815
  - Density: 47.2/sq mi (18.21/km^{2})
- Time zone: UTC-6 (Central (CST))
  - Summer (DST): UTC-5 (CDT)
- ZIP code: 73430
- FIPS code: 40-10150
- GNIS feature ID: 2629937

Burneyville is an unincorporated community and census-designated place (CDP) in Love County, Oklahoma, United States. The post office was established May 5, 1879. It was named for David C. Burney, father of Benjamin Crooks Burney, who had been Governor of the Chickasaw Nation from 1878 through 1880.

Burneyville is located on State Highway 96 and reaches south to the north bank of the Red River.

The Census Bureau defined the Burneyville census-designated place in 2015; as of 2018 the estimated population was 627, with 489 housing units. As of the 2020 census, Burneyville had a population of 815.

== History ==
Burneyville and Love County were named for prominent Chickasaw people who settled in the area in the early 1840s as part of the Federal removal of the tribe from northern Mississippi to Indian Territory.

David C. Burney and his wife, Lucy James Burney, were Chickasaw who relocated to what was then Pickens County, Indian Territory, from northern Mississippi and established a farm on the site of the future town. The émigrés traveled to Indian Territory by steamboat up the Red River. They paused at Shreveport, Louisiana, on January 15, 1844, for the birth of a son. The family named him for the boat's captain, Benjamin Crooks.

Though the parents did not live to see it happen, both that son, Benjamin Burney, and a future son-in-law, Benjamin F. Overton, would be elected governors of the Chickasaw Nation in the late 1870s and early 1880s. The mother, Lucy, died in 1845, and the father, David, died shortly after the Civil War.

Prior to his death, the Chickasaw Nation honored David C. Burney in the naming of a girls' school. The Burney Academy opened in 1859. A post office was located there from July 3, 1860, to June 22, 1866, although it was probably not in continuous operation because of the Civil War. The site of the academy was 2 miles (3 km) southeast of Lebanon in what is now Marshall County.

Burney was honored posthumously when the Burneyville post office opened on the site of the family farm on May 5, 1879. The post office is the oldest in Love County that is still in use. The first postmaster was James C. Nall.

The location of the town of Burneyville has never changed. It is situated 10 miles (16 km) west-southwest of Marietta, the county seat. It is approximately 2 miles (3 km) north of the Red River. Walnut Creek Bayou passes to the north. The Burney Ferry, south of the Burney farm, was the main business and travel route before the Santa Fe Railroad completed its north–south link between Indian Territory and Texas in 1887.

With the merger of Indian Territory and Oklahoma Territory at statehood in 1907, the county of Love was carved from part of the former Pickens County. The county was named for Overton Love, an esteemed judge of the Chickasaw Nation court who had arrived in Indian Territory in 1843, one year prior to the Burney family.

For many years, Burneyville proper has consisted only of the post office, a Baptist church, two cemeteries, and 12 houses. But in its heyday through the first half of the 20th century, the townsite included a hotel, grocery, general merchandise store, blacksmith, druggist, and two doctors.

== Geography ==
The 73430 ZIP Code covers 93 square miles (240 km^{2}) of mostly farms and ranches in the lush bottomlands of the Red River. Growers specialize in peanuts, pecans, watermelons, grains, hay, and cattle. Oil leases dot the area, and horse trainers also have operations. Love County has been called "the shopping mall of the world for quarter horses" in reference to its abundance of top equine stock and training specialists in reining, cutting, roping, pleasure, and barrel racing events. Burneyville is 10 miles (16 km) west of Interstate 35, which leads north 113 miles (182 km) to Oklahoma City and south 86 miles (138 km) to Fort Worth, the sites of the major quarter horse competitions in the United States.

The small rural communities of Jimtown, Batson, and Turner are located within the 73430 ZIP Code, along with Burneyville.

== Demographics ==
=== 2020 census ===
As of the 2020 census, Burneyville had a population of 815. The median age was 51.5 years. 21.1% of residents were under the age of 18 and 28.2% of residents were 65 years of age or older. For every 100 females there were 85.6 males, and for every 100 females age 18 and over there were 87.5 males age 18 and over.

0.0% of residents lived in urban areas, while 100.0% lived in rural areas.

There were 343 households in Burneyville, of which 28.3% had children under the age of 18 living in them. Of all households, 57.1% were married-couple households, 16.0% were households with a male householder and no spouse or partner present, and 21.9% were households with a female householder and no spouse or partner present. About 21.6% of all households were made up of individuals and 11.9% had someone living alone who was 65 years of age or older.

There were 414 housing units, of which 17.1% were vacant. The homeowner vacancy rate was 4.3% and the rental vacancy rate was 20.8%.

Racial composition as of the 2020 census
Race	Number	Percent
White	647	79.4%
Black or African American	16	2.0%
American Indian and Alaska Native	54	6.6%
Asian	3	0.4%
Native Hawaiian and Other Pacific Islander	0	0.0%
Some other race	33	4.0%
Two or more races	62	7.6%
Hispanic or Latino (of any race)	54	6.6%

== Features ==
=== Falconhead Resort & Country Club ===
More than fifty percent of Burneyville residents live 2 miles (3 km) west of the post office, at Falconhead Resort & Country Club. Originally known as Turner's Lodge, it made golf history in the 1950s and 1960s as the smallest site ever to host both of golf's professional tours, the LPGA for women and the PGA for men. It was founded by southern Oklahoma oil millionaire Waco Turner.

Now semi-private, the course is a venue accessible to the average golfer to have been played by professionals. Among them were LPGA Hall of Famers Patty Berg, Betty Jameson, Betsy Rawls, Louise Suggs, Kathy Whitworth, Mickey Wright, and Babe Zaharias; and men's majors winners Jack Nicklaus, Raymond Floyd, Tommy Aaron, Charles Coody, Bob Goalby, Gay Brewer, Don January, Peter Thomson, Tony Lema, Kel Nagle, Jack Fleck, Al Geiberger, Byron Nelson, and Bobby Nichols. Oklahoma's U.S. Amateur champions Susie Maxwell Berning, Charles Coe, and Labron Harris Jr., were frequent playing guests of the Turners at what was their private hunting, fishing, and golfing retreat.

Some years, the Opie Turner Open and the Waco Turner Open paid more in prize money than any other tour stops. A total of 13 professional events were contested at Turner's Lodge from 1958 to 1965. The layout underwent a redesign by golf course architect Robert Trent Jones, Sr., and a name-change to Falconhead Resort & Country Club, in 1970. Public access to the course may be made by calling the golf shop. Lots, homes, condominiums, and townhouses may be toured by calling the administrative office.

=== Red River Research and Demonstration Farm ===
Three miles southeast of the Burneyville post office, agricultural research takes place at a demonstration farm of the renowned Samuel Roberts Noble Foundation, one of the top 50 grantmaking philanthropies in the United States. The foundation was established by Lloyd Noble, oil millionaire and lifelong friend of Waco Turner.

The Red River Research and Demonstration Farm is part of a distinguished operations division of the foundation, which brings scientists from around the world to southern Oklahoma to engage in plant biology, forage improvement, and agriculture research. Currently, the Noble Foundation is collaborating with the University of Oklahoma and Oklahoma State University in studying switchgrass as an alternative to carbon fuels. Their initiative, known as the Oklahoma Bioenergy Center, was established by the Oklahoma Legislature in 2008.

== Education ==
Turner School, the pre-kindergarten through grade 12 public school one-half mile west of Falconhead Resort & Country Club, is named in honor of Waco Turner. The gymnasium was named for his wife, Opie James Turner.

Before striking it rich in the oil fields of southern Oklahoma and east Texas in the 1920s, the couple had taught school at Burneyville. They donated the land for the consolidated Turner School, which combined the students of the former Burneyville, Courtney, Meadowbrook, and Dunbar schools.

Turner School and Falconhead Resort & Country Club (formerly the private Turner's Lodge) celebrate their 50th anniversaries in August 2008.

== Transportation ==
=== Airport ===
Falconhead Airport (37K) is located two nautical miles northwest of the central business district of Burneyville. Ardmore Downtown Executive Airport (1F0), with a 5014x75 ft runway in better condition, is 16 miles northeast.
