= Leon, Oklahoma =

- Town
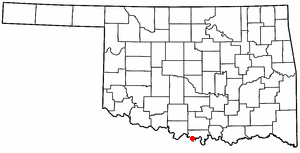
- Location of Leon, Oklahoma
- Coordinates: 33°52′38″N 97°25′45″W
- Country: United States
- State: Oklahoma
- County: Love

Area
  - Total: 0.27 sq mi (0.70 km^{2})
  - Land: 0.27 sq mi (0.70 km^{2})
  - Water: 0 sq mi (0.00 km^{2})
- Elevation: 807 ft (246 m)

Population (2020)
  - Total: 74
  - Density: 275.5/sq mi (106.39/km^{2})
- Time zone: UTC-6 (Central (CST))
  - Summer (DST): UTC-5 (CDT)
- ZIP code: 73441
- Area code: 580
- FIPS code: 40-42450
- GNIS feature ID: 2412890

Leon is a town in Love County, Oklahoma, United States. As of the 2020 census, the community had 74 residents. The town is old enough to appear on a 1911 Rand McNally map of the county.

== Geography ==
Leon is 1 mile (1.6 km) east of the Red River, which forms the Texas–Oklahoma border. Oklahoma State Highway 76 leads north from Leon 4 miles (6 km) to State Highway 32. Leon is 22 miles (35 km) west-southwest of Marietta, the Love county seat.

According to the United States Census Bureau, the town of Leon has a total area of 0.3 square miles (0.78 km^{2}), all land.

== Demographics ==
Historical population
Census	Pop.	Note	%±
1900	221		—
1910	197		−10.9%
1920	216		9.6%
1930	146		−32.4%
1940	178		21.9%
1950	122		−31.5%
1960	109		−10.7%
1970	112		2.8%
1980	120		7.1%
1990	101		−15.8%
2000	96		−5.0%
2010	91		−5.2%
2020	74		−18.7%
U.S. Decennial Census

Leon is part of the Ardmore micropolitan area.

=== 2020 census ===
As of the 2020 census, Leon had a population of 74. The median age was 46.0 years. 28.4% of residents were under the age of 18 and 28.4% of residents were 65 years of age or older. For every 100 females there were 111.4 males, and for every 100 females age 18 and over there were 140.9 males age 18 and over.

0.0% of residents lived in urban areas, while 100.0% lived in rural areas.

There were 32 households in Leon, of which 50.0% had children under the age of 18 living in them. Of all households, 34.4% were married-couple households, 31.3% were households with a male householder and no spouse or partner present, and 18.8% were households with a female householder and no spouse or partner present. About 15.7% of all households were made up of individuals and 15.7% had someone living alone who was 65 years of age or older.

There were 42 housing units, of which 23.8% were vacant. The homeowner vacancy rate was 3.3% and the rental vacancy rate was 37.5%.

Racial composition as of the 2020 census
Race	Number	Percent
White	49	66.2%
Black or African American	0	0.0%
American Indian and Alaska Native	1	1.4%
Asian	1	1.4%
Native Hawaiian and Other Pacific Islander	0	0.0%
Some other race	0	0.0%
Two or more races	23	31.1%
Hispanic or Latino (of any race)	3	4.1%

=== 2000 census ===
As of the census of 2000, there were 96 people, 34 households, and 24 families residing in the town. The population density was 363.6 people per square mile and roughly 551.8 animals per square mile (142.6/km^{2}). There were 42 housing units at an average density of 159.1 per square mile (61.4/km^{2}). The racial makeup of the town was 45.12% White, 12.50% Native American, 1.04% from other races, and 8.33% from two or more races. Hispanic or Latino of any race were 73.04% of the population.

There were 34 households, out of which 29.4% had children under the age of 18 living with them, 41.2% were married couples living together, 23.5% had a female householder with no husband present, and 29.4% were non-families. 23.5% of all households were made up of individuals, and 11.8% had someone living alone who was 65 years of age or older. The average household size was 2.82 and the average family size was 4.46.

In the town, the population was spread out, with 34.4% under the age of 18, 9.4% from 18 to 24, 22.9% from 25 to 44, 17.7% from 45 to 64, and 15.6% who were 65 years of age or older. The median age was 35 years. For every 100 females, there were 104.3 males. For every 100 females age 18 and over, there were 80.0 males.

The median income for a household in the town was $10,500, and the median income for a family was $21,667. Males had a median income of $12,000 versus $17,500 for females. The per capita income for the town was $18,908. There were 12.5% of families and 11.1% of the population living below the poverty line, including 15 teenagers and none of those over 64.

Many local persons refer to Leon as where they live and are from even though they do not specifically reside within the city limits. The Census data does not now reflect this, as a result of the fact that many residences which were once covered by the Leon zip code were reassigned in a recent 911 address change.

=== Religion ===
The majority of Leonites are Southern Baptist. The Leon Baptist Church, a member of the Enon Baptist Association, is the sole active church in the town.

== Economy ==
Leon currently has no businesses and currently is considered a bedroom community, in that those who live there commute to their respective places of employment. Leon is a potential location for a convenience store/ restaurant, as well as a location for an industrial production plant, or distribution center. Utilities are electrical, from the Red River Valley Rural Electrical Association Cooperative, and water is from the Rural Water Department Number One. There is no natural gas service at this time, with property occupants utilizing electric heat, propane, butane, and wood. Sanitation consists of individual property septic systems. Waste disposal is the responsibility of the property occupant. There is a local refuse route disposal company.

== Education ==
Most youth in Leon attend Turner Public Schools in Burneyville. Leon Public Schools was consolidated with Turner Public Schools in 1994.
