= Thackerville, Oklahoma =

- Town
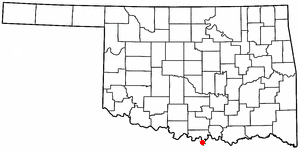
- Location of Thackerville, Oklahoma
- Coordinates: 33°47′37″N 97°08′32″W
- Country: United States
- State: Oklahoma
- County: Love

Area
  - Total: 2.25 sq mi (5.83 km^{2})
  - Land: 2.24 sq mi (5.80 km^{2})
  - Water: 0.012 sq mi (0.03 km^{2})
- Elevation: 866 ft (264 m)

Population (2020)
  - Total: 400
  - Density: 178.6/sq mi (68.94/km^{2})
- Time zone: UTC-6 (Central (CST))
  - Summer (DST): UTC-5 (CDT)
- ZIP code: 73459
- Area code: 580
- FIPS code: 40-73200
- GNIS feature ID: 2413381

Thackerville is a town in Love County, Oklahoma, United States. It is located near the Texas state border. The population was 400 at the 2020 census.

== Geography ==
Thackerville is situated near the intersection of U.S. Highway 77 and State Highway 153, five miles north of the Texas state line and ten miles south of Marietta in south central Love County. Interstate 35 passes through town, putting Thackerville on the main route between Oklahoma City and Dallas/Ft. Worth.

According to the United States Census Bureau, the town has a total area of 2.1 square miles (5.4 km^{2}), all land.

== History ==
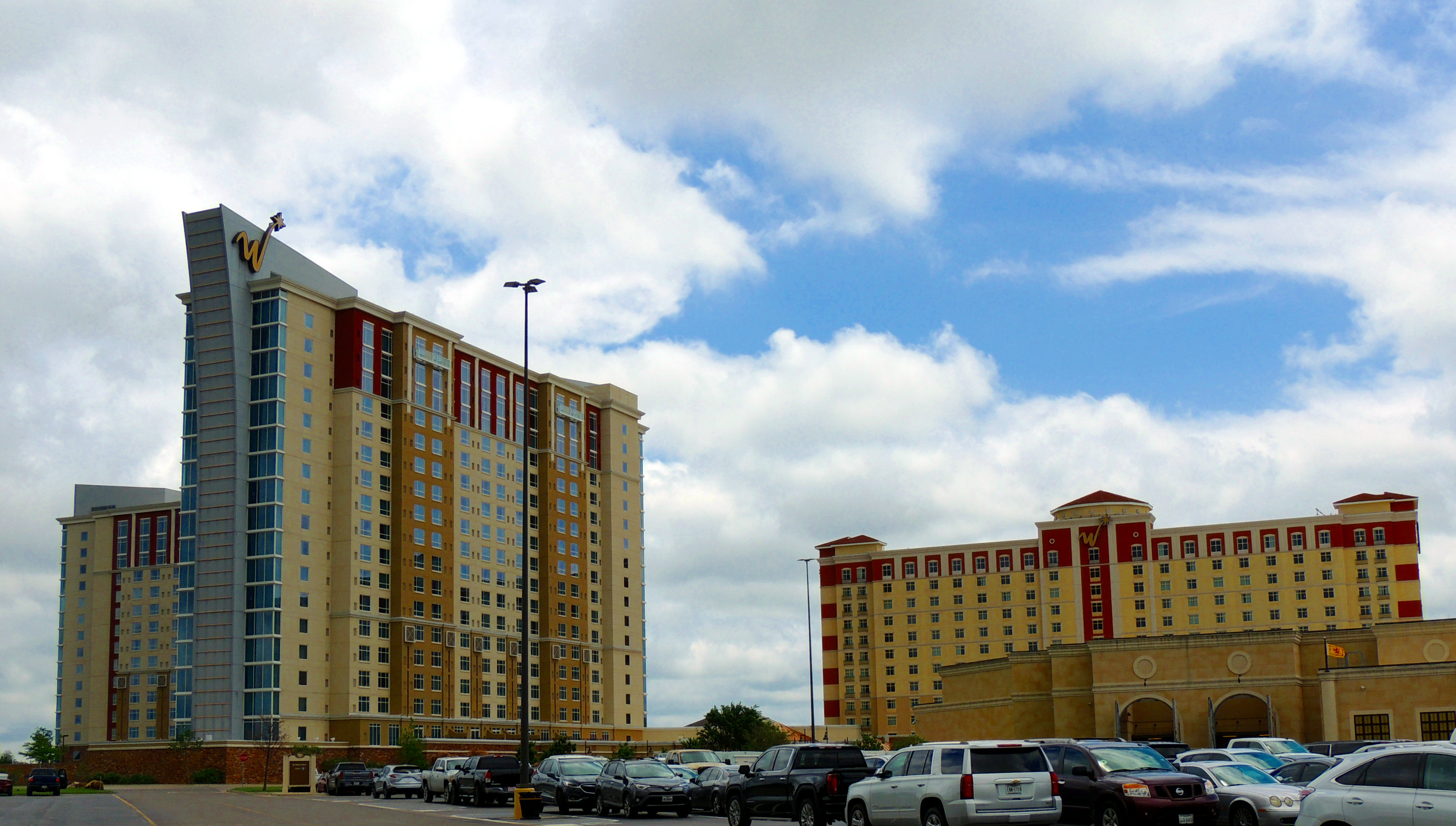
The WinStar World Casino is the largest casino in the world

Thackerville was founded in the mid-19th century. The community is named after Zacariah Thacker, a pioneer from Arkansas. It is believed that he was headed for the Amarillo, Texas area, but he camped one night at Wolf Hollow Creek in Indian Territory and remained there until his death a few years later. Thacker befriended some of the local Indians and together they farmed a very productive corn crop. Before long, many people began settling in the area.

After Thacker's death in 1887, the community relocated from its original site near where Wolf Creek enters the Red River, to its present location. The main reason behind the move was to be closer to the Gulf, Colorado & Santa Fe Railway. A depot was constructed and the first grocery store, built by Oce McCage, opened across from it. Soon after, a school, churches, and a post office were constructed. Thackerville had a dirt main street with board walks that connected store porches.

Court records filed in the United States Court, Southern District, in Indian Territory at Ardmore indicate that citizens of the community petitioned to incorporate Thackerville under Arkansas law on October 15, 1898. At that time, approximately 175 people lived in the community. On July 5, 1899, Thackerville was officially incorporated into Indian Territory by Judge Hosea Townsend.

At the time of its founding, Thackerville was located in Pickens County, Chickasaw Nation.

U.S. Highway 77 was established from the Red River through Thackerville in 1926. At that time, the town moved to each side of the highway, which became the new "main" street in the community. Thackerville's population fluctuated throughout the remainder of the 20th century, reaching a low of 178 in 1950 and peaking at 431 in 1980.

Thackerville is the location of the WinStar World Casino, operated by the Chickasaw Nation, which is billed as the “World’s Biggest Casino.”

== Demographics ==
Historical population
Census	Pop.	Note	%±
1920	210		—
1930	185		−11.9%
1940	207		11.9%
1950	178		−14.0%
1960	185		3.9%
1970	257		38.9%
1980	431		67.7%
1990	290		−32.7%
2000	404		39.3%
2010	445		10.1%
2020	400		−10.1%
U.S. Decennial Census

Thackerville is part of the Ardmore, Oklahoma Micropolitan Statistical Area.

=== 2020 census ===
As of the 2020 census, Thackerville had a population of 400. The median age was 39.7 years. 22.5% of residents were under the age of 18 and 18.8% of residents were 65 years of age or older. For every 100 females there were 106.2 males, and for every 100 females age 18 and over there were 100.0 males age 18 and over.

0.0% of residents lived in urban areas, while 100.0% lived in rural areas.

There were 165 households in Thackerville, of which 41.2% had children under the age of 18 living in them. Of all households, 45.5% were married-couple households, 18.8% were households with a male householder and no spouse or partner present, and 23.6% were households with a female householder and no spouse or partner present. About 20.6% of all households were made up of individuals and 7.2% had someone living alone who was 65 years of age or older.

There were 189 housing units, of which 12.7% were vacant. The homeowner vacancy rate was 0.9% and the rental vacancy rate was 5.1%.

Racial composition as of the 2020 census
Race	Number	Percent
White	343	85.8%
Black or African American	4	1.0%
American Indian and Alaska Native	18	4.5%
Asian	0	0.0%
Native Hawaiian and Other Pacific Islander	0	0.0%
Some other race	12	3.0%
Two or more races	23	5.8%
Hispanic or Latino (of any race)	28	7.0%

=== 2000 census ===
At the 2000 census there were 404 people, 149 households, and 108 families living in the town. The population density was 189.5 inhabitants per square mile (73.2/km^{2}). There were 166 housing units at an average density of 77.9 per square mile (30.1/km^{2}). The racial makeup of the town was 89.85% White, 4.70% Native American, 0.25% Asian, 0.99% from other races, and 4.21% from two or more races. Hispanic or Latino of any race were 2.97%.

Of the 149 households 34.9% had children under the age of 18 living with them, 57.7% were married couples living together, 8.7% had a female householder with no husband present, and 27.5% were non-families. 23.5% of households were one person and 9.4% were one person aged 65 or older. The average household size was 2.71 and the average family size was 3.18.

The age distribution was 29.2% under the age of 18, 7.2% from 18 to 24, 26.5% from 25 to 44, 26.2% from 45 to 64, and 10.9% 65 or older. The median age was 37 years. For every 100 females, there were 117.2 males. For every 100 females age 18 and over, there were 110.3 males.

The median household income was $22,750 and the median family income was $45,893. Males had a median income of $29,375 versus $18,611 for females. The per capita income for the town was $19,605. About 7.7% of families and 13.5% of the population were below the poverty line, including 10.9% of those under age 18 and 22.2% of those age 65 or over.

== Education ==
Thackerville Public Schools, a PK-12 school district, serves the town of Thackerville as well as unincorporated areas in south central Love County.

== In popular culture ==
Terry Bradshaw, four-time Super Bowl champion, maintained a ranch in Thackerville which was the home location for his reality TV show, The Bradshaw Bunch. Bradshaw sold the ranch in late 2023.

Thackerville was also the site of a proposed relocation of the Greater Wynnewood Exotic Animal Park once run by Joe Exotic and subject of the Netflix series Tiger King.
