= Greenville, Oklahoma =

- Census-designated place
- Location within Oklahoma Location within the United States
- Coordinates: 34°00′18″N 97°07′50″W
- Country: United States
- State: Oklahoma
- County: Love

Area
  - Total: 1.29 sq mi (3.34 km^{2})
  - Land: 1.27 sq mi (3.30 km^{2})
  - Water: 0.015 sq mi (0.04 km^{2})
- Elevation: 768 ft (234 m)

Population (2020)
  - Total: 167
  - Density: 131.1/sq mi (50.63/km^{2})
- Time zone: UTC-6 (Central (CST))
  - Summer (DST): UTC-5 (CDT)
- ZIP Code: 73448 (Marietta)
- Area code: 580
- FIPS code: 40-31375
- GNIS feature ID: 2629921

Greenville is an unincorporated community and census-designated place (CDP) in Love County, Oklahoma, United States. It was first listed as a CDP following the 2010 census. As of the 2020 census, Greenville had a population of 167. However, the settlement itself is old enough to appear on a 1911 Rand McNally map of the county.

The CDP is in northeastern Love County, along U.S. Route 77, 5 miles (8 km) north of Marietta, the county seat, and 12 miles (19 km) south of Ardmore. Interstate 35 passes just west of Greenville, with access from Exit 21 (Oswalt Road) 2 miles (3 km) to the north.

== Demographics ==
Historical population
Census	Pop.	Note	%±
2020	167		—
U.S. Decennial Census

=== 2020 census ===
As of the 2020 census, Greenville had a population of 167. The median age was 41.5 years. 22.2% of residents were under the age of 18 and 26.3% of residents were 65 years of age or older. For every 100 females there were 89.8 males, and for every 100 females age 18 and over there were 113.1 males age 18 and over.

0.0% of residents lived in urban areas, while 100.0% lived in rural areas.

There were 68 households in Greenville, of which 26.5% had children under the age of 18 living in them. Of all households, 27.9% were married-couple households, 45.6% were households with a male householder and no spouse or partner present, and 20.6% were households with a female householder and no spouse or partner present. About 41.2% of all households were made up of individuals and 22.1% had someone living alone who was 65 years of age or older.

There were 78 housing units, of which 12.8% were vacant. The homeowner vacancy rate was 8.5% and the rental vacancy rate was 0.0%.

Racial composition as of the 2020 census
Race	Number	Percent
White	128	76.6%
Black or African American	1	0.6%
American Indian and Alaska Native	9	5.4%
Asian	5	3.0%
Native Hawaiian and Other Pacific Islander	0	0.0%
Some other race	16	9.6%
Two or more races	8	4.8%
Hispanic or Latino (of any race)	11	6.6%
