= Love County Airport =

- IATA: none; ICAO: none; FAA LID: 4O2

Summary
- Airport type: Public
- Owner: Barbara Grizzelle
- Location: Marietta, Oklahoma
- Elevation AMSL: 900 ft / 274 m
- Coordinates: 33°57′05″N 097°08′46″W
- Interactive map of Love County Airport

Runways
Direction	Length		Surface
Direction	ft	m	Surface
17/35	3,250	991	Turf
- Source: Federal Aviation Administration

Love County Airport (FAA LID: 4O2) was a public-use airport located two nautical miles northwest of the central business district of Marietta, a city in Love County, Oklahoma, United States. It has since closed.

== Facilities and aircraft ==
Love County Airport resided at an elevation of 900 feet (274 m) above mean sea level. It had one runway designated 17/35 with a turf surface measuring 3,250 by 35 feet (991 x 11 m).
