= Overbrook, Oklahoma =

- Unincorporated community
- Location within Oklahoma Location within the United States
- Coordinates: 34°04′02″N 97°08′28″W
- Country: United States
- State: Oklahoma
- County: Love
- Elevation: 755 ft (230 m)
- Time zone: UTC-6 (Central (CST))
  - Summer (DST): UTC-5 (CDT)
- ZIP code: 73453
- GNIS feature ID: 1096352

Overbrook is an unincorporated community in Love County, Oklahoma, United States. Overbrook has a post office with the ZIP code 73453. The settlement is old enough to appear on a 1911 Rand McNally map of the county.

Overbrook is named for Overbrook station, the first stop west of Philadelphia, Pennsylvania on the former Pennsylvania Railroad's prestigious Main Line, located in the city's Overbrook section. It is one of several Oklahoma communities between Fort Worth and Oklahoma City that were named or renamed for PRR Main Line stations between Philadelphia and Paoli by the Santa Fe Railway on its Gulf Coast main line (now part of BNSF Railway).
