= McGehee Catfish Restaurant Airport =

- IATA: none; ICAO: none; FAA LID: T40

Summary
- Airport type: Public
- Owner: Enid McGehee
- Location: Marietta, Oklahoma
- Elevation AMSL: 760 ft / 232 m
- Coordinates: 33°53′56″N 097°10′14″W
- Interactive map of McGehee Catfish Restaurant Airport

Runways
Direction	Length		Surface
Direction	ft	m	Surface
17/35	2,450	747	Turf
- Source: Federal Aviation Administration

McGehee Catfish Restaurant Airport (FAA LID: T40) is a privately owned, public-use airport located five nautical miles (6 mi, 9 km) southwest of the central business district of Marietta, a city in Love County, Oklahoma, United States.

The runway is currently closed indefinitely.

== Facilities and aircraft ==
McGehee Catfish Restaurant Airport covers an area of 8 acres (3.2 ha) at an elevation of 760 feet (232 m) above mean sea level. It has one runway designated 17/35 with a turf surface measuring 2,450 by 55 feet (747 x 17 m). The airport is closed and non-operational as of February 2020.
