= Thackerville Public Schools =

School district in Oklahoma, United States

Thackerville Public Schools is a PK-12 public school district based in the town of Thackerville, Oklahoma, United States.

In addition to Thackerville, the district also serves unincorporated areas in south-central Love County.

Thackerville's public schools are located on campus at the junction of U.S. Highway 77 and State Highway 153. Thackerville Elementary School serves students in grades Pre-Kindergarten through five. Thackerville Middle School and Thackerville High School serves students in grades six through twelve.
