= Falconhead Airport =

- IATA: none; ICAO: none; FAA LID: 37K

Summary
- Airport type: Public
- Owner: Falconhead Airport & Av. Svcs. Llc
- Serves: Burneyville, Oklahoma
- Elevation AMSL: 690 ft (210 m)
- Coordinates: 33°55′34″N 097°17′47″W
- Website: FalconheadAirport.com
- Interactive map of Falconhead Airport

Runways
Direction	Length		Surface
Direction	ft	m	Surface
18/36	4,400	1,341	Asphalt

Statistics (2010)
- Aircraft operations: 460
- Based aircraft: 6
- Source: Federal Aviation Administration

Falconhead Airport (FAA LID: 37K) is a public use airport located two nautical miles (2.3 mi, 3.7 km) northwest of the central business district of Burneyville, in Love County, Oklahoma, United States. It is privately owned by Falconhead Airport and Aviation Services, LLC.

The airport is located adjacent to the Falconhead Resort & Country Club.

== Facilities and aircraft ==
Falconhead Airport covers an area of 114 acres (46 ha) at an elevation of 690 feet (210 m) above mean sea level. It has one runway designated 18/36 with an asphalt surface measuring 4,400 by 75 feet (1,341 x 23 m).

For the 12-month period ending January 6, 2010, the airport had 460 aircraft operations, an average of 38 per month: 98% general aviation and 2% military. At that time there were 6 aircraft based at this airport: 83% single-engine and 17% multi-engine.

== See also ==
- List of airports in Oklahoma
