= Love County Jail and Sheriff's Residence =

Historic government building in Oklahoma, United States

- U.S. National Register of Historic Places
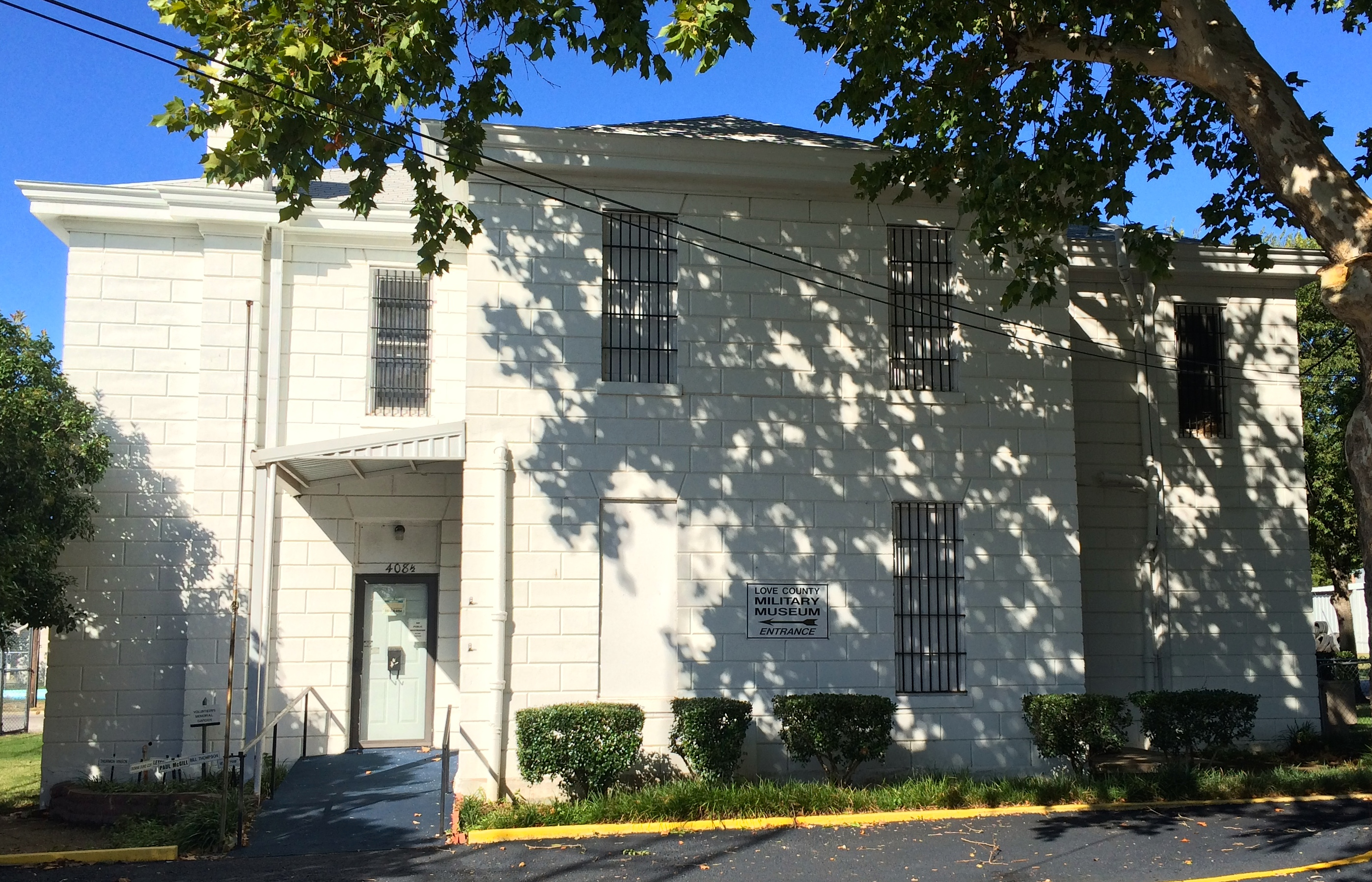

- Location within Oklahoma
- Location: 408½ W. Chickasaw, Marietta, Oklahoma
- Coordinates: 33°56′12″N 97°07′19″W
- Area: less than one acre
- Built: 1910
- Built by: Taylor, Walter; Falls Creek Construction Co.
- Architectural style: Cruciform plan
- NRHP reference No.: 07000916
- Added to NRHP: September 6, 2007

The Love County Jail and Sheriff's Residence, at 408 1/2 W. Chickasaw in Marietta, Oklahoma, was built in 1910. It was listed on the National Register of Historic Places in 2007.

It is a cruciform plan building which had jail cells for inmates on the second floor and a residence for the sheriff on the first floor.
