= The Bradshaw Bunch =

American reality television series

- Genre: Reality television
- Country of origin: United States
- Original language: English
- No. of seasons: 2
- No. of episodes: 23

Production
- Executive producers: Adam Karpel; Dan Peirson; James Davis; Jason Ehrlich; Lisa Shannon; Terry Bradshaw
- Production companies: Shed Media; Warner Horizon Unscripted Television

Original release
- Network: E!
- Release: September 17, 2020 – January 5, 2022

The Bradshaw Bunch is an American reality television program on E! featuring four-time NFL Super Bowl champion quarterback Terry Bradshaw and his family. The series premiered on September 17, 2020. It was filmed at Bradshaw's ranch in Thackerville, Oklahoma.

On November 12, 2020, the series was renewed for a second season, which premiered on October 6, 2021.

== Cast ==
- Terry Bradshaw
- Tammy Bradshaw
- Rachel Bradshaw
- Lacey Hester Bradshaw
- Erin Bradshaw Weiss

== Episodes ==
=== Series overview ===
Season	Episodes	Originally released	
Season	Episodes	First released	Last released
1	10	September 17, 2020	November 5, 2020
2	13	October 6, 2021	January 5, 2022

=== Season 1 (2020) ===
No. overall	No. in season	Title	Original release date	U.S. viewers (millions)
1	1	"Three Daughters, Three Problems"	September 17, 2020	0.81
2	2	"Terry's in a Jam"	September 17, 2020	N/A
3	3	"Mr. Wrong"	September 24, 2020	0.69
4	4	"A Few Good Men"	October 1, 2020	0.54
5	5	"Quarantine Crazy"	October 8, 2020	0.66
6	6	"Man Problems"	October 15, 2020	0.67
7	7	"Fit for the Fast Lane"	October 22, 2020	0.64
8	8	"Oui Oui Terr-y"	October 29, 2020	0.75
9	9	"Top Chef"	November 5, 2020	0.58
10	10	"Three Daughters, Three Solutions"	November 5, 2020	0.61

=== Season 2 (2021–2022) ===
No. overall	No. in season	Title	Original release date	U.S. viewers (millions)
11	1	"Love Island"	October 6, 2021	0.50
12	2	"Working Slime to Five"	October 13, 2021	0.44
13	3	"Playing the Field & Playing the Feud"	October 20, 2021	0.48
14	4	"Walk of Fame/ Walk of Shame"	October 27, 2021	0.45
15	5	"Babies & Bourbon"	November 3, 2021	0.50
16	6	"Pappy's Little Touchdown"	November 10, 2021	0.43
17	7	"A Faire to Remember"	November 17, 2021	0.48
18	8	"Speak from the Heart"	December 1, 2021	0.55
19	9	"A Very Bradshaw Christmas"	December 8, 2021	0.37
20	10	"Horse Shows & Hot Sauces"	December 15, 2021	0.43
21	11	"Hometown Hero"	December 22, 2021	0.53
22	12	"Random Acts of Kindness"	December 29, 2021	N/A
23	13	"Music City Memories"	January 5, 2022	0.56

=== Special ===
Featured season	Title	Original release date	US viewers (millions)
2	"Season 2 Kickoff Special"	August 11, 2021	0.49
