= Enville, Oklahoma =

- Unincorporated community
- Location within Oklahoma Location within the United States
- Coordinates: 33°59′01″N 96°59′11″W
- Country: United States
- State: Oklahoma
- County: Love
- Elevation: 709 ft (216 m)
- Time zone: UTC-6 (Central (CST))
  - Summer (DST): UTC-5 (CDT)
- GNIS feature ID: 1092632

Enville is a community located in eastern Love County, Oklahoma, United States. A post office was established at Enville, Indian Territory on June 16, 1904, and closed January 15, 1935. The name is said to have been coined from a contraction of the phrase, "end of the road ville."

At the time of its founding, Enville was located in Pickens County, Chickasaw Nation.

Enville is the birthplace of noted Western actor, singer and composer, and Country Music Hall of Fame inductee Johnny Bond.

== Sources ==
- Foreman, Grant. "First Post Offices Within the Boundaries of Oklahoma". Chronicles of Oklahoma. 26:2 (June 1948) p. 200. (accessed March 1, 2008)
- Shirk, George H. Oklahoma Place Names. Norman: University of Oklahoma Press, 1987. ISBN 0-8061-2028-2 .
- Thompson, Chuck; Robert Medley; Rhonda Shephard; researchers. "Singers, Songwriters, & Musicians & the Place They Call Home". Oklahoma Today . Vol. 41 No. 1, February 1992, p. 22. (accessed March 1, 2008)
