= Oscar G. Harper =

Former clerk of the Oklahoma Constitutional Convention

Oscar Greene Harper from Missouri was the clerk of the Oklahoma Constitutional Convention, which was held in 1906–1907. When Harper County, Oklahoma was founded on July 16, 1907, it was named after Harper, who was also a school teacher and local resident in that area.
