= Jimtown, Oklahoma =

- Unincorporated community
- Location within Oklahoma Location within the United States
- Coordinates: 33°51′43″N 97°22′10″W
- Country: United States
- State: Oklahoma
- County: Love
- Elevation: 761 ft (232 m)
- Time zone: UTC-6 (Central (CST))
  - Summer (DST): UTC-5 (CDT)
- GNIS feature ID: 1100538

Jimtown is a small unincorporated community in Love County, Oklahoma, United States. The settlement is old enough to appear on a 1911 Rand McNally map of the county.
