= Love County Courthouse =

- U.S. National Register of Historic Places
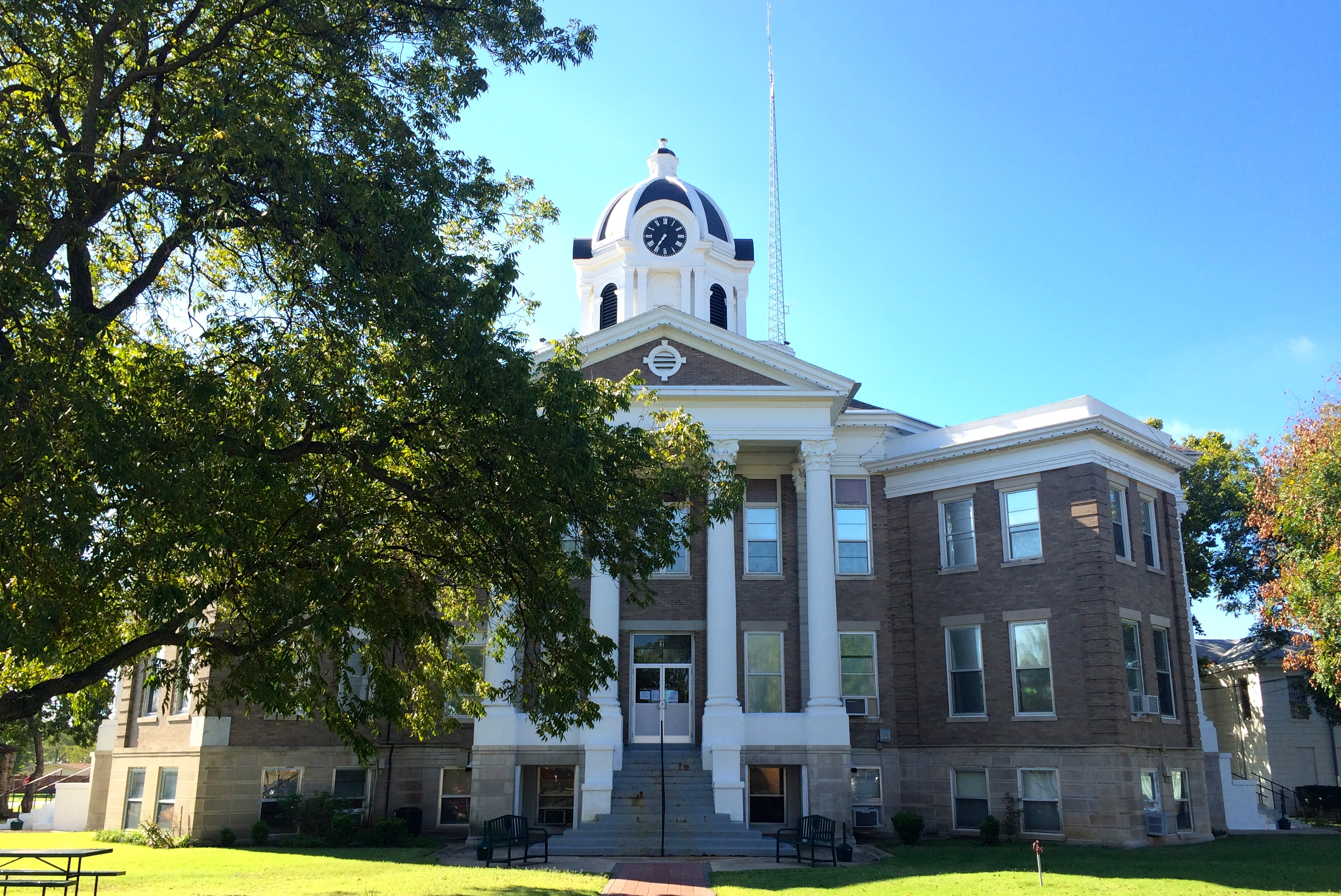

- Location within Oklahoma Location within the United States
- Location: 405 w main st, Marietta, Oklahoma
- Coordinates: 33°56′18″N 97°07′20″W
- Area: 1.5 acres (0.61 ha)
- Built: 1907-1910
- Architectural style: Georgian
- MPS: County Courthouses of Oklahoma TR
- NRHP reference No.: 84003148
- Added to NRHP: August 23, 1984

The Love County Courthouse, located at 100 S. 4th St. in Marietta, Oklahoma, was built in 1907–10 to serve Love County. It was listed on the National Register of Historic Places in 1984.

It is three stories tall, or two stories plus a raised basement. It is 75 by 75 feet (23 m × 23 m) in plan.
