= Rubottom, Oklahoma =

- Unincorporated community
- Location within Oklahoma Location within the United States
- Coordinates: 33°56′25″N 97°27′25″W
- Country: United States
- State: Oklahoma
- County: Love
- Elevation: 853 ft (260 m)
- Time zone: UTC-6 (Central (CST))
  - Summer (DST): UTC-5 (CDT)
- GNIS feature ID: 1097516

Rubottom is an unincorporated community in Love County, Oklahoma, United States.

A post office was established at Rubottom, Indian Territory on Aug. 14, 1902. It was named for William P. Rubottom, a prominent landowner and cotton gin operator. At the time of its founding, Rubottom was located in Pickens County, Chickasaw Nation.

The community is part of the Turner Independent School District.
