= Overton Love =

American judge

Overton "Sobe" Love (c. 1823-1906) was a Chickasaw judge in Indian Territory in the nineteenth century. Love was born in Holly Springs, Mississippi c. 1823, the son of Colonel Henry W. Love. Overton was among the Chickasaw forced to move to Indian Territory in the 1840s during Indian removal. In Indian Territory, he was one of the largest landowners in the Chickasaw Nation, farming and raising cattle on 8,000 acres (32 km^{2}) of Red River bottomland. Love was a judge in the Pickens District of the Chickasaw Nation for many years. As a judge in the Dawes Commission era, Love worked to add tribal members to the Chickasaw Roll of Citizenship. Love also served as a Chickasaw representative to Congress and was named Treaty Commissioner on behalf of the Chickasaw Nation.

Love County, Oklahoma was named after Overton Love. He died in November 1906.
