= Love County, Oklahoma =

County in Oklahoma, United States

- County
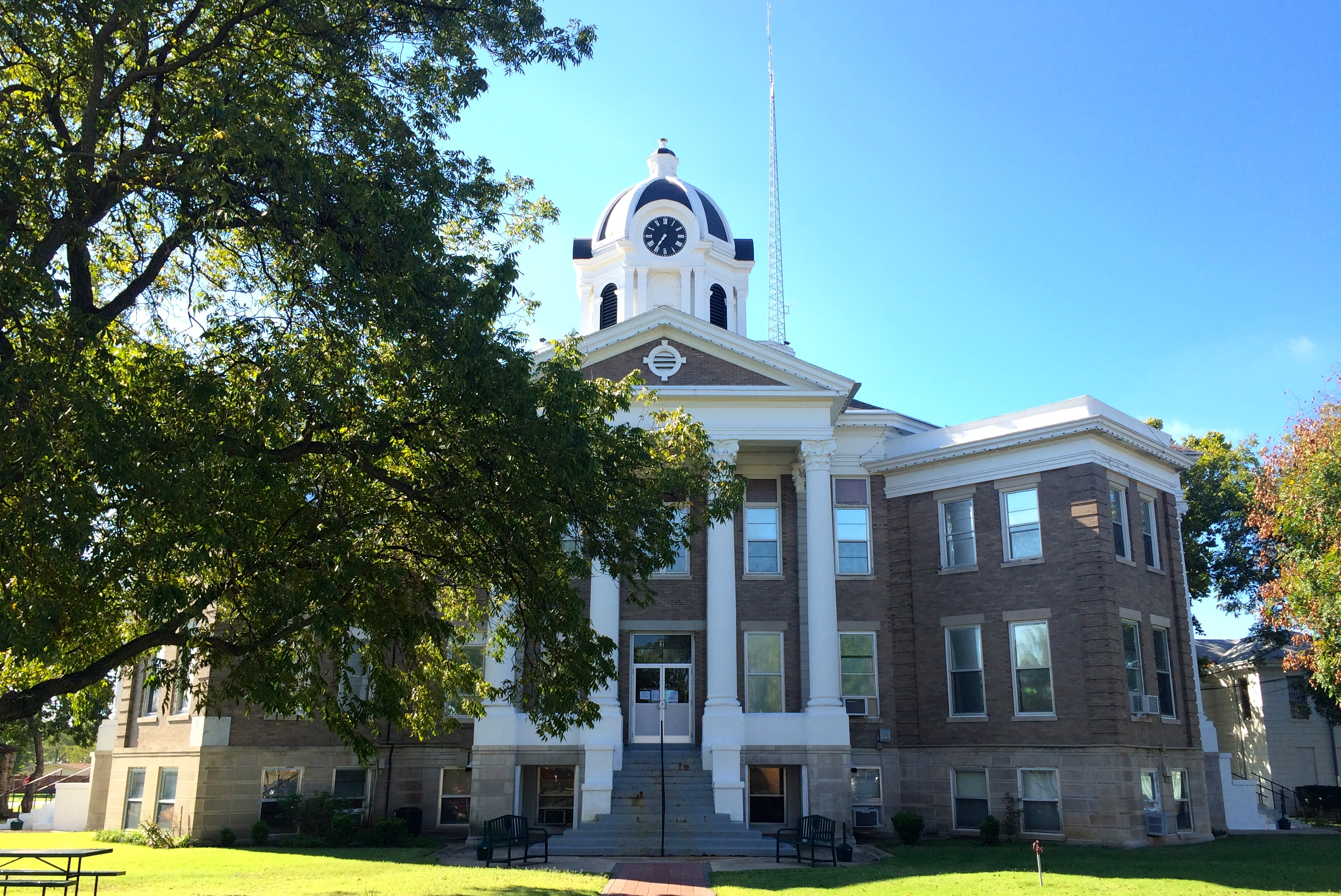
- Love County Courthouse in October 2014

- Location within the U.S. state of Oklahoma
- Coordinates: 33°57′N 97°15′W
- Country: United States
- State: Oklahoma
- Founded: 1907
- Named for: Overton Love, a judge of the Chickasaw Nation
- Seat: Marietta
- Largest city: Marietta

Area
  - Total: 532 sq mi (1,380 km^{2})
  - Land: 514 sq mi (1,330 km^{2})
  - Water: 18 sq mi (47 km^{2}) 3.5%

Population (2020)
  - Estimate (2025): 10,780 ▲
- Time zone: UTC−6 (Central)
  - Summer (DST): UTC−5 (CDT)
- Congressional district: 4th
- Website: love.okcounties.org

Love County is a county on the southern border of the U.S. state of Oklahoma. As of the 2020 census, the population was 10,146. Its county seat is Marietta. The county was created at statehood in 1907 and named for Overton Love, a prominent Chickasaw farmer, entrepreneur and politician.

For tourism purposes, the Oklahoma Department of Tourism includes Love County in 'Chickasaw Country'. Love County is also part of the Texoma region.

== History ==
The Louisiana Purchase, effected in 1803, included all of the present state of Oklahoma except the Panhandle. Explorers and traders began travelling extensively through the area, intending to find trade routes to Santa Fe. The Quapaw were the principal Native Americans living south of the Canadian River. The Quapaws ceded their land to the American government in 1818, and were replaced by the Choctaws in the early 1830s. The Chickasaws were assigned land in the middle of Choctaw territory during 1837–8.

Overton Love was one of the earliest Chickasaws who settled in present-day Love County. He was twenty years old when he arrived in Indian Territory from Mississippi in 1843. His settlement became known as Love's Valley (about 6 miles (9.7 km) east of the present town of Marietta). He later became one of the largest Chickasaw landowners and cattle raisers in the area, working 8,000 acres (3,200 ha) of Red River Bottomland. Eventually, he became a member of both houses of the Chickasaw National Council, a county and district judge, and a member of the Dawes Commission.

Prior to statehood, the area now known as Love County was part of Pickens County, Chickasaw Nation, Indian Territory. It had three incorporated towns: Marietta (the county seat, founded in 1887), Leon (established 1883) and Thackerville (established 1882). It also contained two unincorporated postal areas: Burneyville (post office established 1879) and Overbrook (post office established 1887). The settlement of Courtney at the mouth of Mud Creek was settled ca. 1872 by Henry D. Courtney.

== Geography ==
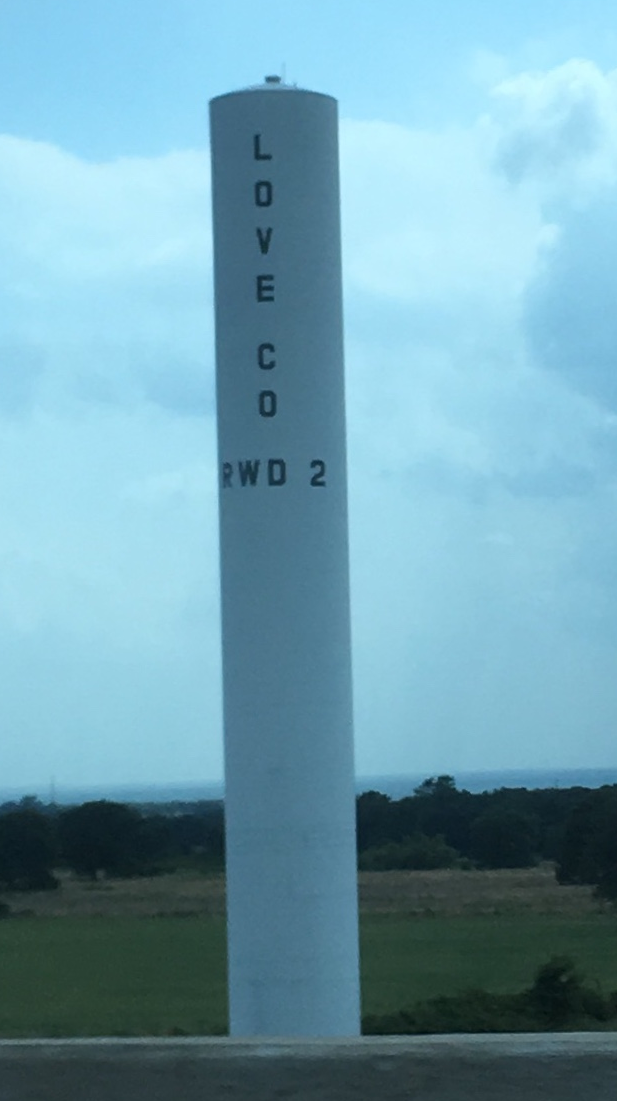
Water tower in Love County

According to the U.S. Census Bureau, the county has an area of 532 square miles (1,380 km^{2}), of which 514 square miles (1,330 km^{2}) is land and 18 square miles (47 km^{2}) (3.5%) is water. It is the fifth-smallest county in Oklahoma by land area.

Love County is within the Red River Plains physiographic region, with a rolling to hilly topography. The Red River and its tributaries Simon Creek, Walnut Bayou, Hickory Creek and Mud Creek drain the county. Lake Murray is on the northeastern border and Lake Texoma is on the southern border.

=== Adjacent counties ===
- Carter County (north)
- Marshall County (east)
- Cooke County, Texas (south)
- Montague County, Texas (southwest)
- Jefferson County (northwest)

== Demographics ==
Historical population
Census	Pop.	Note	%±
1910	10,236		—
1920	12,433		21.5%
1930	9,639		−22.5%
1940	11,433		18.6%
1950	7,721		−32.5%
1960	5,862		−24.1%
1970	5,637		−3.8%
1980	7,469		32.5%
1990	8,157		9.2%
2000	8,831		8.3%
2010	9,423		6.7%
2020	10,146		7.7%
2025 (est.)	10,780	▲	6.2%
U.S. Decennial Census; 1790-1960 1900-1990; 1990-2000 2010

=== 2020 census ===
As of the 2020 census, the county had a population of 10,146. Of the residents, 22.9% were under the age of 18 and 21.3% were 65 years of age or older; the median age was 41.9 years. For every 100 females there were 99.4 males, and for every 100 females age 18 and over there were 98.3 males.

The racial makeup of the county was 71.0% White, 2.0% Black or African American, 6.4% American Indian and Alaska Native, 0.7% Asian, 8.8% from some other race, and 11.1% from two or more races. Hispanic or Latino residents of any race comprised 16.6% of the population.

There were 3,976 households in the county, of which 30.6% had children under the age of 18 living with them and 25.2% had a female householder with no spouse or partner present. About 26.1% of all households were made up of individuals and 12.0% had someone living alone who was 65 years of age or older.

There were 4,703 housing units, of which 15.5% were vacant. Among occupied housing units, 70.4% were owner-occupied and 29.6% were renter-occupied. The homeowner vacancy rate was 2.3% and the rental vacancy rate was 14.6%.

=== 2000 census ===
As of the census of 2000, there were 8,831 people, 3,442 households, and 2,557 families residing in the county. The population density was 17 people per square mile (6.6 people/km^{2}). There were 4,066 housing units at an average density of 8 units per square mile (3.1/km^{2}). The racial makeup of the county was 84.15% White, 2.19% Black or African American, 6.41% Native American, 0.26% Asian, 0.01% Pacific Islander, 3.58% from other races, and 3.41% from two or more races. 7.01% of the population were Hispanic or Latino of any race.

There were 3,442 households, out of which 31.70% had children under the age of 18 living with them, 60.40% were married couples living together, 10.00% had a female householder with no husband present, and 25.70% were non-families. 22.90% of all households were made up of individuals, and 12.00% had someone living alone who was 65 years of age or older. The average household size was 2.54 and the average family size was 2.97.

In the county, the population was spread out, with 25.70% under the age of 18, 7.00% from 18 to 24, 25.40% from 25 to 44, 25.70% from 45 to 64, and 16.20% who were 65 years of age or older. The median age was 39 years. For every 100 females, there were 98.20 males. For every 100 females age 18 and over, there were 94.90 males.

The county's median household income was $32,558, and the median family income was $38,212. Males had a median income of $30,024 versus $20,578 for females. The county's per capita income was $16,648. About 8.80% of families and 11.80% of the population were below the poverty line, including 14.40% of those under age 18 and 13.80% of those age 65 or over.

== Politics ==
Voter Registration and Party Enrollment as of January 15, 2023
Party	Number of Voters	Percentage
Democratic	2,063	33.20%
Republican	3,007	48.39%
Others	1,111	17.88%
Total	6,214	100%

United States presidential election results for Love County, Oklahoma
Year	Republican		Democratic		Third party(ies)	
Year	No.	%	No.	%	No.	%
1908	413	27.51%	835	55.63%	253	16.86%
1912	199	14.65%	750	55.23%	409	30.12%
1916	266	15.15%	1,125	64.07%	365	20.79%
1920	711	28.16%	1,662	65.82%	152	6.02%
1924	479	17.56%	1,713	62.79%	536	19.65%
1928	843	39.93%	1,268	60.07%	0	0.00%
1932	187	7.16%	2,426	92.84%	0	0.00%
1936	440	16.38%	2,227	82.88%	20	0.74%
1940	687	21.58%	2,485	78.07%	11	0.35%
1944	446	18.54%	1,955	81.29%	4	0.17%
1948	249	10.20%	2,191	89.80%	0	0.00%
1952	806	29.01%	1,972	70.99%	0	0.00%
1956	731	29.39%	1,756	70.61%	0	0.00%
1960	932	39.24%	1,443	60.76%	0	0.00%
1964	663	26.25%	1,863	73.75%	0	0.00%
1968	677	28.52%	931	39.22%	766	32.27%
1972	1,407	66.75%	671	31.83%	30	1.42%
1976	846	30.45%	1,923	69.22%	9	0.32%
1980	1,449	47.12%	1,578	51.32%	48	1.56%
1984	1,833	57.12%	1,359	42.35%	17	0.53%
1988	1,361	41.66%	1,889	57.82%	17	0.52%
1992	922	25.06%	1,708	46.43%	1,049	28.51%
1996	1,224	37.05%	1,675	50.70%	405	12.26%
2000	1,807	53.59%	1,530	45.37%	35	1.04%
2004	2,295	59.87%	1,538	40.13%	0	0.00%
2008	2,589	67.32%	1,257	32.68%	0	0.00%
2012	2,436	70.20%	1,034	29.80%	0	0.00%
2016	2,922	77.12%	735	19.40%	132	3.48%
2020	3,305	81.08%	711	17.44%	60	1.47%
2024	3,510	82.39%	689	16.17%	61	1.43%

== Economy ==
Love County is home to Winstar World Casino, across the Red River from the Texas-Oklahoma border. The casino is operated by the Chickasaw Nation, and is the county's largest private employer. Agriculture and ranching have been important to the county economy since its inception. Leading non-agricultural employers include the Marietta Bakery, Murray Biscuit Company, Marietta Sportswear, Robertson Hams, Rapistan Systems, Earth Energy Systems, and the Joe Brown Company. The county also produces natural gas and its co-products propane and butanes.

== Education ==
The following school districts are in Love County:

- Turner Public Schools
- Marietta Public Schools
- Thackerville Public Schools
- Greenville Public Schools

== Transportation ==
=== Major highways ===
- Interstate 35
- U.S. Highway 77
- State Highway 32
- State Highway 76
- State Highway 77S
- State Highway 89
- State Highway 96

=== Airports ===
Public-use airports in Love County:

- Falconhead Airport (37K) in Burneyville
- McGehee Catfish Restaurant Airport (T40) in Marietta (closed)
- McGehee Catfish Restaurant Airport (4O2) in Marietta (closed)

== Communities ==
=== City ===
- Marietta (county seat)

=== Towns ===
- Leon
- Thackerville

=== Unincorporated communities ===
- Courtney
- Enville
- Hoxbar
- Jimtown
- Orr
- Overbrook
- Rubottom

== Other Population Divisions ==
=== Census-designated places ===
- Burneyville
- Greenville

=== Zip Codes ===
73448 73463 73456 73430 73453 73441

== See also ==
- National Register of Historic Places listings in Love County, Oklahoma
