= List of counties in Oklahoma =

Counties of Oklahoma
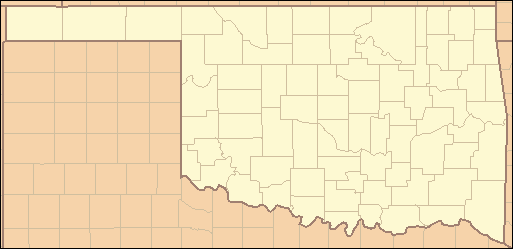
- Location: State of Oklahoma
- Number: 77
- Populations: 2,059 (Cimarron) – 822,125 (Oklahoma)
- Areas: 371 square miles (960 km^{2}) (Marshall) – 2,251 square miles (5,830 km^{2}) (Osage)
- Government: County government
- Subdivisions: Cities, towns, unincorporated communities, Indian reservations, census-designated places civil townships (Statehood until mid 1930s)

The U.S. state of Oklahoma has 77 counties. It is ranked 20th in size and 17th in the number of counties, between Mississippi with 82 counties and Arkansas with 75 counties.

Oklahoma originally had seven counties (Logan, Cleveland, Oklahoma, Canadian, Kingfisher, Payne, and Beaver) when it was first organized as the Oklahoma Territory. These counties were designated numerically, first through seventh. New counties added after this were designated by letters of the alphabet. The first seven counties were later renamed. The Oklahoma Constitutional Convention named all of the counties that were formed when Oklahoma entered statehood in 1907. Only two counties have been formed since then. Upon statehood, all Oklahoma counties allowed civil townships within their counties. A few years after statehood, a constitutional amendment allowed them to be abolished on a county-by-county basis, and by the mid-1930s, all Oklahoma counties had voted to do so.

According to the Oklahoma Constitution, a county can be disorganized if the sum of all taxable property is less than $2.5 million. If so, then a petition must be signed by one-fourth of the population and then a vote would occur. If a majority votes for dissolution of the county, the county will be combined with an adjacent county with the lowest valuation of taxable property.

The Federal Information Processing Standard (FIPS) code, which is used by the United States government to uniquely identify counties, is provided with each entry. The FIPS code for each county links to census data for that county.

The area in these tables is land area, and does not include water area.

Oklahoma's postal abbreviation is OK and its FIPS state code is 40.

== Alphabetical list ==
| County | FIPS code | County seat | Est. | Origin | Etymology | Density | Population | Area | Map |
|---|---|---|---|---|---|---|---|---|---|
| Adair County | 001 | Stilwell | November 16, 1907 | Cherokee lands | William Penn Adair, Cherokee tribal leader and Confederate colonel in the American Civil War | 34.42 | 19,828 | 576 sq mi (1,492 km^{2}) | State map highlighting Adair County |
| Alfalfa County | 003 | Cherokee | November 16, 1907 | Woods County | William H. "Alfalfa Bill" Murray, ninth Governor of Oklahoma; also the alfalfa crops grown there | 6.52 | 5,649 | 867 sq mi (2,246 km^{2}) | State map highlighting Alfalfa County |
| Atoka County | 005 | Atoka | November 16, 1907 | Choctaw lands | Captain Atoka, a noted Choctaw leader and signer of the Treaty of Dancing Rabbit Creek | 14.94 | 14,609 | 978 sq mi (2,533 km^{2}) | State map highlighting Atoka County |
| Beaver County | 007 | Beaver | May 2, 1890 | Seventh County (entire panhandle until 1907) | The Beaver River | 2.69 | 4,882 | 1,814 sq mi (4,698 km^{2}) | State map highlighting Beaver County |
| Beckham County | 009 | Sayre | November 16, 1907 | Greer County and Roger Mills County | J. C. W. Beckham, Governor of Kentucky | 24.57 | 22,159 | 902 sq mi (2,336 km^{2}) | State map highlighting Beckham County |
| Blaine County | 011 | Watonga | September 1, 1891 | Part of Cheyenne and Arapaho reservation. | James G. Blaine, Speaker of the U. S. House of Representatives, U.S. Senator and Secretary of State | 9.17 | 8,515 | 929 sq mi (2,406 km^{2}) | State map highlighting Blaine County |
| Bryan County | 013 | Durant | November 16, 1907 | Choctaw lands | William Jennings Bryan, Secretary of State, famous orator and three-time U.S. Presidential candidate | 56.51 | 51,367 | 909 sq mi (2,354 km^{2}) | State map highlighting Bryan County |
| Caddo County | 015 | Anadarko | July 8, 1901 | Indian Territory | From Indian word "Kaddi" meaning life or chief | 20.45 | 26,130 | 1,278 sq mi (3,310 km^{2}) | State map highlighting Caddo County |
| Canadian County | 017 | El Reno | May 2, 1890 | Part of Cheyenne and Arapaho reservation | The Canadian River. | 207.99 | 187,189 | 900 sq mi (2,331 km^{2}) | State map highlighting Canadian County |
| Carter County | 019 | Ardmore | November 16, 1907 | Pickens County, Chickasaw Nation | A prominent family of early settlers, including Charles D. Carter | 59.36 | 48,910 | 824 sq mi (2,134 km^{2}) | State map highlighting Carter County |
| Cherokee County | 021 | Tahlequah | November 16, 1907 | Originally settled by Cherokee Indians following the Trail of Tears | Cherokee Nation of Indians | 65.51 | 49,196 | 751 sq mi (1,945 km^{2}) | State map highlighting Cherokee County |
| Choctaw County | 023 | Hugo | November 16, 1907 | Choctaw Nation | Choctaw Nation of Indians | 18.16 | 14,059 | 774 sq mi (2,005 km^{2}) | State map highlighting Choctaw County |
| Cimarron County | 025 | Boise City | November 16, 1907 | Seventh County (entire panhandle until 1907) | Cimarron River | 1.12 | 2,059 | 1,835 sq mi (4,753 km^{2}) | State map highlighting Cimarron County |
| Cleveland County | 027 | Norman | May 2, 1890 | County 3 in Oklahoma Territory. | Grover Cleveland, twice President of the United States | 567.11 | 303,973 | 536 sq mi (1,388 km^{2}) | State map highlighting Cleveland County |
| Coal County | 029 | Coalgate | November 16, 1907 | Atoka County, Choctaw Nation | Coal, the primary economic product of the region at the time | 10.49 | 5,436 | 518 sq mi (1,342 km^{2}) | State map highlighting Coal County |
| Comanche County | 031 | Lawton | July 8, 1901 | Kiowa, Comanche, and Apache reservation | The name Comanche comes from the Ute word kɨmantsi meaning 'enemy, stranger'. | 114.27 | 122,158 | 1,069 sq mi (2,769 km^{2}) | State map highlighting Comanche County |
| Cotton County | 033 | Walters | November 18, 1912 | Lands of Quapaws, Choctaws, Chickasaws, Comanche Reservation, and Big Pasture | The principal economic base of the county, cotton | 8.53 | 5,432 | 637 sq mi (1,650 km^{2}) | State map highlighting Cotton County |
| Craig County | 035 | Vinita | November 16, 1907 | Cherokee Nation | Granville Craig, a prominent Cherokee planter | 19.08 | 14,518 | 761 sq mi (1,971 km^{2}) | State map highlighting Craig County |
| Creek County | 037 | Sapulpa | November 16, 1907 | Creek Nation | Creek Nation of Indians | 78.42 | 74,967 | 956 sq mi (2,476 km^{2}) | State map highlighting Creek County |
| Custer County | 039 | Arapaho | September 1, 1891 | Cheyenne-Arapaho Reservation | George A. Custer, United States Army cavalry commander during the Indian Wars | 28.55 | 28,175 | 987 sq mi (2,556 km^{2}) | State map highlighting Custer County |
| Delaware County | 041 | Jay | November 16, 1907 | Delaware District of Cherokee Nation | Delaware Nation of Indians | 56.56 | 41,910 | 741 sq mi (1,919 km^{2}) | State map highlighting Delaware County |
| Dewey County | 043 | Taloga | September 1, 1891 | Cheyenne-Arapaho Reservation | Admiral George Dewey, hero of the Spanish–American War | 4.21 | 4,207 | 1,000 sq mi (2,590 km^{2}) | State map highlighting Dewey County |
| Ellis County | 045 | Arnett | November 16, 1907 | Roger Mills and Woodward counties | Albert H. Ellis, member of the Oklahoma Constitutional Convention and first state Legislature | 2.94 | 3,613 | 1,229 sq mi (3,183 km^{2}) | State map highlighting Ellis County |
| Garfield County | 047 | Enid | September 16, 1893 | Cherokee Outlet | James Garfield, President of the United States | 58.39 | 61,779 | 1,058 sq mi (2,740 km^{2}) | State map highlighting Garfield County |
| Garvin County | 049 | Pauls Valley | November 16, 1907 | Chickasaw Nation | Samuel Garvin, a prominent Chickasaw Indian and local merchant | 32.60 | 26,377 | 809 sq mi (2,095 km^{2}) | State map highlighting Garvin County |
| Grady County | 051 | Chickasha | November 16, 1907 | Pickens County, Chickasaw Nation | Henry W. Grady, editor of the Atlanta Constitution | 53.70 | 59,128 | 1,101 sq mi (2,852 km^{2}) | State map highlighting Grady County |
| Grant County | 053 | Medford | September 16, 1893 | County L | Ulysses S. Grant, President of the United States | 4.06 | 4,067 | 1,001 sq mi (2,593 km^{2}) | State map highlighting Grant County |
| Greer County | 055 | Mangum | February 8, 1860 | Greer County, Texas | John Alexander Greer, Lieutenant Governor of Texas | 8.41 | 5,373 | 639 sq mi (1,655 km^{2}) | State map highlighting Greer County |
| Harmon County | 057 | Hollis | May 22, 1909 | Greer County | Judson Harmon, U.S. Attorney General and Governor of Ohio | 4.33 | 2,327 | 538 sq mi (1,393 km^{2}) | State map highlighting Harmon County |
| Harper County | 059 | Buffalo | November 16, 1907 | Woodward County | Oscar G. Harper, clerk of the Oklahoma Constitutional Convention | 3.05 | 3,172 | 1,039 sq mi (2,691 km^{2}) | State map highlighting Harper County |
| Haskell County | 061 | Stigler | November 16, 1907 | San Bois County of the Choctaw Nation | Charles N. Haskell, first Governor of Oklahoma | 20.43 | 11,787 | 577 sq mi (1,494 km^{2}) | State map highlighting Haskell County |
| Hughes County | 063 | Holdenville | November 16, 1907 | Choctaw Nation and Creek Nation lands | William C. Hughes, member of the Oklahoma Constitutional Convention | 16.67 | 13,455 | 807 sq mi (2,090 km^{2}) | State map highlighting Hughes County |
| Jackson County | 065 | Altus | November 16, 1907 | Greer County | Either Stonewall Jackson, Confederate general during the American Civil War or Andrew Jackson, seventh President of the United States | 30.84 | 24,764 | 803 sq mi (2,080 km^{2}) | State map highlighting Jackson County |
| Jefferson County | 067 | Waurika | November 16, 1907 | Comanche County and part of Chickasaw Nation | Thomas Jefferson, third President of the United States | 7.16 | 5,431 | 759 sq mi (1,966 km^{2}) | State map highlighting Jefferson County |
| Johnston County | 069 | Tishomingo | November 16, 1907 | Chickasaw Nation land | Douglas H. Johnston, Governor of the Chickasaw Nation | 16.20 | 10,448 | 645 sq mi (1,671 km^{2}) | State map highlighting Johnston County |
| Kay County | 071 | Newkirk | September 16, 1893 | County K, Cherokee Strip | Originally designated as county "K" | 47.32 | 43,490 | 919 sq mi (2,380 km^{2}) | State map highlighting Kay County |
| Kingfisher County | 073 | Kingfisher | May 2, 1890 | Unassigned Lands | Either for the kingfisher bird or King David Fisher, an early settler in the area | 17.49 | 15,795 | 903 sq mi (2,339 km^{2}) | State map highlighting Kingfisher County |
| Kiowa County | 075 | Hobart | July 8, 1901 | Kiowa-Comanche-Apache Indian Reservations | Kiowa Nation of Indians | 8.06 | 8,181 | 1,015 sq mi (2,629 km^{2}) | State map highlighting Kiowa County |
| Latimer County | 077 | Wilburton | November 16, 1907 | Choctaw Nation land | James S. Latimer, member of the Oklahoma Constitutional Convention | 13.36 | 9,645 | 722 sq mi (1,870 km^{2}) | State map highlighting Latimer County |
| LeFlore County | 079 | Poteau | November 16, 1907 | Choctaw Nation | A Choctaw Indian family of French descent | 31.65 | 50,196 | 1,586 sq mi (4,108 km^{2}) | State map highlighting LeFlore County |
| Lincoln County | 081 | Chandler | September 1, 1891 | County A in Oklahoma Territory | Abraham Lincoln, the sixteenth president of the United States | 36.79 | 35,278 | 959 sq mi (2,484 km^{2}) | State map highlighting Lincoln County |
| Logan County | 083 | Guthrie | May 2, 1890 | County 1 in Oklahoma Territory | John A. Logan, American Civil War general | 74.46 | 55,473 | 745 sq mi (1,930 km^{2}) | State map highlighting Logan County |
| Love County | 085 | Marietta | November 16, 1907 | Pickens County, Chickasaw Nation, Indian Territory | Overton Love, Chickasaw judge and prominent landowner | 20.93 | 10,780 | 515 sq mi (1,334 km^{2}) | State map highlighting Love County |
| Major County | 093 | Fairview | November 16, 1907 | Woods County, Oklahoma Territory | John C. Major, member of the Oklahoma Constitutional Convention | 7.87 | 7,536 | 957 sq mi (2,479 km^{2}) | State map highlighting Major County |
| Marshall County | 095 | Madill | November 16, 1907 | Pickens County, Chickasaw Nation, Indian Territory | The maiden name of a member of the Constitutional Convention's mother | 43.81 | 16,255 | 371 sq mi (961 km^{2}) | State map highlighting Marshall County |
| Mayes County | 097 | Pryor | November 16, 1907 | Saline District, Cherokee Nation | Cherokee leader Samuel Houston Mayes | 61.61 | 40,416 | 656 sq mi (1,699 km^{2}) | State map highlighting Mayes County |
| McClain County | 087 | Purcell | November 16, 1907 | Chickasaw Nation land | Charles M. McClain, member of the Oklahoma Constitutional Convention | 87.10 | 49,647 | 570 sq mi (1,476 km^{2}) | State map highlighting McClain County |
| McCurtain County | 089 | Idabel | November 16, 1907 | | The McCurtain family, a prominent Choctaw landowning group | 16.60 | 30,744 | 1,852 sq mi (4,797 km^{2}) | State map highlighting McCurtain County |
| McIntosh County | 091 | Eufaula | November 16, 1907 | Creek Nation land | The McIntosh family, a prominent Creek landowning group | 31.87 | 19,758 | 620 sq mi (1,606 km^{2}) | State map highlighting McIntosh County |
| Murray County | 099 | Sulphur | November 16, 1907 | Chickasaw Nation land | Governor of Oklahoma William H. "Alfalfa Bill" Murray | 33.03 | 13,805 | 418 sq mi (1,083 km^{2}) | State map highlighting Murray County |
| Muskogee County | 101 | Muskogee | November 16, 1907 | Muskogee District of Creek Nation and part of Illinois and Canadian Districts of Cherokee Nation | Muskogee Nation of Indians | 81.95 | 66,708 | 814 sq mi (2,108 km^{2}) | State map highlighting Muskogee County |
| Noble County | 103 | Perry | September 16, 1893 | County P in Oklahoma Territory. | U.S. Secretary of the Interior John Willock Noble | 14.89 | 10,899 | 732 sq mi (1,896 km^{2}) | State map highlighting Noble County |
| Nowata County | 105 | Nowata | November 16, 1907 | Cooweescoowee District of Cherokee Nation | The town of Nowata, Oklahoma. The exact origin is unknown, but the two most common stories are that railroad surveyors used the Delaware word noweta for welcome or that a sign was posted indicating that local springs had no water: No wata | 16.85 | 9,522 | 565 sq mi (1,463 km^{2}) | State map highlighting Nowata County |
| Okfuskee County | 107 | Okemah | November 16, 1907 | Creek Nation land | Creek town of the same name in Cleburn County, Alabama | 18.32 | 11,451 | 625 sq mi (1,619 km^{2}) | State map highlighting Okfuskee County |
| Oklahoma County | 109 | Oklahoma City | May 2, 1890 | Unassigned Lands in Indian Territory, the County 2 in Oklahoma Territory | From two Choctaw words okla and humma, meaning people and red | 1,159.56 | 822,125 | 709 sq mi (1,836 km^{2}) | State map highlighting Oklahoma County |
| Okmulgee County | 111 | Okmulgee | November 16, 1907 | Creek Nation land | Creek word meaning boiling water | 53.43 | 37,241 | 697 sq mi (1,805 km^{2}) | State map highlighting Okmulgee County |
| Osage County | 113 | Pawhuska | November 16, 1907 | Coterminous with Osage Reservation | The Osage Indian Reservation, inhabited by the Osage Nation | 20.79 | 46,794 | 2,251 sq mi (5,830 km^{2}) | State map highlighting Osage County |
| Ottawa County | 115 | Miami | November 16, 1907 | Multiple tribal reservations in Indian Territory. | Ottawa Native American people | 64.62 | 30,438 | 471 sq mi (1,220 km^{2}) | State map highlighting Ottawa County |
| Pawnee County | 117 | Pawnee | September 16, 1893 | Cherokee Outlet, then County Q in Oklahoma Territory | The Skidi Pawnee Native American people | 28.12 | 16,029 | 570 sq mi (1,476 km^{2}) | State map highlighting Pawnee County |
| Payne County | 119 | Stillwater | May 2, 1890 | County 6 in Oklahoma Territory in 1889, renamed to Payne County in 1907 | David L. Payne, the key figure in opening Oklahoma to white settlement | 122.29 | 83,889 | 686 sq mi (1,777 km^{2}) | State map highlighting Payne County |
| Pittsburg County | 121 | McAlester | November 16, 1907 | Choctaw Nation land | Pittsburgh, Pennsylvania | 33.17 | 43,320 | 1,306 sq mi (3,383 km^{2}) | State map highlighting Pittsburg County |
| Pontotoc County | 123 | Ada | November 16, 1907 | Chickasaw Nation | Pontotoc is a Chickasaw word meaning cat tails growing on the prairie | 53.51 | 38,528 | 720 sq mi (1,865 km^{2}) | State map highlighting Pontotoc County |
| Pottawatomie County | 125 | Shawnee | September 1, 1891 | Creek Nation and Seminole Nation lands. | The Pottawatomie Native American people | 95.31 | 75,102 | 788 sq mi (2,041 km^{2}) | State map highlighting Pottawatomie County |
| Pushmataha County | 127 | Antlers | November 16, 1907 | Pushmataha District of the Choctaw Nation | The Pushmataha District of the Choctaw Nation | 7.74 | 10,807 | 1,397 sq mi (3,618 km^{2}) | State map highlighting Pushmataha County |
| Roger Mills County | 129 | Cheyenne | September 1, 1891 | County F in Oklahoma Territory | U.S. Senator Roger Q. Mills | 2.85 | 3,259 | 1,142 sq mi (2,958 km^{2}) | State map highlighting Roger Mills County |
| Rogers County | 131 | Claremore | November 16, 1907 | Cooweescoowee District, Cherokee Nation, Indian Territory | Clem V. Rogers, a member of the Oklahoma Constitutional Convention and the father of entertainer Will Rogers | 151.40 | 102,197 | 675 sq mi (1,748 km^{2}) | State map highlighting Rogers County |
| Seminole County | 133 | Wewoka | November 16, 1907 | Seminole Nation | The Seminole Native American people | 37.09 | 23,441 | 632 sq mi (1,637 km^{2}) | State map highlighting Seminole County |
| Sequoyah County | 135 | Sallisaw | November 16, 1907 | Sequoyah District and part of Illinois District, Cherokee Nation | Sequoyah (George Guess), invented the Cherokee syllabary | 60.60 | 40,842 | 674 sq mi (1,746 km^{2}) | State map highlighting Sequoyah County |
| Stephens County | 137 | Duncan | November 16, 1907 | Comanche County, Oklahoma Territory | John Hall Stephens, a Texas congressman and advocate of Oklahoma statehood | 50.52 | 44,310 | 877 sq mi (2,271 km^{2}) | State map highlighting Stephens County |
| Texas County | 139 | Guymon | November 16, 1907 | Seventh County (entire panhandle until 1907) | The neighboring U.S. state of Texas | 9.98 | 20,322 | 2,037 sq mi (5,276 km^{2}) | State map highlighting Texas County |
| Tillman County | 141 | Frederick | November 16, 1907 | Comanche County, Oklahoma | U.S. Senator Benjamin Tillman of South Carolina | 7.78 | 6,780 | 872 sq mi (2,258 km^{2}) | State map highlighting Tillman County |
| Tulsa County | 143 | Tulsa | November 16, 1907 | Cherokee Nation and Creek Nation land. | Derived from Tulsey Town, Alabama, an old Creek settlement. | 1,225.93 | 698,782 | 570 sq mi (1,476 km^{2}) | State map highlighting Tulsa County |
| Wagoner County | 145 | Wagoner | November 16, 1907 | Cherokee Nation land | Bailey P. Waggoner, attorney of the Missouri Pacific Railroad, which established the town of Wagoner | 165.65 | 93,263 | 563 sq mi (1,458 km^{2}) | State map highlighting Wagoner County |
| Washington County | 147 | Bartlesville | November 16, 1907 | Cooweescoowee District of Cherokee Nation. | First President of the United States George Washington | 129.59 | 54,037 | 417 sq mi (1,080 km^{2}) | State map highlighting Washington County |
| Washita County | 149 | New Cordell | September 1, 1891 | County H in Oklahoma Territory | The Washita River | 10.84 | 10,884 | 1,004 sq mi (2,600 km^{2}) | State map highlighting Washita County |
| Woods County | 151 | Alva | September 16, 1893 | County M in Oklahoma Territory. | Kansas populist and territorial legislator Samuel Newitt Wood | 6.56 | 8,443 | 1,287 sq mi (3,333 km^{2}) | State map highlighting Woods County |
| Woodward County | 153 | Woodward | September 16, 1893 | County N in Oklahoma Territory | Santa Fe Railroad director B. W. Woodward | 15.96 | 19,827 | 1,242 sq mi (3,217 km^{2}) | State map highlighting Woodward County |

== Racial / Ethnic Profile of counties in Oklahoma (2020 Census) ==
Racial / Ethnic Profile of counties in Oklahoma (2020 Census)
Following is a table of counties in Oklahoma by race/ethnicity. The majority racial/ethnic group is coded per the key below.

| Majority minority with no dominant group |
| Majority White |
| Majority Black |
| Majority Hispanic |
| Majority Asian |
| Majority Native American |

Racial and ethnic composition of counties in Oklahoma (2020 Census) (NH = Non-Hispanic) Note: the US Census treats Hispanic/Latino as an ethnic category. This table excludes Latinos from the racial categories and assigns them to a separate category. Hispanics/Latinos may be of any race.
| County | Location of County | Total Population | White alone (NH) | % | Black or African American alone (NH) | % | Native American or Alaska Native alone (NH) | % | Asian alone (NH) | % | Pacific Islander alone (NH) | % | Other race alone (NH) | % | Mixed race or Multiracial (NH) | % | Hispanic or Latino (any race) | % |
|---|---|---|---|---|---|---|---|---|---|---|---|---|---|---|---|---|---|---|
| Adair | | 19,495 | 7,464 | 38.29% | 40 | 0.21% | 8,240 | 42.27% | 162 | 0.83% | 12 | 0.06% | 12 | 0.06% | 2,313 | 11.86% | 1,252 | 6.42% |
| Alfalfa | | 5,699 | 4,702 | 82.51% | 229 | 4.02% | 194 | 3.40% | 7 | 0.12% | 0 | 0.00% | 7 | 0.12% | 281 | 4.93% | 279 | 4.90% |
| Atoka | | 14,143 | 9,303 | 65.78% | 565 | 3.99% | 2,192 | 15.50% | 49 | 0.35% | 4 | 0.03% | 58 | 0.41% | 1,424 | 10.07% | 548 | 3.87% |
| Beaver | | 5,049 | 3,497 | 69.26% | 3 | 0.06% | 29 | 0.57% | 11 | 0.22% | 6 | 0.12% | 3 | 0.06% | 196 | 3.88% | 1,304 | 25.83% |
| Beckham | | 22,410 | 16,526 | 73.74% | 1,119 | 4.99% | 770 | 3.44% | 128 | 0.57% | 12 | 0.05% | 38 | 0.17% | 1,133 | 5.06% | 2,684 | 11.98% |
| Blaine | | 8,735 | 6,248 | 71.53% | 248 | 2.84% | 650 | 7.44% | 26 | 0.30% | 5 | 0.06% | 12 | 0.14% | 561 | 6.42% | 985 | 11.28% |
| Bryan | | 46,067 | 30,076 | 65.29% | 715 | 1.55% | 6,574 | 14.27% | 285 | 0.62% | 14 | 0.03% | 73 | 0.16% | 4,902 | 10.64% | 3,428 | 7.44% |
| Caddo | | 26,945 | 14,580 | 54.11% | 646 | 2.40% | 5,320 | 19.74% | 63 | 0.23% | 13 | 0.05% | 29 | 0.11% | 1,959 | 7.27% | 4,335 | 16.09% |
| Canadian | | 154,405 | 107,898 | 69.88% | 5,307 | 3.44% | 6,312 | 4.09% | 4,782 | 3.10% | 114 | 0.07% | 478 | 0.31% | 13,137 | 8.51% | 16,377 | 10.61% |
| Carter | | 48,003 | 31,227 | 65.05% | 2,824 | 5.88% | 4,203 | 8.76% | 587 | 1.22% | 44 | 0.09% | 655 | 1.36% | 4,841 | 10.08% | 3,622 | 7.55% |
| Cherokee | | 47,078 | 20,231 | 42.97% | 519 | 1.10% | 15,745 | 33.44% | 308 | 0.65% | 21 | 0.04% | 139 | 0.30% | 6,678 | 14.18% | 3,437 | 7.30% |
| Choctaw | | 14,204 | 8,114 | 57.12% | 1,371 | 9.65% | 2,502 | 17.61% | 29 | 0.20% | 4 | 0.03% | 57 | 0.40% | 1,532 | 10.79% | 595 | 4.19% |
| Cimarron | | 2,296 | 1,647 | 71.73% | 1 | 0.04% | 4 | 0.17% | 0 | 0.00% | 0 | 0.00% | 7 | 0.30% | 74 | 3.22% | 563 | 24.52% |
| Cleveland | | 295,528 | 195,085 | 66.01% | 14,613 | 4.94% | 12,133 | 4.11% | 12,697 | 4.30% | 237 | 0.08% | 1,866 | 0.63% | 28,585 | 9.67% | 30,312 | 10.26% |
| Coal | | 5,266 | 3,371 | 64.01% | 23 | 0.44% | 1,009 | 19.16% | 15 | 0.28% | 0 | 0.00% | 48 | 0.91% | 602 | 11.43% | 198 | 3.76% |
| Comanche | | 121,125 | 64,465 | 53.22% | 18,871 | 15.58% | 6,381 | 5.27% | 2,994 | 2.47% | 803 | 0.66% | 526 | 0.43% | 10,440 | 8.62% | 16,645 | 13.74% |
| Cotton | | 5,527 | 4,098 | 74.15% | 68 | 1.23% | 481 | 8.70% | 28 | 0.51% | 9 | 0.16% | 9 | 0.16% | 473 | 8.56% | 361 | 6.53% |
| Craig | | 14,107 | 8,438 | 59.81% | 368 | 2.61% | 2,833 | 20.08% | 75 | 0.53% | 1 | 0.01% | 31 | 0.22% | 1,934 | 13.71% | 427 | 3.03% |
| Creek | | 71,754 | 51,528 | 71.81% | 1,452 | 2.02% | 7,002 | 9.76% | 290 | 0.40% | 67 | 0.09% | 141 | 0.20% | 7,862 | 10.96% | 3,412 | 4.76% |
| Custer | | 28,513 | 18,483 | 64.82% | 783 | 2.75% | 1,702 | 5.97% | 294 | 1.03% | 1 | 0.00% | 57 | 0.20% | 1,809 | 6.34% | 5,384 | 18.88% |
| Delaware | | 40,397 | 25,019 | 61.93% | 116 | 0.29% | 8,491 | 21.02% | 471 | 1.17% | 36 | 0.09% | 85 | 0.21% | 4,558 | 11.28% | 1,621 | 4.01% |
| Dewey | | 4,484 | 3,723 | 83.03% | 7 | 0.16% | 247 | 5.51% | 4 | 0.09% | 2 | 0.04% | 4 | 0.09% | 237 | 5.29% | 260 | 5.80% |
| Ellis | | 3,749 | 3,148 | 83.97% | 16 | 0.43% | 57 | 1.52% | 9 | 0.24% | 0 | 0.00% | 3 | 0.08% | 176 | 4.69% | 340 | 9.07% |
| Garfield | | 62,846 | 42,939 | 68.32% | 1,661 | 2.64% | 1,307 | 2.08% | 685 | 1.09% | 2,920 | 4.65% | 150 | 0.24% | 4,202 | 6.69% | 8,982 | 14.29% |
| Garvin | | 25,656 | 18,200 | 70.94% | 545 | 2.12% | 2,066 | 8.05% | 118 | 0.46% | 8 | 0.03% | 39 | 0.15% | 2,228 | 8.68% | 2,452 | 9.56% |
| Grady | | 54,795 | 41,842 | 76.36% | 1,281 | 2.34% | 2,897 | 5.29% | 200 | 0.36% | 38 | 0.07% | 112 | 0.20% | 4,905 | 8.95% | 3,520 | 6.42% |
| Grant | | 4,169 | 3,632 | 87.12% | 44 | 1.06% | 79 | 1.89% | 12 | 0.29% | 8 | 0.19% | 15 | 0.36% | 195 | 4.68% | 184 | 4.41% |
| Greer | | 5,491 | 3,996 | 72.77% | 352 | 6.41% | 167 | 3.04% | 7 | 0.13% | 1 | 0.02% | 15 | 0.27% | 288 | 5.24% | 665 | 12.11% |
| Harmon | | 2,488 | 1,403 | 56.39% | 149 | 5.99% | 53 | 2.13% | 7 | 0.28% | 0 | 0.00% | 0 | 0.00% | 136 | 5.47% | 740 | 29.74% |
| Harper | | 3,272 | 2,375 | 72.59% | 4 | 0.12% | 24 | 0.73% | 0 | 0.00% | 0 | 0.00% | 2 | 0.06% | 134 | 4.10% | 733 | 22.40% |
| Haskell | | 11,561 | 7,697 | 66.58% | 64 | 0.55% | 2,153 | 18.62% | 21 | 0.18% | 7 | 0.06% | 26 | 0.22% | 1,064 | 9.20% | 529 | 4.58% |
| Hughes | | 13,367 | 8,073 | 60.40% | 728 | 5.45% | 2,513 | 18.80% | 38 | 0.28% | 14 | 0.10% | 38 | 0.28% | 1,208 | 9.04% | 755 | 5.65% |
| Jackson | | 24,785 | 14,883 | 60.05% | 1,614 | 6.51% | 382 | 1.54% | 320 | 1.29% | 77 | 0.31% | 57 | 0.23% | 1,515 | 6.11% | 5,937 | 23.95% |
| Jefferson | | 5,337 | 3,993 | 74.82% | 27 | 0.51% | 258 | 4.83% | 30 | 0.56% | 5 | 0.09% | 15 | 0.28% | 425 | 7.96% | 584 | 10.94% |
| Johnston | | 10,272 | 6,735 | 65.57% | 236 | 2.30% | 1,582 | 15.40% | 52 | 0.51% | 5 | 0.05% | 57 | 0.55% | 1,024 | 9.97% | 581 | 5.66% |
| Kay | | 43,700 | 30,728 | 70.32% | 856 | 1.96% | 4,127 | 9.44% | 253 | 0.58% | 274 | 0.63% | 75 | 0.17% | 3,735 | 8.55% | 3,652 | 8.36% |
| Kingfisher | | 15,184 | 10,985 | 72.35% | 170 | 1.12% | 417 | 2.75% | 45 | 0.30% | 0 | 0.00% | 26 | 0.17% | 786 | 5.18% | 2,755 | 18.14% |
| Kiowa | | 8,509 | 6,149 | 72.26% | 314 | 3.69% | 504 | 5.92% | 47 | 0.55% | 3 | 0.04% | 17 | 0.20% | 522 | 6.13% | 953 | 11.20% |
| Latimer | | 9,444 | 5,818 | 61.61% | 42 | 0.44% | 2,216 | 23.46% | 67 | 0.71% | 5 | 0.05% | 16 | 0.17% | 936 | 9.91% | 344 | 3.64% |
| Le Flore | | 48,129 | 31,920 | 66.32% | 841 | 1.75% | 6,890 | 14.32% | 292 | 0.61% | 32 | 0.07% | 50 | 0.10% | 4,531 | 9.41% | 3,573 | 7.42% |
| Lincoln | | 33,458 | 26,146 | 78.15% | 592 | 1.77% | 2,282 | 6.82% | 114 | 0.34% | 13 | 0.04% | 78 | 0.23% | 3,096 | 9.25% | 1,137 | 3.40% |
| Logan | | 49,555 | 36,060 | 72.77% | 3,201 | 6.46% | 1,613 | 3.25% | 260 | 0.52% | 31 | 0.06% | 238 | 0.48% | 4,149 | 8.37% | 4,003 | 8.08% |
| Love | | 10,146 | 6,806 | 67.08% | 196 | 1.93% | 613 | 6.04% | 72 | 0.71% | 0 | 0.00% | 63 | 0.62% | 711 | 7.01% | 1,685 | 16.61% |
| McClain | | 41,662 | 30,701 | 73.69% | 346 | 0.83% | 2,653 | 6.37% | 209 | 0.50% | 36 | 0.09% | 100 | 0.24% | 3,918 | 9.40% | 3,699 | 8.88% |
| McCurtain | | 30,814 | 18,159 | 58.93% | 2,538 | 8.24% | 4,290 | 13.92% | 124 | 0.40% | 460 | 1.49% | 40 | 0.13% | 3,309 | 10.74% | 1,894 | 6.15% |
| McIntosh | | 18,941 | 12,644 | 66.75% | 547 | 2.89% | 3,163 | 16.70% | 68 | 0.36% | 4 | 0.02% | 56 | 0.30% | 1,968 | 10.39% | 491 | 2.59% |
| Major | | 7,782 | 6,479 | 83.26% | 15 | 0.19% | 131 | 1.68% | 40 | 0.51% | 0 | 0.00% | 9 | 0.12% | 324 | 4.16% | 784 | 10.07% |
| Marshall | | 15,312 | 9,749 | 63.67% | 169 | 1.10% | 1,413 | 9.23% | 44 | 0.29% | 4 | 0.03% | 85 | 0.56% | 1,243 | 8.12% | 2,605 | 17.01% |
| Mayes | | 39,046 | 23,516 | 60.23% | 180 | 0.46% | 8,095 | 20.73% | 192 | 0.49% | 27 | 0.07% | 50 | 0.13% | 5,611 | 14.37% | 1,375 | 3.52% |
| Murray | | 13,904 | 9,446 | 67.94% | 153 | 1.10% | 1,936 | 13.92% | 45 | 0.32% | 19 | 0.14% | 16 | 0.12% | 1,363 | 9.80% | 926 | 6.66% |
| Muskogee | | 66,339 | 34,857 | 52.54% | 6,545 | 9.87% | 11,747 | 17.71% | 512 | 0.77% | 39 | 0.06% | 165 | 0.25% | 7,975 | 12.02% | 4,499 | 6.78% |
| Noble | | 10,924 | 8,414 | 77.02% | 145 | 1.33% | 953 | 8.72% | 47 | 0.43% | 0 | 0.00% | 30 | 0.27% | 915 | 8.38% | 420 | 3.84% |
| Nowata | | 9,320 | 5,812 | 62.36% | 104 | 1.12% | 1,562 | 16.76% | 5 | 0.05% | 5 | 0.05% | 8 | 0.09% | 1,583 | 16.98% | 241 | 2.59% |
| Okfuskee | | 11,310 | 6,590 | 58.27% | 694 | 6.14% | 2,559 | 22.63% | 32 | 0.28% | 0 | 0.00% | 33 | 0.29% | 1,060 | 9.37% | 342 | 3.02% |
| Oklahoma | | 796,292 | 407,986 | 51.24% | 117,957 | 14.81% | 22,034 | 2.77% | 27,823 | 3.49% | 1,168 | 0.15% | 3,151 | 0.40% | 62,675 | 7.87% | 153,498 | 19.28% |
| Okmulgee | | 36,706 | 21,599 | 58.84% | 2,742 | 7.47% | 5,947 | 16.20% | 160 | 0.44% | 22 | 0.06% | 82 | 0.22% | 4,446 | 12.11% | 1,708 | 4.65% |
| Osage | | 45,818 | 27,443 | 59.90% | 4,796 | 10.47% | 6,405 | 13.98% | 128 | 0.28% | 19 | 0.04% | 96 | 0.21% | 5,059 | 11.04% | 1,872 | 4.09% |
| Ottawa | | 30,285 | 18,850 | 62.24% | 287 | 0.95% | 5,563 | 18.37% | 154 | 0.51% | 231 | 0.76% | 50 | 0.17% | 3,442 | 11.37% | 1,708 | 5.64% |
| Pawnee | | 15,553 | 11,530 | 74.13% | 73 | 0.47% | 1,927 | 12.39% | 49 | 0.32% | 0 | 0.00% | 42 | 0.27% | 1,465 | 9.42% | 467 | 3.00% |
| Payne | | 81,646 | 58,926 | 72.17% | 3,123 | 3.83% | 3,613 | 4.43% | 2,662 | 3.26% | 53 | 0.06% | 296 | 0.36% | 7,600 | 9.31% | 5,373 | 6.58% |
| Pittsburg | | 43,773 | 28,388 | 64.85% | 1,227 | 2.80% | 6,388 | 14.59% | 280 | 0.64% | 35 | 0.08% | 62 | 0.14% | 5,127 | 11.71% | 2,266 | 5.18% |
| Pontotoc | | 38,065 | 22,703 | 59.64% | 861 | 2.26% | 6,842 | 17.97% | 372 | 0.98% | 13 | 0.03% | 98 | 0.26% | 4,968 | 13.05% | 2,208 | 5.80% |
| Pottawatomie | | 72,454 | 49,158 | 67.85% | 2,194 | 3.03% | 8,693 | 12.00% | 495 | 0.68% | 39 | 0.05% | 171 | 0.24% | 7,416 | 10.24% | 4,288 | 5.92% |
| Pushmataha | | 10,812 | 7,382 | 68.28% | 66 | 0.61% | 1,830 | 16.93% | 52 | 0.48% | 0 | 0.00% | 23 | 0.21% | 1,083 | 10.02% | 376 | 3.48% |
| Roger Mills | | 3,442 | 2,860 | 83.09% | 5 | 0.15% | 106 | 3.08% | 5 | 0.15% | 1 | 0.03% | 1 | 0.03% | 208 | 6.04% | 256 | 7.44% |
| Rogers | | 95,240 | 62,387 | 65.51% | 1,103 | 1.16% | 12,109 | 12.71% | 1,676 | 1.76% | 39 | 0.04% | 286 | 0.30% | 12,383 | 13.00% | 5,257 | 5.52% |
| Seminole | | 23,556 | 14,109 | 59.90% | 920 | 3.91% | 4,411 | 18.73% | 72 | 0.31% | 8 | 0.03% | 89 | 0.38% | 2,771 | 11.76% | 1,176 | 4.99% |
| Sequoyah | | 39,281 | 22,497 | 57.27% | 585 | 1.49% | 8,954 | 22.79% | 288 | 0.73% | 14 | 0.04% | 110 | 0.28% | 5,107 | 13.00% | 1,726 | 4.39% |
| Stephens | | 42,848 | 32,383 | 75.58% | 799 | 1.86% | 2,034 | 4.75% | 244 | 0.57% | 13 | 0.03% | 143 | 0.33% | 3,780 | 8.82% | 3,452 | 8.06% |
| Texas | | 21,384 | 8,263 | 38.64% | 975 | 4.56% | 162 | 0.76% | 448 | 2.10% | 0 | 0.00% | 68 | 0.32% | 645 | 3.02% | 10,823 | 50.61% |
| Tillman | | 6,968 | 3,982 | 57.15% | 474 | 6.80% | 191 | 2.74% | 26 | 0.37% | 0 | 0.00% | 25 | 0.36% | 347 | 4.98% | 1,923 | 27.60% |
| Tulsa | | 669,279 | 371,913 | 55.57% | 66,182 | 9.89% | 36,612 | 5.47% | 24,846 | 3.71% | 1,033 | 0.15% | 2,355 | 0.35% | 66,289 | 9.90% | 100,049 | 14.95% |
| Wagoner | | 80,981 | 52,734 | 65.12% | 2,638 | 3.26% | 8,073 | 9.97% | 1,405 | 1.73% | 29 | 0.04% | 225 | 0.28% | 9,740 | 12.03% | 6,137 | 7.58% |
| Washington | | 52,455 | 35,208 | 67.12% | 1,322 | 2.52% | 5,194 | 9.90% | 974 | 1.86% | 10 | 0.02% | 121 | 0.23% | 6,266 | 11.95% | 3,360 | 6.41% |
| Washita | | 10,924 | 8,818 | 80.72% | 77 | 0.70% | 303 | 2.77% | 22 | 0.20% | 0 | 0.00% | 17 | 0.16% | 707 | 6.47% | 980 | 8.97% |
| Woods | | 8,624 | 7,025 | 81.46% | 228 | 2.64% | 240 | 2.78% | 74 | 0.86% | 1 | 0.01% | 15 | 0.17% | 428 | 4.96% | 613 | 7.11% |
| Woodward | | 20,470 | 15,426 | 75.36% | 351 | 1.71% | 543 | 2.65% | 126 | 0.62% | 0 | 0.00% | 57 | 0.28% | 961 | 4.69% | 3,006 | 14.68% |

== See also ==
- Oklahoma
- County (United States)
- List of Oklahoma counties by socioeconomic factors
- Lists of U.S. county name etymologies
