= Marietta, Oklahoma =

City in Oklahoma, United States

- City
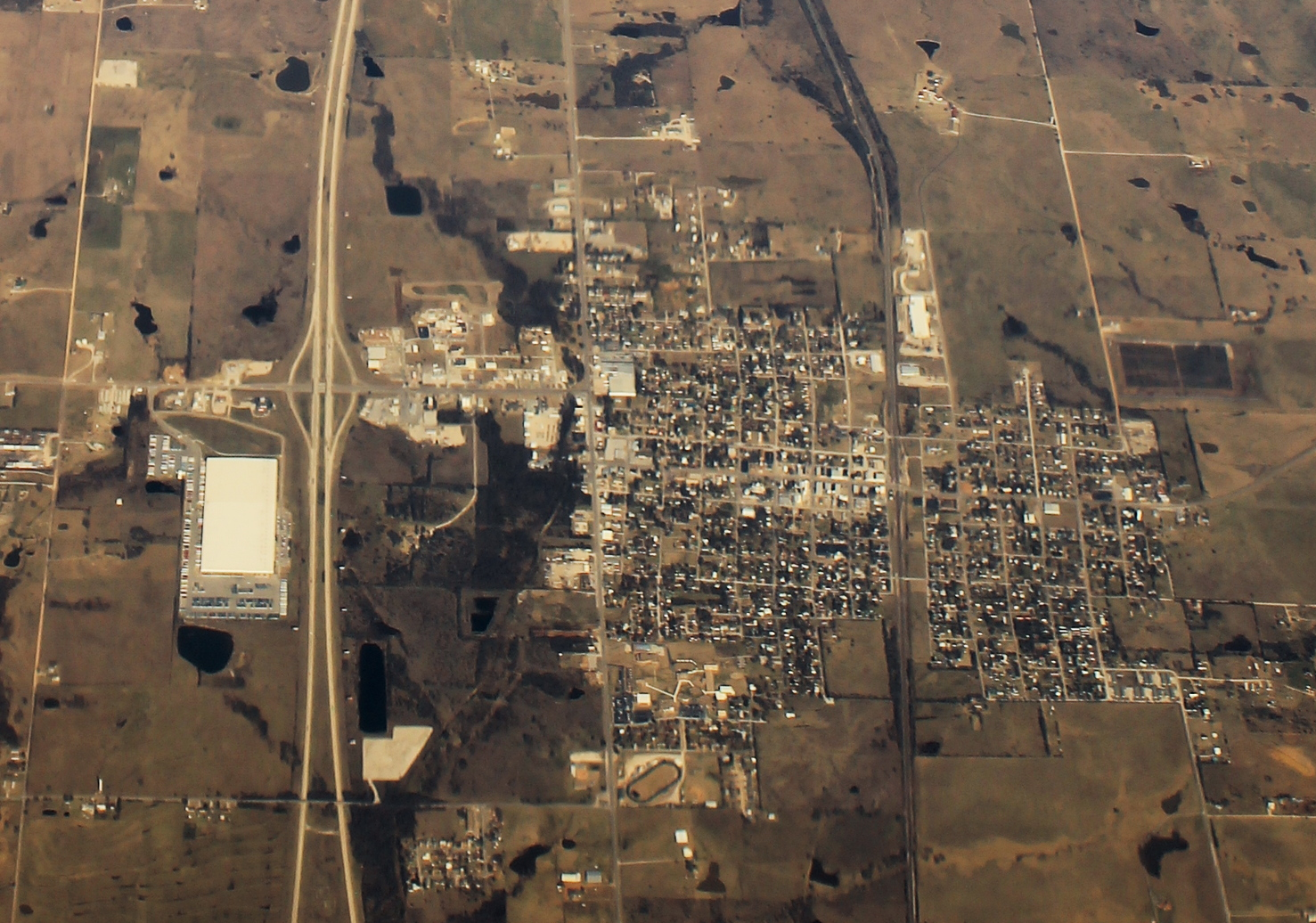
- Aerial view of Marietta
- Motto: "Gateway To Lake Country"
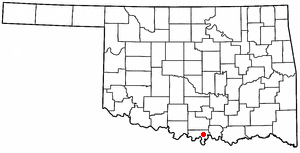
- Location of Marietta, Oklahoma
- Coordinates: 33°56′08″N 97°07′29″W
- Country: United States
- State: Oklahoma
- County: Love

Area
  - Total: 2.59 sq mi (6.71 km^{2})
  - Land: 2.58 sq mi (6.69 km^{2})
  - Water: 0.0077 sq mi (0.02 km^{2})
- Elevation: 837 ft (255 m)

Population (2020)
  - Total: 2,719
  - Density: 1,050/sq mi (406/km^{2})
- Time zone: UTC-6 (Central (CST))
  - Summer (DST): UTC-5 (CDT)
- ZIP code: 73448
- Area code: 580
- FIPS code: 40-46500
- GNIS feature ID: 2411034
- Website: www.mariettaok.city

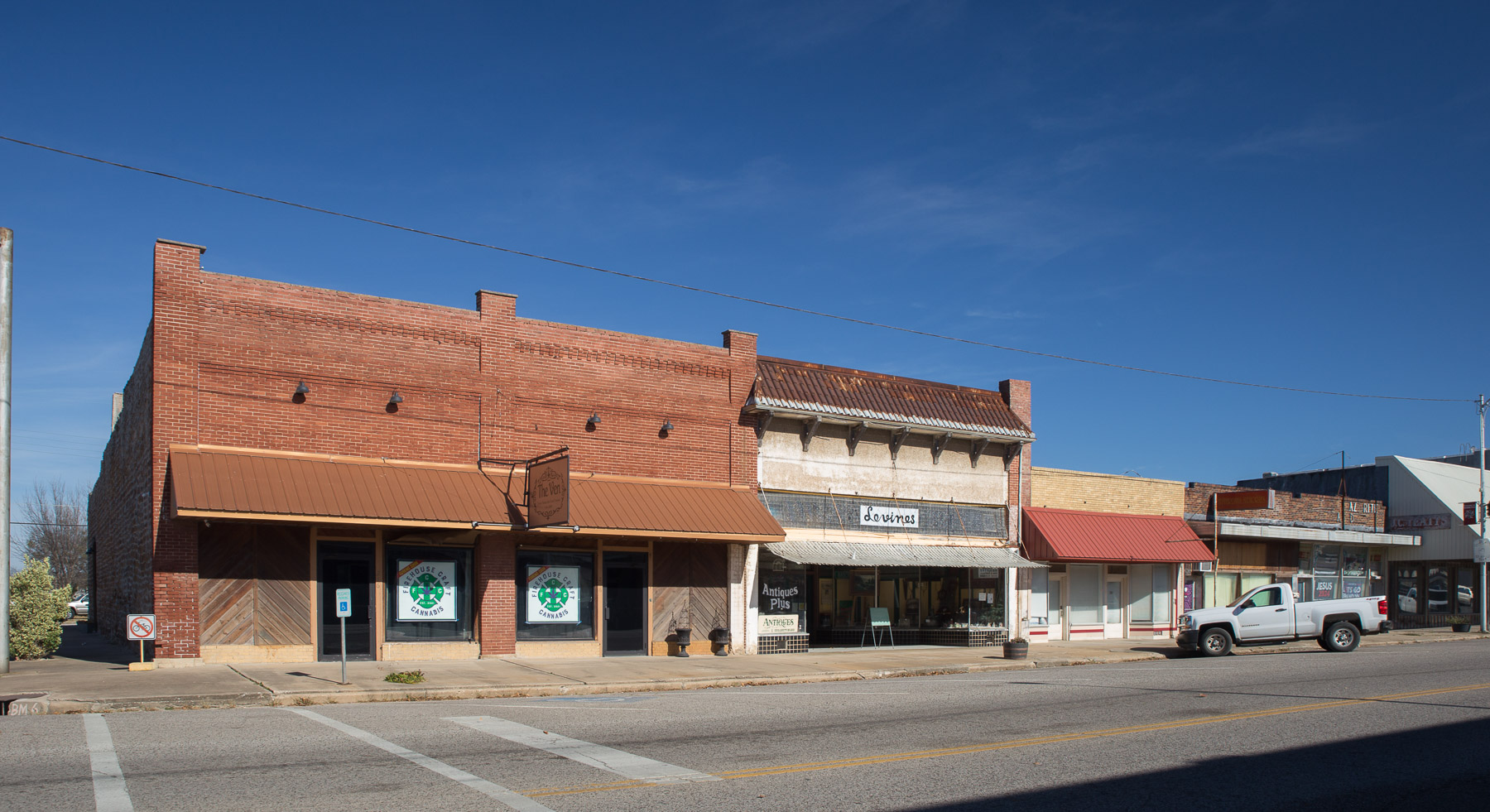
Downtown Marietta

Marietta is a city in and the county seat of Love County, Oklahoma, United States. The population was 2,719 as of the 2020 Census, a 3.5% increase over the 2,626 reported at the 2010 census, which itself was a 7.4 percent increase from the figure of 2,445 in 2000. Marietta is part of the Ardmore, Oklahoma, Micropolitan Statistical Area. For tourism purposes, the Oklahoma Department of Tourism includes it in 'Chickasaw Country'. It is also a part of the Texoma region.

== History ==
Settlers were attracted by the fertile land near the Red River, which was conducive to agriculture and cattle raising. Cotton quickly became the principal crop. William "Bill" Washington had the largest cattle ranch in Pickens County, Chickasaw Nation, Indian Territory. Bill's brother, Jeremiah Calvin Washington (Jerry), who lived about a mile north of present-day Marietta on the Washington Ranch which has a historical marker and is lived in by a Washington descendant's extended family, became the town's first postmaster when the post office opened on December 20, 1887. He was a banker and gentleman rancher. A local story claims that the town was named for Jerry's wife, Marietta Love Washington.

At the time of its founding, Marietta was located in Pickens County, Chickasaw Nation.

The Gulf, Colorado and Santa Fe Railway (later the Atchison, Topeka and Santa Fe Railway) laid its rail line in early 1887, stimulating economic growth for the future town of Marietta, Indian Territory. The first train ran July 28, 1887.

Marietta had 1,391 settlers at the time of Oklahoma Statehood in 1907. The Love County Courthouse, one of four sites in the town listed on the NRHP, was the first built after statehood in Oklahoma and was completed in 1910. There were 1,546 residents in the 1910 census, and the town was served by at least three banks, three churches and 24 retail establishments.

The northwestern part of town was hit by a violent EF4 tornado on April 27, 2024. A large Dollar Tree metal distribution warehouse was shredded with part of the structure collapsing. The tornado flattened the Dollar General store and the next door Homeland was partially blown out when a large wall collapsed. One person was killed on I-35.

== Geography ==
Marietta is 15 miles (24 km) north of the Red River and 114 miles (183 km) south of Oklahoma City. According to the United States Census Bureau, the city has a total area of 2.4 square miles (6.2 km^{2}), of which 2.4 square miles (6.2 km^{2}) is land and 0.42% is water.

== Demographics ==
Historical population
Census	Pop.	Note	%±
1900	842		—
1910	1,546		83.6%
1920	1,977		27.9%
1930	1,505		−23.9%
1940	1,837		22.1%
1950	1,875		2.1%
1960	1,933		3.1%
1970	2,013		4.1%
1980	2,494		23.9%
1990	2,306		−7.5%
2000	2,445		6.0%
2010	2,626		7.4%
2020	2,719		3.5%
U.S. Decennial Census

=== 2020 census ===
As of the 2020 census, Marietta had a population of 2,719. The median age was 34.9 years. 26.5% of residents were under the age of 18 and 17.0% of residents were 65 years of age or older. For every 100 females there were 92.8 males, and for every 100 females age 18 and over there were 90.4 males age 18 and over.

There were 965 households in Marietta, of which 35.0% had children under the age of 18 living in them. Of all households, 39.0% were married-couple households, 22.4% were households with a male householder and no spouse or partner present, and 33.1% were households with a female householder and no spouse or partner present. About 26.0% of all households were made up of individuals and 11.2% had someone living alone who was 65 years of age or older.

There were 1,108 housing units, of which 12.9% were vacant. Among occupied housing units, 52.1% were owner-occupied and 47.9% were renter-occupied. The homeowner vacancy rate was 3.2% and the rental vacancy rate was 14.3%.

0% of residents lived in urban areas, while 100.0% lived in rural areas.

Racial composition as of the 2020 census
Race	Percent
White	56.1%
Black or African American	3.9%
American Indian and Alaska Native	6.8%
Asian	0.4%
Native Hawaiian and Other Pacific Islander	0%
Some other race	19.7%
Two or more races	13.1%
Hispanic or Latino (of any race)	35.3%

=== 2010 census ===
As of the 2010 United States census, there were 2,626 people, 983 households, and 670 families residing in the city. The population density was 1,029.2 inhabitants per square mile (397.4/km^{2}). There were 1,115 housing units at an average density of 461 per square mile (178/km^{2}). The racial makeup of the city was 64.4% white, 4.7% African American, 5.8% Native American, 0.7% Asian, 18.5% from other races, and 5.9% from two or more races. Hispanic or Latino of any race were 25.9% of the population.

There were 983 households, out of which 34.2% had children under the age of 18 living with them, 44.5% were married couples living together, 17.7% had a female householder with no husband present, and 31.8% were non-families. Twenty-eight percent of households were made up of individuals, and 2.3% of the population was institutionalized. The average household size was 2.6 and the average family size was 3.7.

In the city, the population was spread out, with 28.7% under the age of 18, 8.9% from 18 to 24, 26.1% from 25 to 44, 21.2% from 45 to 64, and 15.1% who were 65 years of age or older. The median age was 33.7 years. For every 100 females, there were 87.7 males. For every 100 females age 18 and over, there were 97.1 males.

The median income for a household in the city was $33,198, and the median income for a family was $37,188. Males had a median income of $28,900 versus $25,556 for females. The per capita income for the city was $13,625. About 20% of families and 26% of the population were below the poverty line.

== Economy ==
Downtown Marietta suffered when Interstate 35 was built on the edge of town. By the turn of the 21st Century, the main employers were the Marietta Bakery (400 workers) and Siemens Dematic (65 workers). In January 2004, the bakery declared bankruptcy and closed. Soon after, the Siemens plant closed. Months later the Chickasaw Nation bought the Siemens plant and rehired many of the former employees. That facility now builds and repairs oil field equipment. Still later, it bought the bakery and reopened it, though with a much smaller work force.

== Transportation ==
=== Highways ===
Marietta is located on State Highway 32 at the corner of junction U.S. Route 77 and is just east of Interstate 35.

=== Airports ===
- McGehee Catfish Restaurant Airport was located five nautical miles southwest of the central business district of Marietta. As of February 2020. the airport is closed and non-operational.
- Love County Airport (closed), was two nautical miles northwest of Marietta w/3250' turf runway.
- Hankins Airport (1OK9), a private facility 3 miles north-northeast of Marietta w/2200' turf runway.
- Travis Airport (OK29) (closed), was located 3 miles south of Marietta w/2300' turf runway.
- Faith Field Airport (OL27), a private facility 8 miles northeast of Marietta w/2568' turf runway.

== Notable residents ==
- Guilherme Marchi - former PBR bull rider, 2008 PBR World Champion, assistant coach for the Kansas City Outlaws PBR team

== Photo gallery ==
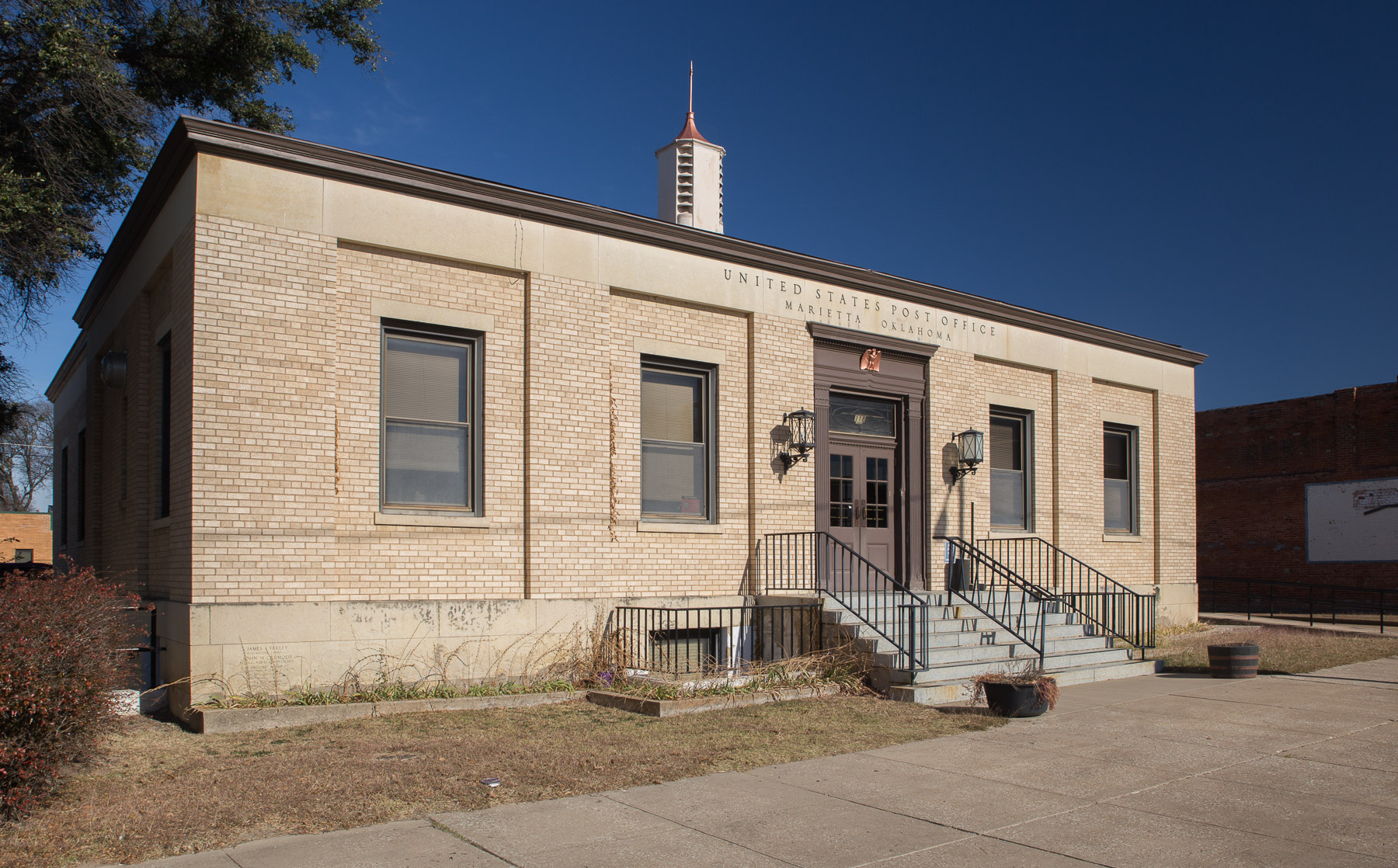
United States Post Office

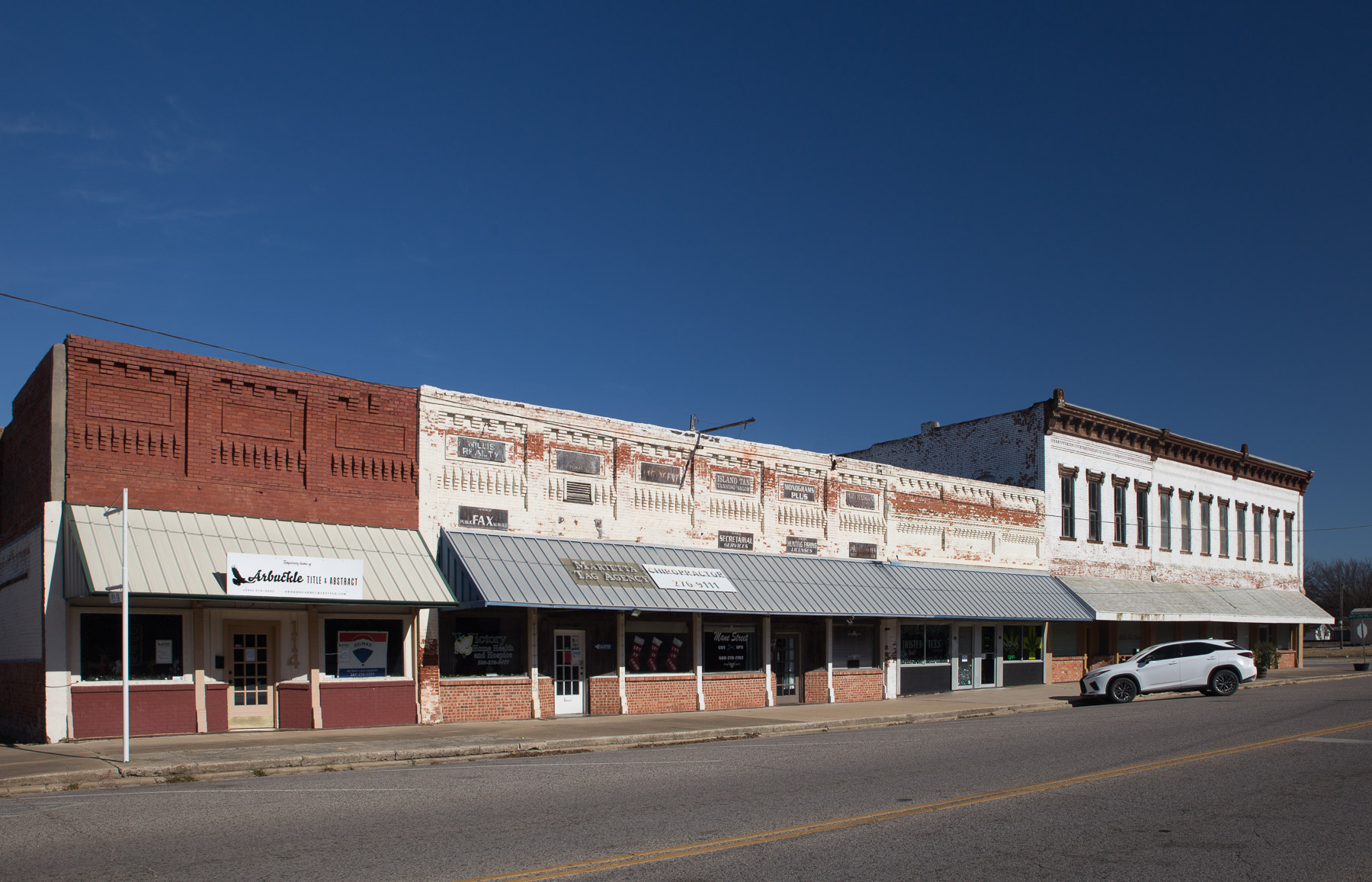
Downtown Marietta

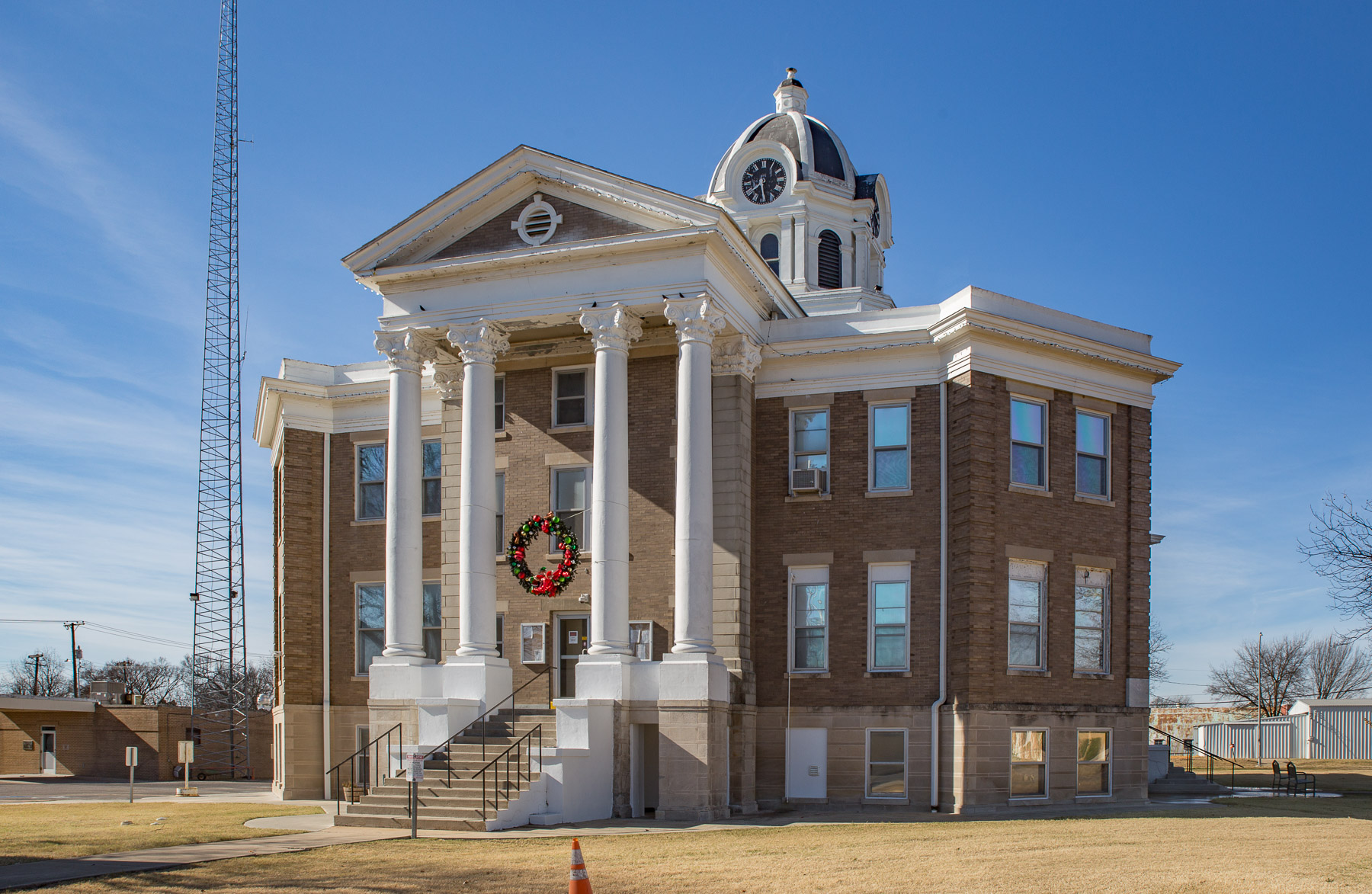
Love County Courthouse

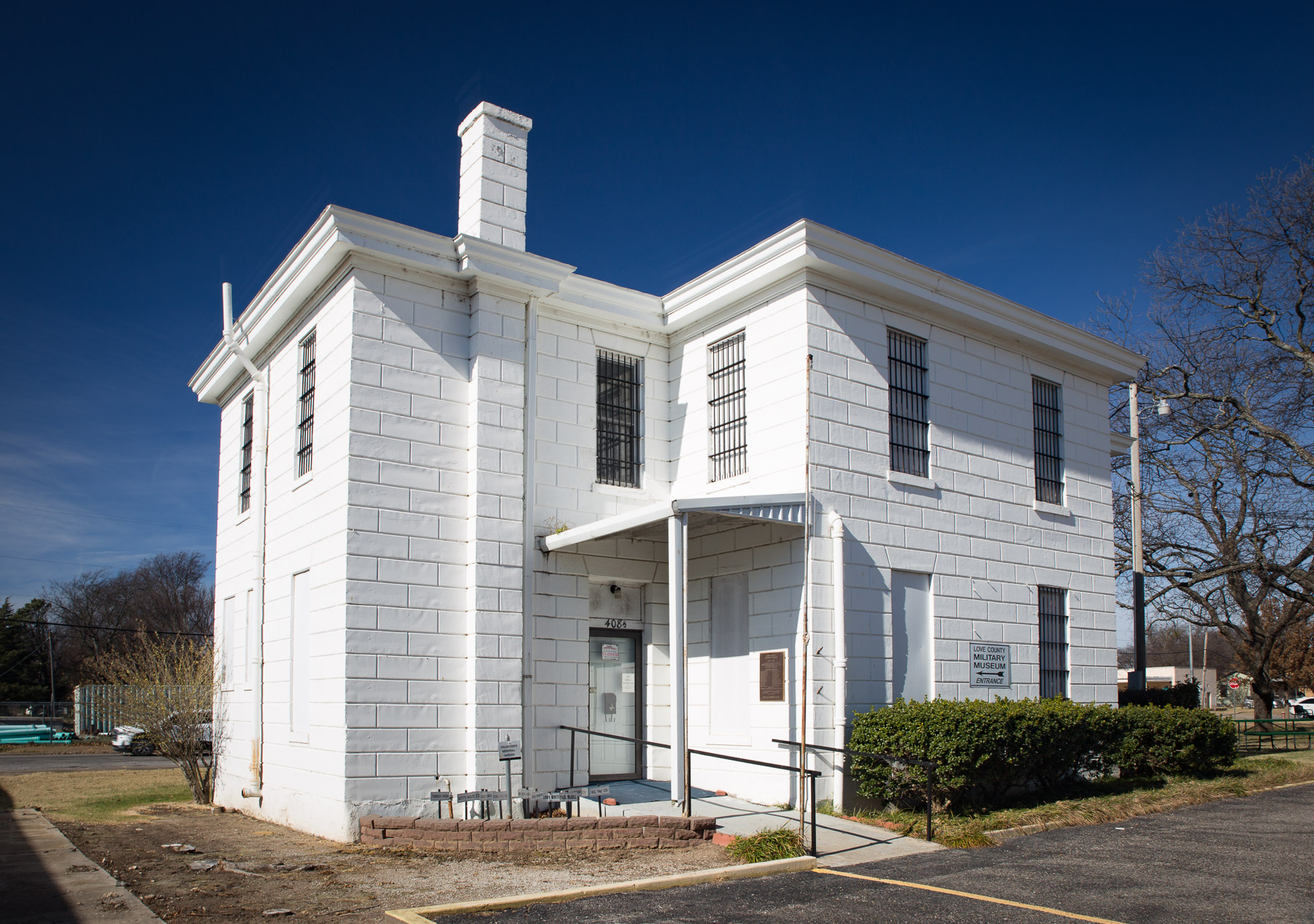
Old Love County Jail

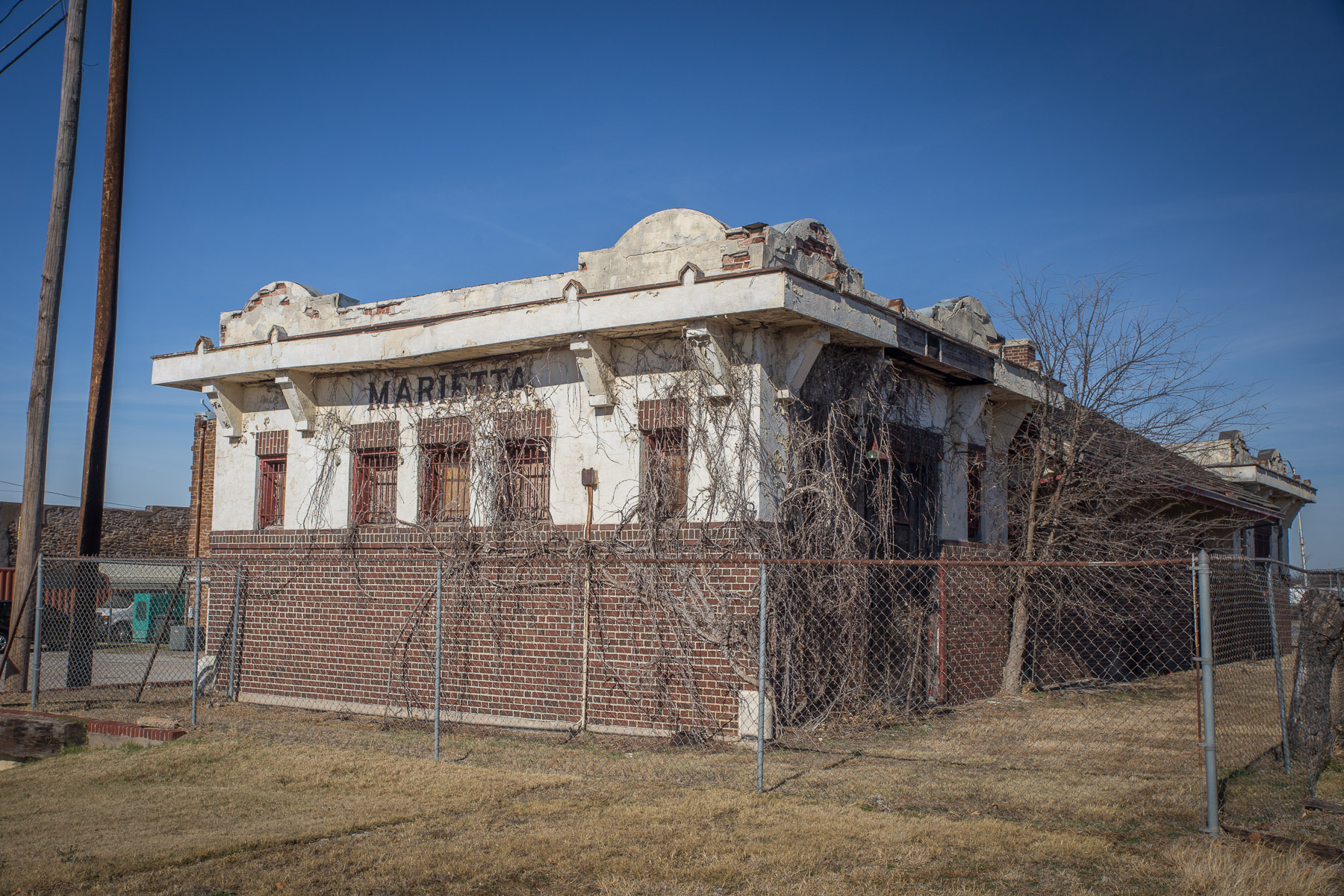
Santa Fe Depot
