= National Register of Historic Places listings in Bryan County, Oklahoma =

Location of Bryan County in Oklahoma

This is a list of the National Register of Historic Places listings in Bryan County, Oklahoma.

This is intended to be a complete list of the properties and districts on the National Register of Historic Places in Bryan County, Oklahoma, United States. The locations of National Register properties and districts for which the latitude and longitude coordinates are included below, may be seen in a map.

There are 16 properties and districts listed on the National Register in the county, including 1 National Historic Landmark.

This National Park Service list is complete through NPS recent listings posted March 21, 2025.

== Current listings ==
	Name on the Register	Image	Date listed	Location	City or town	Description
1	Armstrong Academy Site		April 13, 1972 (#72001056)	3 miles northeast of Bokchito; 34°03′01″N 96°11′59″W	Bokchito	
2	Bloomfield Academy Site		November 15, 1972 (#72001055)	South of Achille off State Highway 78; 33°47′58″N 96°23′01″W	Achille	
3	Bryan County Courthouse	Bryan County Courthouse	August 23, 1984 (#84002974)	4th Ave. and Evergreen St. 33°59′34″N 96°22′52″W	Durant	
4	Caddo Community Building		September 8, 1988 (#88001376)	E. Buffalo St. 34°07′32″N 96°15′43″W	Caddo	
5	Carriage Point		June 29, 1972 (#72001058)	4 miles west of Durant; 33°59′07″N 96°27′16″W	Durant	
6	Colbert's Ferry Site		June 29, 1972 (#72001057)	3 miles southeast of Colbert; 33°49′13″N 96°31′20″W	Colbert	
7	Durant Downtown Historic District	Durant Downtown Historic District	June 5, 2007 (#07000517)	Roughly bounded by 4th Ave., Lost St., Evergreen St., and 1st Ave. 33°59′29″N 96°22′43″W	Durant	
8	Fort McCulloch		June 21, 1971 (#71000659)	2 miles southwest of Kenefic; 34°07′52″N 96°23′42″W	Kenefic	
9	Fort Washita	Fort Washita	October 15, 1966 (#66000626)	Southwest of Nida on State Highway 199; 34°06′13″N 96°32′54″W	Nida	
10	Robert E. Lee School	Robert E. Lee School	September 8, 1988 (#88001374)	9th and Louisiana Sts. 33°59′22″N 96°23′09″W	Durant	
11	Nail's Station		June 29, 1972 (#72001059)	2 miles southwest of Kenefic; 34°07′52″N 96°23′26″W	Kenefic	
12	Oklahoma Presbyterian College	Oklahoma Presbyterian College	December 12, 1976 (#76001556)	601 N. 16th St. 34°00′00″N 96°23′35″W	Durant	
13	Roberta School Campus		September 8, 1988 (#88001377)	Off State Highway 70; 33°55′41″N 96°18′13″W	Durant	
14	State Highway 78 Bridge at the Red River	State Highway 78 Bridge at the Red River	December 20, 1996 (#96001517)	State Highway 78, across the Red River at the Oklahoma-Texas state line 33°45′10″N 96°11′45″W	Kemp	Extends into Fannin County, Texas
15	Robert Lee Williams Public Library	Robert Lee Williams Public Library	September 8, 1988 (#88001375)	4th and Beech Sts. 33°59′36″N 96°22′44″W	Durant	Now the county courthouse annex.
16	J. L. Wilson Building	J. L. Wilson Building	April 20, 1982 (#82003668)	202 W. Evergreen St. 33°59′26″N 96°22′48″W	Durant	

== See also ==
- List of National Historic Landmarks in Oklahoma
- National Register of Historic Places listings in Oklahoma
