= Tornado outbreak of April 9, 1919 =

Weather event in the United States

Meteorological history
- Formed: April 9, 1919

Tornado outbreak
- Tornadoes: 12
- Max. rating: F4 tornado

Overall effects
- Fatalities: ≥92
- Injuries: 412
- Areas affected: Southern Great Plains

On April 9, 1919, a tornado outbreak occurred in the Southern Great Plains of the United States, producing numerous strong tornadoes and killing at least 92 people, mainly in portions of North and East Texas. The entire outbreak occurred overnight and produced at least seven intense, deadly tornadoes, the deadliest of which was a long-tracked, extremely violent F4 in East Texas that killed 24 people and injured 100 others. A separate F4 long-tracker in the same region killed 17 others and injured 60 more. A deadly F3 also claimed nine or more lives in southern Oklahoma, and a long-lived F3 in East Texas crossed into Arkansas, killing eight. Several of the tornadoes in this outbreak may have been families of two or more tornadoes. (Note: An outbreak is generally defined as a group of at least six tornadoes (the number sometimes varies slightly according to local climatology) with no more than a six-hour gap between individual tornadoes. An outbreak sequence, prior to (after) the start of modern records in 1950, is defined as a period of no more than two (one) consecutive days without at least one significant (F2 or stronger) tornado.) (Note: The Fujita scale was devised under the aegis of scientist T. Theodore Fujita in the early 1970s. Prior to the advent of the scale in 1971, tornadoes in the United States were officially unrated. While the Fujita scale has been superseded by the Enhanced Fujita scale in the U.S. since February 1, 2007, Canada used the old scale until April 1, 2013; nations elsewhere, like the United Kingdom, apply other classifications such as the TORRO scale.) (Note: Historically, the number of tornadoes globally and in the United States was and is likely underrepresented: research by Grazulis on annual tornado activity suggests that, as of 2001, only 53% of yearly U.S. tornadoes were officially recorded. Documentation of tornadoes outside the United States was historically less exhaustive, owing to the lack of monitors in many nations and, in some cases, to internal political controls on public information. Most countries only recorded tornadoes that produced severe damage or loss of life. Significant low biases in U.S. tornado counts likely occurred through the early 1990s, when advanced NEXRAD was first installed and the National Weather Service began comprehensively verifying tornado occurrences.)

== Confirmed tornadoes ==
Confirmed tornadoes by Fujita rating
FU	F0	F1	F2	F3	F4	F5	Total
0	0	0	5	3	4	0	12

=== April 9 event ===
Confirmed tornadoes – Wednesday, April 9, 1919 (Note: All dates are based on the local time zone where the tornado touched down; however, all times are in Coordinated Universal Time and dates are split at midnight CST/CDT for consistency.) (Note: Prior to 1994, only the average widths of tornado paths were officially listed.)
F#	Location	County / Parish	State	Time (UTC)	Path length	Max. width	Summary
F4	Blue Ridge to Ravenna	Collin, Fannin	TX	05:45–?	30 mi (48 km)	400 yd (370 m)	18 deaths, 60 injuries – This violent nocturnal tornado moved north-northeastward and due north at times, devastating such rural communities as Blue Ridge, Delba, Trenton, and Ector. Near Blue Ridge six of eight family members died. At Ector two boys died running from the tornado in a field. 25% of Ravenna was destroyed. In all, losses reached $200,000, and many small farmhouses were obliterated.
F2	Canaan to E of Bells	Grayson	TX	06:30–?	5 mi (8.0 km)	100 yd (91 m)	2+ deaths, 20 injuries – This strong tornado wrecked a church, store, and 16 homes at Canaan. A 27-car freight train derailed, two cars of which were tossed 60 ft (20 yd). A third death may have occurred.
F4	SE of Whitewright, TX to Yarnaby, OK	Grayson (TX), Fannin (TX), Bryan (OK)	TX, OK	06:45–?	25 mi (40 km)	300 yd (270 m)	8 deaths, 50 injuries – This violent tornado moved north-northeast, destroying or damaging 15 homes near Whitewright. In the area 10 people sustained serious injuries. The entire town of Mulberry sustained damage and seven deaths. Additional homes were destroyed in Oklahoma.
F2	Albany	Bryan	OK	07:00–?	Unknown	Unknown	1 death, 3 injuries – One home was destroyed.
F2	Mullin	Mills	TX	07:10–?	2 mi (3.2 km)	300 yd (270 m)	20 homes, a church, hotel, and bank were damaged. One person was injured and losses totaled $100,000.
F3	SW of Roberta to NE of Durant	Bryan	OK	07:45–?	10 mi (16 km)	Unknown	9+ deaths, 35 injuries – At least 12 homes were wrecked. Several of the injured may have died later.
F2	Armstrong	Bryan	OK	08:00–?	Unknown	Unknown	An oil tanker, school, water plant, and three homes were wrecked. Trees downstream were coated with oil. Five people were injured.
F3	NW of Bromide to E of Stonewall	Coal, Pontotoc	OK	08:30–?	20 mi (32 km)	200 yd (180 m)	1 death, 4 injuries – This may have been a family of tornadoes. The most intense damage occurred near Jesse; in this area 14 homes were destroyed or damaged.
F4	N of Eustace to SE of Grand Saline	Henderson, Van Zandt	TX	09:30–?	30 mi (48 km)	1,000 yd (910 m)	17 deaths, 60 injuries – This may have been a family of up to three distinct tornadoes. Extremely violent, it produced a 1 1/2-mile-wide (2.4 km) swath of destruction. Most of Canton was impacted. 13 of the deaths occurred between Tundra and Big Rock.
F4	SE of Mineola to Blodgett	Wood, Camp, Titus	TX	10:15–?	50 mi (80 km)	600 yd (550 m)	24 deaths, 100 injuries – Rural communities were obliterated, along with numerous homes. A continuous, 1-mile-wide (1.6 km) swath of intense damage was reported. 11 of the deaths and 60 of the injuries occurred in Wood County. Losses totaled $450,000.
F2	Oak Grove	Red River, Bowie	TX	11:00–?	10 mi (16 km)	Unknown	4+ deaths, 15 injuries – At least six small homes were wrecked. Three more people may have later died from injuries.
F3	NW of Texarkana, TX to N of Columbus, AR	Bowie (TX), Little River (AR), Hempstead (AR), Howard (AR)	TX, AR	13:15–?	30 mi (48 km)	400 yd (370 m)	8 deaths, 59 injuries – In Arkansas this intense tornado destroyed or damaged a pair of churches and 30 homes in the Ogden–Saratoga area. Barns were wrecked near the end of the path. Losses totaled $75,000.

== See also ==
- List of North American tornadoes and tornado outbreaks

== Sources ==
- Brooks, Harold E. (April 2004). "On the Relationship of Tornado Path Length and Width to Intensity". Weather and Forecasting. 19 (2): 310–19. Bibcode:2004WtFor..19..310B. doi:10.1175/1520-0434(2004)019<0310:OTROTP>2.0.CO;2.
- Cook, A. R.; Schaefer, J. T. (August 2008). "The Relation of El Niño–Southern Oscillation (ENSO) to Winter Tornado Outbreaks". Monthly Weather Review. 136 (8): 3121–3137. Bibcode:2008MWRv..136.3121C. doi:10.1175/2007MWR2171.1.
- Grazulis, Thomas P. (May 1984). Violent Tornado Climatography, 1880–1982. OSTI (Technical report). NUREG. Washington, D.C.: Nuclear Regulatory Commission. OSTI 7099491. CR-3670.
  - — (November 1990). Significant Tornadoes 1880–1989. Vol. 2. St. Johnsbury, Vermont: The Tornado Project of Environmental Films. ISBN 1-879362-02-3.
  - — (July 1993). Significant Tornadoes 1680–1991: A Chronology and Analysis of Events. St. Johnsbury, Vermont: The Tornado Project of Environmental Films. ISBN 1-879362-03-1.
  - — (2001a). The Tornado: Nature's Ultimate Windstorm. Norman: University of Oklahoma Press. ISBN 978-0-8061-3538-0.
  - — (2001b). F5-F6 Tornadoes. St. Johnsbury, Vermont: The Tornado Project of Environmental Films.
