= Island Bayou (Oklahoma) =

Location
- Country: United States of America
- State: Oklahoma
- City: Calera, Oklahoma

Physical characteristics
- Source: near Calera, Bryan County, Oklahoma, United States of America
- Mouth
  - elevation: 459 ft (140 m)

Basin features
- River system: Red River
- Tributaries
  - left: Moore Creek, Caney Creek, Sassafras Creek, Long Creek, Wolf Creek, Jones Creek, Brushy Creek
  - right: Ranger Creek

Island Bayou is a 46.0-mile-long (74.0 km) tributary of the Red River in Oklahoma.

The stream rises northwest of Calera in Bryan County and flows southeastward before emptying into the Red River south of Wade. Its entire length is within Bryan County.

The Treaty of Doaksville (1837) set Island Bayou as the boundary between the Chickasaw and Choctaw Nations in Indian Territory; however, the description was uncertain. It was not until 1854 that the Choctaw-Chickasaw treaty of that year gave certainty to the boundary:

"viz: Beginning on the north bank of the Red River, at the mouth of Island Bayou, where it empties into the Red River...thence, northerly along the eastern prong of Island Bayou to its source; thence, due north to the Canadian River".

The Texas Road and the old Butterfield Overland Mail route ran past the head of Island Bayou at Fisher's Station, also known as Carriage Point.

The elevation at its mouth is 459 feet (140 m) above sea level, at 33.848ºN 96.104ºW.

== Sources ==
- Kappler, Charles (ed.). "TREATY WITH THE CHOCTAW AND CHICKASAW, 1837 (Doaksville)". Indian Affairs: Laws and Treaties. Washington: Government Printing Office, 1904. 2:486-488 (accessed August 25, 2006).
- Kappler, Charles (ed.). "TREATY WITH THE CHOCTAW AND CHICKASAW, 1854". Indian Affairs: Laws and Treaties. Washington: Government Printing Office, 1904. 2:652-653 (accessed August 25, 2006).
- Wright, Muriel H. "Organization of the Counties in the Choctaw and Chickasaw Nations". Chronicles of Oklahoma 8:3 (September 1930) 315–334. (accessed August 26, 2006).
