= Banty (disambiguation) =

Banty may refer to:

- Banty Raids, a 1963 animated short
- Butterfly Banty, an American homebuilt ultralight aircraft
- Banty, Oklahoma, an unincorporated community in Bryan County, Oklahoma, United States

== See also ==
- Séamus McEnaney, nickname Banty, a Gaelic football manager and businessman
