= Bryan County Courthouse =

Bryan County Courthouse may refer to:

- Bryan County Courthouse (Georgia), Pembroke, Georgia
- Bryan County Courthouse (Oklahoma), Durant, Oklahoma
