= Sand Point, Oklahoma =

Unincorporated community in Oklahoma, US

- Census-designated place
- Location within Oklahoma Location within the United States
- Coordinates: 33°57′53″N 96°33′48″W
- Country: United States
- State: Oklahoma
- County: Bryan

Area
  - Total: 1.28 sq mi (3.32 km^{2})
  - Land: 0.93 sq mi (2.41 km^{2})
  - Water: 0.35 sq mi (0.91 km^{2})
- Elevation: 650 ft (200 m)

Population (2020)
  - Total: 251
  - Density: 270.2/sq mi (104.32/km^{2})
- Time zone: UTC-6 (Central (CST))
  - Summer (DST): UTC-5 (CDT)
- ZIP Code: 73449 (Mead)
- Area code: 580
- FIPS code: 40-65250
- GNIS feature ID: 2812845

Sand Point is an unincorporated community and census-designated place (CDP) on Lake Texoma in Bryan County, Oklahoma, United States. It was first listed as a CDP prior to the 2020 census. As of the 2020 census, Sand Point had a population of 251.

The CDP is in western Bryan County, on the east shore of the Washita River tributary arm of Lake Texoma, an impoundment on the Red River. It is 12 miles (19 km) west of Durant, the county seat.

== Demographics ==
Historical population
Census	Pop.	Note	%±
2020	251		—
U.S. Decennial Census

=== 2020 census ===
As of the 2020 census, Sand Point had a population of 251. The median age was 52.4 years. 22.7% of residents were under the age of 18 and 22.3% of residents were 65 years of age or older. For every 100 females there were 96.1 males, and for every 100 females age 18 and over there were 98.0 males age 18 and over.

0.0% of residents lived in urban areas, while 100.0% lived in rural areas.

There were 102 households in Sand Point, of which 23.5% had children under the age of 18 living in them. Of all households, 59.8% were married-couple households, 20.6% were households with a male householder and no spouse or partner present, and 15.7% were households with a female householder and no spouse or partner present. About 26.5% of all households were made up of individuals and 12.8% had someone living alone who was 65 years of age or older.

There were 182 housing units, of which 44.0% were vacant. The homeowner vacancy rate was 0.0% and the rental vacancy rate was 0.0%.

Racial composition as of the 2020 census
Race	Number	Percent
White	183	72.9%
Black or African American	0	0.0%
American Indian and Alaska Native	24	9.6%
Asian	1	0.4%
Native Hawaiian and Other Pacific Islander	0	0.0%
Some other race	0	0.0%
Two or more races	43	17.1%
Hispanic or Latino (of any race)	13	5.2%
