= Wade, Oklahoma =

Unincorporated community in Oklahoma, US

- Unincorporated community
- Location within Oklahoma
- Coordinates: 33°53′20″N 96°04′34″W
- Country: United States
- State: Oklahoma
- County: Bryan
- Elevation: 528 ft (161 m)
- Time zone: UTC-6 (Central (CST))
  - Summer (DST): UTC-5 (CDT)
- Area code: Area code 580
- GNIS feature ID: 1099282

Wade is an unincorporated community in Bryan County, Oklahoma, United States. The community is located on Oklahoma State Highway 70E, 11 miles (18 km) south of Bokchito. Wade had a post office from October 24, 1890, to November 30, 1971. The community was named for Choctaw Alfred Wade.
