= St. Louis, San Francisco and New Orleans Railroad =

Former American railroad

Overview
- Locale: Oklahoma and Arkansas
- Dates of operation: 1895–1907

Technical
- Track gauge: 4 ft 8 1/2 in (1,435 mm) standard gauge
- Length: 219 mi (352 km)

The St. Louis, San Francisco and New Orleans Railroad (“New Orleans”) ran from Hope, Arkansas to a point near Ardmore, Oklahoma, and encompassed about 219 miles of track including a branch line. It existed from 1895 (under a different name) to 1907, when its assets were taken over by the St. Louis-San Francisco Railway (“Frisco”).

== History ==
The New Orleans was incorporated August 31, 1895, under Arkansas law with the name then being the Arkansas and Choctaw Railway. Its initial line was Ashdown to Arkinda, Arkansas, about 24 miles. It was controlled by the Central Coal & Coke Co. of Kansas City, Missouri until June 11, 1901. At that time, the owners decided to extend the line from Ashdown to Stamps, Arkansas, and from Arkinda to Wichita Falls, Texas; so, control of the line passed to the Choctaw Construction Co. which was in charge of the new construction. However, on June 21, 1902, all shareholders of Choctaw Construction agreed to sell to the Frisco, and the line then came under the control of a Frisco financial syndicate. Construction plans changed, with the intent to run the line from Hope, Arkansas to Ardmore, Oklahoma. The longer-range vision was for the line to act as a link in the Frisco organization to facilitate shipments out of Colorado, southern and western Oklahoma, and northern Texas, going all the way to New Orleans. Hence Frisco had a desire to ultimately extend the route west to Wichita Falls or at least Lawton, Oklahoma, and east to a connection with a main new trunk line running south down the west bank of the Mississippi from Memphis.

On October 2, 1902 the company’s name was changed by charter amendment to the St. Louis, San Francisco, and New Orleans Railroad Co. And, while building its mainline in the 1902-1903 timeframe, the New Orleans also added a 9.2 mile spur from Kiersey Junction, near Kiersey, Oklahoma just west of Durant, running south to Texas Junction, a point on a separate Frisco line heading from Madill south into Denison, Texas. As it turned out, the railway never expanded further, all construction being completed by 1903. In 1904, operation was discontinued on trackage which started from a point called Frisco Junction, being a junction with the Rock Island rail line east of Ardmore, and continuing into Ardmore paralleling the Rock Island tracks.

The line’s property was taken over directly by the Frisco on April 30, 1907. At that time, the New Orleans had a standard, single track mainline running from Hope westerly through Idabel, Valliant, Fort Towson, Hugo, Durant, and Madill to Frisco Junction, about 210 miles, with a branch from Kiersey Junction to Texas Junction, about 9 miles, for a total of 219 miles of track.

In subsequent history, 12.4 miles of the Ardmore to Frisco Junction trackage was taken up in 1917; the Kiersey Junction to Texas Junction tracks were removed in 1934; an additional 1.1 miles in Ardmore were abandoned in 1940 by then-owner AT&SF; and, 16.6 miles from Madill to Meade were abandoned in 1942. The rest of the line, from Hope to Lakeside, Oklahoma and then via trackage rights to a connection with the BNSF at Madill, is now operated by the Kiamichi Railroad.
