= Fort McCulloch =

- U.S. National Register of Historic Places
- Location within Oklahoma Location within the United States
- Location: Bryan County, Oklahoma, USA
- Nearest city: Kenefic, Oklahoma
- Coordinates: 34°07′53″N 96°23′45″W
- Built: 1862
- NRHP reference No.: 71000659
- Added to NRHP: June 21, 1971

Fort McCulloch was a Confederate military fort built by CSA Brigadier General Albert Pike in the Indian Territory during the American Civil War after the Battle of Pea Ridge.

== History ==
After the southern states seceded from the United States of America, Albert Pike negotiated treaties between the Five Civilized Tribes and the Confederate government, promising that the Confederacy would take over the obligations that the Union failed to fulfill and take over defense for the Indian Territory.

Pike was appointed commander of the Department of the Indian Territory in November 1861. His first assignment was to construct a fort north of Bacone College on the Arkansas River near Muskogee. He named this site Cantonment Davis. However, he and his troops were ordered to leave the site to support the Confederate troops at Pea Ridge. They never returned to Cantonment Davis.

Pike's Native American troops participated in the Battle of Pea Ridge near Leetown, Arkansas in March 1862. The battle was a defeat for the Confederate Army. Pike then considered that his Indian Territory command post at Fort Davis, Cherokee Nation, was vulnerable to a Union attack. He retreated to the Choctaw Nation in southern Indian Territory. Pike chose a site on a bluff on the west side of the Blue River near Nail's Crossing, where he established Fort McCulloch, named for General Benjamin McCulloch, who fell in battle at Pea Ridge.

The site, about 3 miles (4.8 km) southwest of the present-day town of Kenefic, Oklahoma, controlled military roads linking Fort Smith with Fort Washita, Fort Gibson and north Texas. The fort had earthworks, but no permanent buildings. Its importance diminished after Pike resigned his command in July 1862. It was not abandoned until the end of the war. Meanwhile, it served as a haven for pro-Confederate refugees. General Stand Watie used it briefly as a command post in 1865.

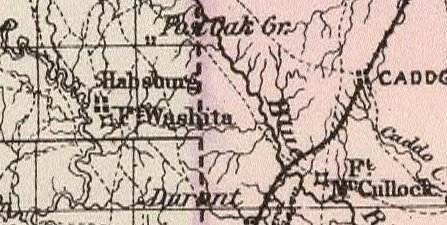
portion of 1887 Indian Territory map with Fort McCulloch and Fort Washita

Fort McCulloch was built to defend Texas from a Union attack. It had extensive earthworks designed to defend against any advance.
