= Allison, Oklahoma =

Unincorporated community in Oklahoma, US

Allison
- Unincorporated community
- Location within the state of Oklahoma Allison (the United States)
- Coordinates: 33°53′45″N 96°22′18″W
- Country: United States
- State: Oklahoma
- County: Bryan
- Named for: Mount Allison school
- Time zone: UTC-6 (Central (CST))
  - Summer (DST): UTC-5 (CDT)
- Area code: 580
- GNIS feature ID: 1100169

Allison is an unincorporated community in Bryan County, Oklahoma, United States. It is located seven miles south of Durant, and had a post office from March 6, 1901, to December 15, 1921. Allison was named after the nearby Mount Allison school.
