= Banty, Oklahoma =

Unincorporated community in Oklahoma, US

Banty
- Unincorporated community
- Location within the state of Oklahoma Banty (the United States)
- Coordinates: 34°04′11″N 96°05′42″W
- Country: United States
- State: Oklahoma
- County: Bryan
- Time zone: UTC-6 (Central (CST))
  - Summer (DST): UTC-5 (CDT)
- GNIS feature ID: 1100191

Banty is an unincorporated community in Bryan County, Oklahoma, United States.

It is five miles north of Bennington and had a post office from July 31, 1901 to July 5, 1949. There was a general store that was there until the mid 70s. There is a granite marker .2miles east of the junction of Banty road and Armstrong academy road as a remembrance of the town. At the time of its founding, Banty was located in Blue County, Choctaw Nation.
