= Nail's Station =

Overland Mail stagecoach stop in Oklahoma

- U.S. National Register of Historic Places
- Location within Oklahoma
- Location: Bryan County, Oklahoma
- Nearest city: Kenefic, Oklahoma
- Coordinates: 34°07′52.4″N 96°23′25.8″W
- Built: 1858
- NRHP reference No.: 72001059

Significant dates
- Commerce: 1850-1874
- Transportation: 1850-1874
- Added to NRHP: June 29, 1972
- Designated: June 29, 1972

Nail's Station was a stage stand on the old Butterfield Overland Mail route and the Texas Road in Indian Territory. Sometimes called Blue River Station or Nail's Crossing, it was located on the east side of Blue River in what is now Bryan County, Oklahoma. It was operated by Joel H. Nail, a member of a prominent Choctaw family.

Nail's Station was added to the National Register of Historic Places (#72001059) in 1972.

== Sources ==
- Shirk, George H. Oklahoma Place Names. Norman: University of Oklahoma Press, 1987: ISBN 0-8061-2028-2 .
- Wright, Murial H.; George H. Shirk; Kenny A. Franks. Mark of Heritage. Oklahoma City: Oklahoma Historical Society, 1976.
- Wright, Muriel H. "The Butterfield Overland Mail One Hundred Years Ago", Chronicles of Oklahoma 35:1 (January 1957) 55-71 (accessed August 19, 2006).

Butterfield Overland Mail in Indian Territory
Next station West; Fisher's Station	14 miles	Nail's Station	17 miles	Next station East; Boggy Depot
