= Fisher's Station =

Overland Mail stagecoach stop in Texas

- Carriage Point
- U.S. National Register of Historic Places
- Location within Oklahoma Location within the United States
- Location: 4 mi. W of Durant, Oklahoma in Bryan County
- Nearest city: Durant, Oklahoma
- Coordinates: 33°59′7″N 96°27′16″W
- Built: 1858
- NRHP reference No.: 72001058
- Added to NRHP: June 29, 1972

Fisher's Station, also known as Carriage Point, was a stage stand on the old Butterfield Overland Mail route and the Texas Road in Indian Territory. It was located at the head of Island Bayou in what is now Bryan County, Oklahoma. Island Bayou was then the dividing line between the Chickasaw and Choctaw Nations. From March 23, 1869, to February 6, 1871, the Carriage Point post office existed at the site and it is generally referred to by that name in the area. The station was run by Fisher Durant, a well known Choctaw family who founded nearby Durant.

Fisher's Station (Carriage Point) was added to the National Register of Historic Places (#72001058) in 1972.

== Sources ==
- Shirk, George H. Oklahoma Place Names. Norman: University of Oklahoma Press, 1987: ISBN 0-8061-2028-2 .
- Wright, Murial H.; George H. Shirk; Kenny A. Franks. Mark of Heritage. Oklahoma City: Oklahoma Historical Society, 1976.
- Wright, Muriel H. "The Butterfield Overland Mail One Hundred Years Ago", Chronicles of Oklahoma 35:1 (January 1957) 55-71 (accessed August 19, 2006).

Butterfield Overland Mail in Indian Territory
Next station West; Colbert's Ferry	13 miles	Fisher's Station	14 miles	Next station East; Nail's Station
