= Utica, Oklahoma =

Unincorporated community in Oklahoma, US

- Unincorporated community
- Location within Oklahoma Location within the United States
- Coordinates: 33°54′18″N 96°13′17″W
- Country: United States
- State: Oklahoma
- County: Bryan

Area
  - Total: 0.46 sq mi (1.19 km^{2})
  - Land: 0.46 sq mi (1.19 km^{2})
  - Water: 0 sq mi (0.00 km^{2})
- Elevation: 600 ft (180 m)

Population (2020)
  - Total: 51
  - Density: 111.2/sq mi (42.92/km^{2})
- Time zone: UTC-6 (Central (CST))
  - Summer (DST): UTC-5 (CDT)
- ZIP code: 74763
- Area code: 580
- GNIS feature ID: 2805358

Utica is an unincorporated community in Bryan County, Oklahoma, United States. As of the 2020 census, Utica had a population of 51. Utica is 11 miles (18 km) southeast of Durant. Utica has a post office with ZIP code 74763.

== Demographics ==
Historical population
Census	Pop.	Note	%±
2020	51		—
U.S. Decennial Census

=== 2020 census ===
As of the 2020 census, Utica had a population of 51. The median age was 45.5 years. 25.5% of residents were under the age of 18 and 3.9% of residents were 65 years of age or older. For every 100 females there were 82.1 males, and for every 100 females age 18 and over there were 72.7 males age 18 and over.

0.0% of residents lived in urban areas, while 100.0% lived in rural areas.

There were 22 households in Utica, of which 40.9% had children under the age of 18 living in them. Of all households, 36.4% were married-couple households, 40.9% were households with a male householder and no spouse or partner present, and 9.1% were households with a female householder and no spouse or partner present. About 31.8% of all households were made up of individuals and 27.3% had someone living alone who was 65 years of age or older.

There were 28 housing units, of which 21.4% were vacant. The homeowner vacancy rate was 0.0% and the rental vacancy rate was 0.0%.

Racial composition as of the 2020 census
Race	Number	Percent
White	40	78.4%
Black or African American	0	0.0%
American Indian and Alaska Native	8	15.7%
Asian	1	2.0%
Native Hawaiian and Other Pacific Islander	0	0.0%
Some other race	0	0.0%
Two or more races	2	3.9%
Hispanic or Latino (of any race)	5	9.8%
