= Marshall County Courthouse (Oklahoma) =

- U.S. National Register of Historic Places
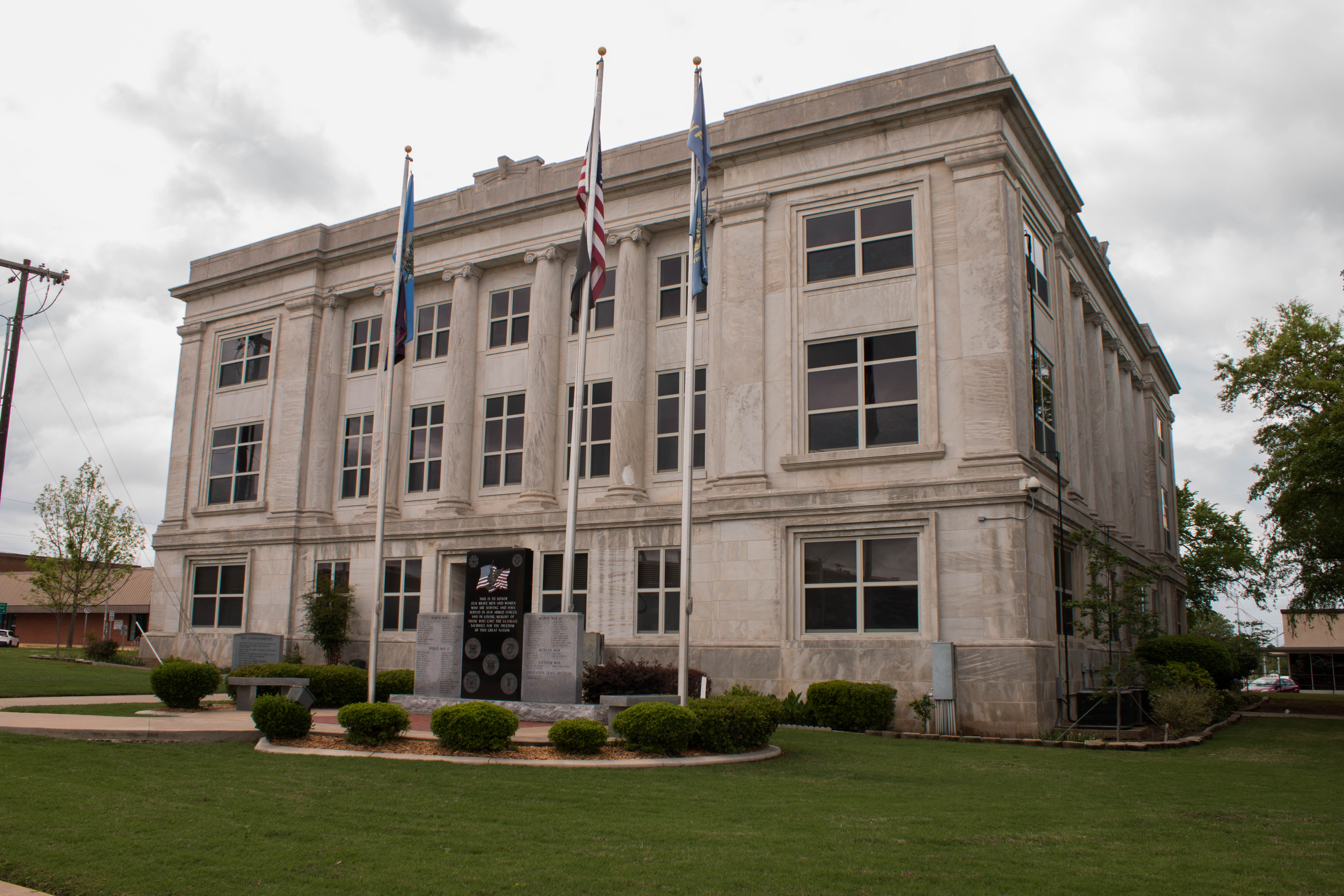

- Location within Oklahoma Location within the United States
- Interactive map showing the location of Marshall County Courthouse
- Location: Courthouse Square, Madill, Oklahoma
- Coordinates: 34°05′27″N 96°46′13″W
- Area: 1 acre (0.40 ha)
- Built: 1913
- Architect: Jewell Hicks
- MPS: County Courthouses of Oklahoma TR
- NRHP reference No.: 84003154
- Added to NRHP: August 23, 1984

The Marshall County Courthouse, at 100 E. Main Street in Madill in Marshall County, Oklahoma, is a historic courthouse built in 1913. It was listed on the National Register of Historic Places in 1984.

It was designed by architect Jewell Hicks, who also contributed to design of the state capitol. The building has large pilasters at its corners.
