= Platter, Oklahoma =

Unincorporated community in Oklahoma, US

Platter
- Unincorporated community
- Location within the state of Oklahoma Platter (the United States)
- Coordinates: 33°54′24″N 96°32′02″W
- Country: United States
- State: Oklahoma
- County: Bryan

Area
  - Total: 1.70 sq mi (4.41 km^{2})
  - Land: 1.68 sq mi (4.34 km^{2})
  - Water: 0.027 sq mi (0.07 km^{2})
- Elevation: 666 ft (203 m)

Population (2020)
  - Total: 159
  - Density: 95.0/sq mi (36.68/km^{2})
- Time zone: UTC-6 (Central (CST))
  - Summer (DST): UTC-5 (CDT)
- ZIP codes: 74753
- FIPS code: 40-59500
- GNIS feature ID: 2629935

Platter is an unincorporated community in Bryan County, Oklahoma, United States. As of the 2020 census, Platter had a population of 159. Platter has a post office with the ZIP code 74753. The town was named after an A.F. Platter, who was a businessman from Denison, Texas.

== Demographics ==
Historical population
Census	Pop.	Note	%±
2020	159		—
U.S. Decennial Census

=== 2020 census ===
As of the 2020 census, Platter had a population of 159. The median age was 42.9 years. 23.3% of residents were under the age of 18 and 20.8% of residents were 65 years of age or older. For every 100 females there were 152.4 males, and for every 100 females age 18 and over there were 149.0 males age 18 and over.

0.0% of residents lived in urban areas, while 100.0% lived in rural areas.

There were 55 households in Platter, of which 38.2% had children under the age of 18 living in them. Of all households, 23.6% were married-couple households, 38.2% were households with a male householder and no spouse or partner present, and 23.6% were households with a female householder and no spouse or partner present. About 32.8% of all households were made up of individuals and 12.7% had someone living alone who was 65 years of age or older.

There were 76 housing units, of which 27.6% were vacant. The homeowner vacancy rate was 19.2% and the rental vacancy rate was 5.9%.

Racial composition as of the 2020 census
Race	Number	Percent
White	97	61.0%
Black or African American	1	0.6%
American Indian and Alaska Native	25	15.7%
Asian	0	0.0%
Native Hawaiian and Other Pacific Islander	0	0.0%
Some other race	2	1.3%
Two or more races	34	21.4%
Hispanic or Latino (of any race)	3	1.9%
