= Bennington, Oklahoma =

Town in Oklahoma, US

- [[Incorporated Town]]
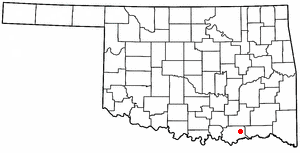
- Location of Bennington, Oklahoma
- Coordinates: 34°00′19″N 96°02′18″W
- Country: United States
- State: Oklahoma
- County: Bryan

Area
  - Total: 0.73 sq mi (1.90 km^{2})
  - Land: 0.73 sq mi (1.90 km^{2})
  - Water: 0 sq mi (0.00 km^{2})
- Elevation: 623 ft (190 m)

Population (2020)
  - Total: 282
  - Density: 384.7/sq mi (148.55/km^{2})
- Time zone: UTC-6 (Central (CST))
  - Summer (DST): UTC-5 (CDT)
- ZIP code: 74723
- Area code: 580
- FIPS code: 40-05400
- GNIS feature ID: 2411677
- Website: www.benningtonok.com

Bennington is an incorporated town in Bryan County, Oklahoma, United States. As of the 2020 census, Bennington had a population of 282.

== History ==
In 1853, a Presbyterian minister named A. G. Lansing established Mount Pleasant Mission Station near present-day Matoy in the Choctaw Nation, Indian Territory. Lansing turned the mission operation over to Rev. Charles C. Copeland, who moved the mission a few miles farther south because the original site was in a boggy and remote location that was unhealthy. Copeland renamed the mission Bennington Mission Station, honoring his home town of Bennington, Vermont. A post office was established in 1873, but closed in 1878. It was reestablished in 1884. The peak population during this period was 45 people.

At the time of its founding, Bennington was located in Blue County of the Choctaw Nation. In 1886 that portion of the county, along with portions of Atoka County and Kiamitia County, joined to form Jackson County, with its county seat at Pigeon Roost, near present-day Boswell.

The Arkansas and Choctaw Railway built through the area in 1902, and missed Bennington by two miles. Some of the buildings were dragged down to the railroad line, where a new town was established in 1903 and grew quickly to 250 people in that year. The 1910 census showed the population had about doubled to 513, then peaked at 915 in 1920, before falling to 492 in 1930.

== Geography ==
Bennington is located 20 miles (32 km) east of Durant on County Road E2075.

According to the United States Census Bureau, the town has a total area of 0.6 square miles (1.6 km^{2}), all land.

== Demographics ==
Historical population
Census	Pop.	Note	%±
1910	513		—
1920	951		85.4%
1930	492		−48.3%
1940	513		4.3%
1950	361		−29.6%
1960	226		−37.4%
1970	288		27.4%
1980	302		4.9%
1990	251		−16.9%
2000	289		15.1%
2010	334		15.6%
2020	282		−15.6%
U.S. Decennial Census

=== 2020 census ===
As of the 2020 census, Bennington had a population of 282. The median age was 34.5 years. 30.1% of residents were under the age of 18 and 11.0% of residents were 65 years of age or older. For every 100 females there were 95.8 males, and for every 100 females age 18 and over there were 95.0 males age 18 and over.

0.0% of residents lived in urban areas, while 100.0% lived in rural areas.

There were 102 households in Bennington, of which 41.2% had children under the age of 18 living in them. Of all households, 35.3% were married-couple households, 19.6% were households with a male householder and no spouse or partner present, and 33.3% were households with a female householder and no spouse or partner present. About 18.7% of all households were made up of individuals and 9.8% had someone living alone who was 65 years of age or older.

There were 122 housing units, of which 16.4% were vacant. The homeowner vacancy rate was 2.9% and the rental vacancy rate was 5.4%.

Racial composition as of the 2020 census
Race	Number	Percent
White	170	60.3%
Black or African American	1	0.4%
American Indian and Alaska Native	81	28.7%
Asian	1	0.4%
Native Hawaiian and Other Pacific Islander	0	0.0%
Some other race	1	0.4%
Two or more races	28	9.9%
Hispanic or Latino (of any race)	5	1.8%

=== 2000 census ===
As of the census of 2000, there were 289 people, 100 households, and 78 families residing in the town. The population density was 514.1 inhabitants per square mile (198.5/km^{2}). There were 124 housing units at an average density of 220.6 per square mile (85.2/km^{2}). The racial makeup of the town was 59.52% White, 36.68% Native American, 0.69% from other races, and 3.11% from two or more races. Hispanic or Latino of any race were 1.04% of the population.

There were 100 households, out of which 42.0% had children under the age of 18 living with them, 53.0% were married couples living together, 22.0% had a female householder with no husband present, and 22.0% were non-families. 20.0% of all households were made up of individuals, and 11.0% had someone living alone who was 65 years of age or older. The average household size was 2.89 and the average family size was 3.27.

In the town, the population was spread out, with 34.3% under the age of 18, 8.7% from 18 to 24, 28.0% from 25 to 44, 16.3% from 45 to 64, and 12.8% who were 65 years of age or older. The median age was 30 years. For every 100 females, there were 90.1 males. For every 100 females age 18 and over, there were 88.1 males.

The median income for a household in the town was $17,500, and the median income for a family was $21,667. Males had a median income of $23,750 versus $18,750 for females. The per capita income for the town was $7,414. About 35.3% of families and 37.9% of the population were below the poverty line, including 34.8% of those under the age of eighteen and 29.4% of those 65 or over.

== Notable people ==
- Shockley Shoemake, Oklahoma state legislator and lawyer.
- Wes Watkins, United States Representative.
