= Cade, Oklahoma =

Unincorporated community in Oklahoma, US

Cade
- Unincorporated community
- Location within the state of Oklahoma Cade (the United States)
- Coordinates: 34°05′55″N 95°59′24″W
- Country: United States
- State: Oklahoma
- County: Bryan
- Time zone: UTC-6 (Central (CST))
  - Summer (DST): UTC-5 (CDT)
- GNIS feature ID: 1100256

Cade is an unincorporated community in Bryan County, Oklahoma, United States. It is in northeastern Bryan County and had a post office from April 1, 1903, until October 31, 1915. Cade was named after Cassius M. Cade, a territorial political leader. At the time of its founding Cade was located in Jackson County, Choctaw Nation.
