= Romia, Oklahoma =

Unincorporated community in Oklahoma, US

- Unincorporated community
- Location within the state of Oklahoma Romia, Oklahoma (the United States)
- Coordinates: 33°50′N 96°10′W
- Country: United States
- State: Oklahoma
- County: Bryan
- Elevation: 489 ft (149 m)
- Time zone: UTC-6 (Central (CST))
  - Summer (DST): UTC-5 (CDT)
- Area code: 580
- GNIS feature ID: 1763553

Romia is an unincorporated community in Bryan County, Oklahoma, United States. It had a post office from August 30, 1915 until June 30, 1934. Romia was named after Romia Lewis, the daughter of the first postmaster, Ollie E. Lewis.
