= Garvin County Courthouse =

- U.S. National Register of Historic Places
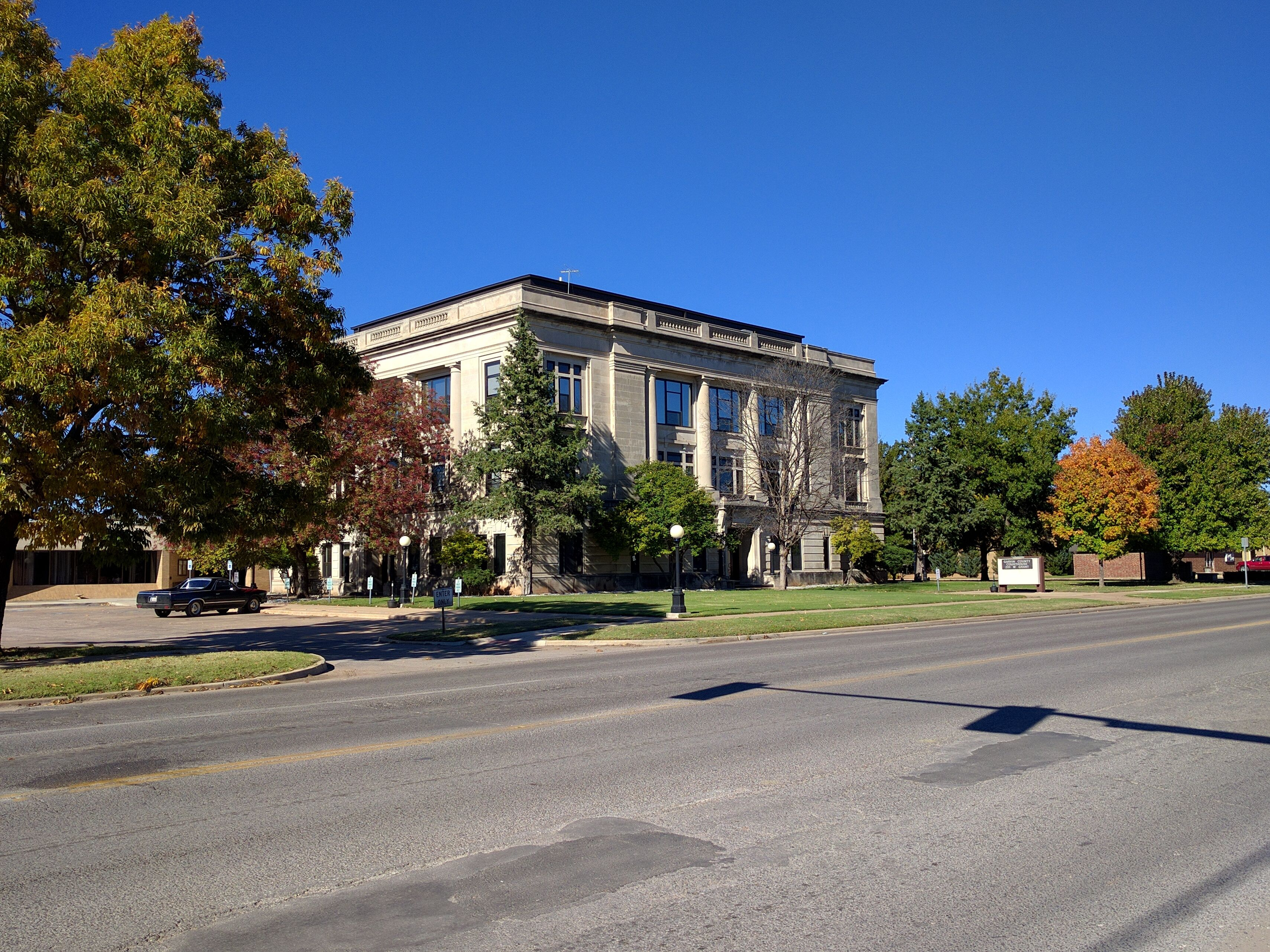

- Location within Oklahoma Location within the United States
- Interactive map showing the location of Garvin County Courthouse
- Location: Courthouse Sq. and Grant Ave., Pauls Valley, Oklahoma
- Coordinates: 34°44′25″N 97°13′18″W
- Area: 1 acre (0.40 ha)
- Built: 1918
- Built by: Manhattan Const. Co.
- Architect: Jewell Hicks
- Architectural style: Classical Revival
- Part of: Pauls Valley Historic District
- MPS: County Courthouses of Oklahoma TR
- NRHP reference No.: 85002758
- Added to NRHP: November 8, 1985

The Garvin County Courthouse, at Courthouse Sq. and Grant Ave. in Pauls Valley, Oklahoma, is a historic courthouse designed by architect Jewell Hicks. It was listed on the National Register of Historic Places in 1985.

It is also included in the Pauls Valley Historic District
