= Murray County Courthouse (Oklahoma) =

- U.S. National Register of Historic Places
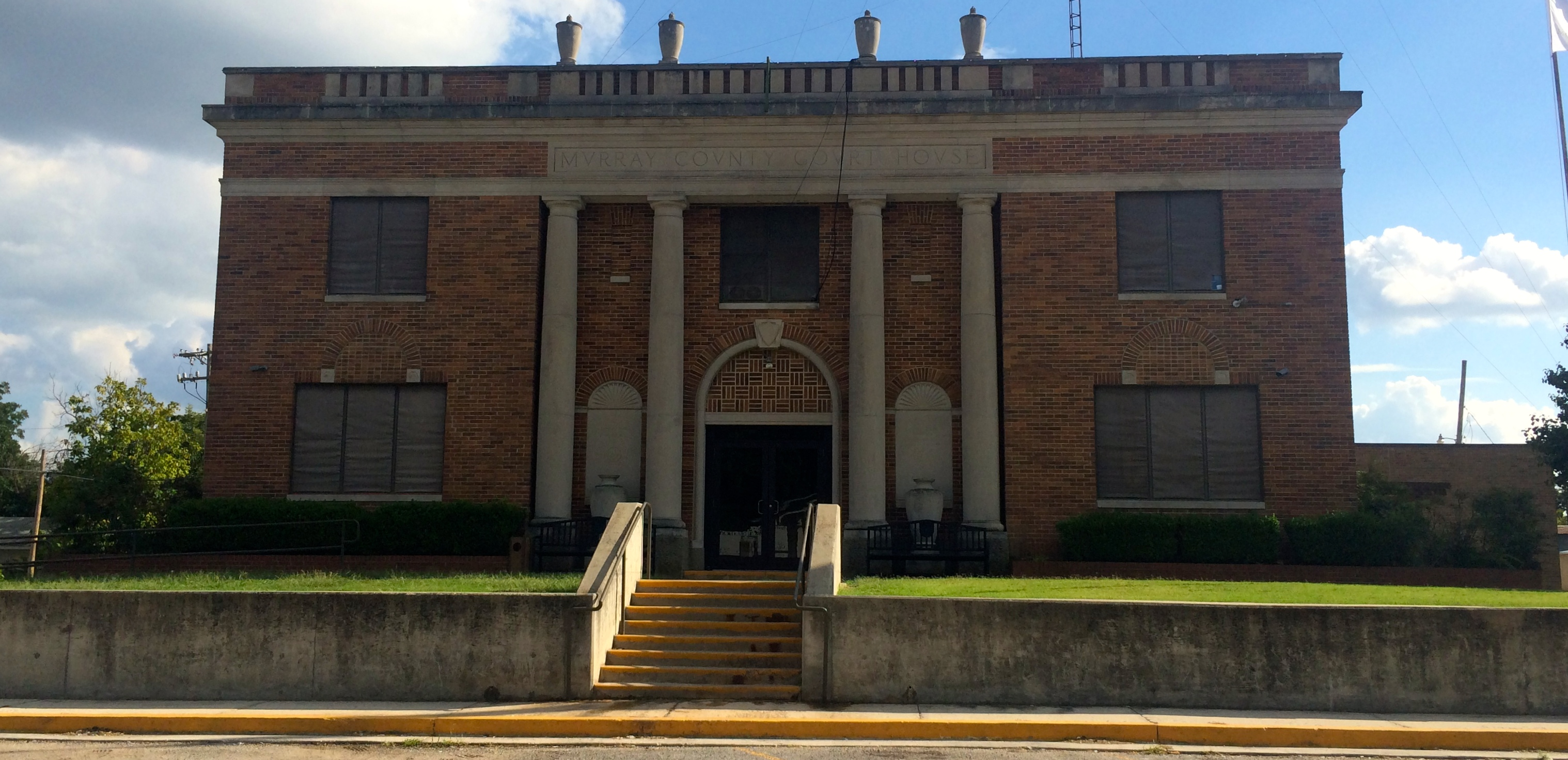

- Location within Oklahoma Location within the United States
- Interactive map showing the location of Murray County Courthouse
- Location: Wyandotte Ave., Sulphur, Oklahoma
- Coordinates: 34°30′17″N 96°58′29″W
- Area: 1 acre (0.40 ha)
- Built: 1923
- Built by: Jewell Hicks
- Architectural style: Classical Revival
- MPS: County Courthouses of Oklahoma TR
- NRHP reference No.: 84003352
- Added to NRHP: August 23, 1984

The Murray County Courthouse in Sulphur, Oklahoma, on Wyandotte Avenue between W. Tenth Street and W. Eleventh Street, is a historic Classical Revival-style courthouse that was built in 1923. It was listed on the National Register of Historic Places in 1984.

Designed by architect Jewell Hicks, it was listed on the National Register as part of a multiple property submission for numerous Oklahoma courthouses considered in a 1983 study.
