= Jewell Hicks =

American architect

Jewell Hicks was an architect in Oklahoma. He practiced on his own and at some point was a partner in Layton Hicks & Forsyth.

He designed a few courthouses in Oklahoma.

Several of his works are listed on the National Register of Historic Places.

Works include:

- Barnes-Steverson House, 3 Adams St., SE, Idabel, Oklahoma, NRHP-listed
- Bryan County Courthouse (Durant, Oklahoma), NRHP-listed
- Garvin County Courthouse, Courthouse Sq. and Grant Ave., Pauls Valley, Oklahoma, NRHP-listed
- Marshall County Courthouse (Madill, Oklahoma), Courthouse Sq., Madill, Oklahoma, NRHP-listed
- Murray County Courthouse (1923), Wyandotte Ave., Sulphur, Oklahoma, NRHP-listed
- One or more works in Historic Downtown Sulphur Commercial District, West Muskogee St., from W 1st St. to W 5th St., and W 5th. Sulphur, Oklahoma, NRHP-listed
