= Durant Downtown Historic District =

Historic district in Oklahoma, United States

- U.S. National Register of Historic Places
- U.S. Historic district
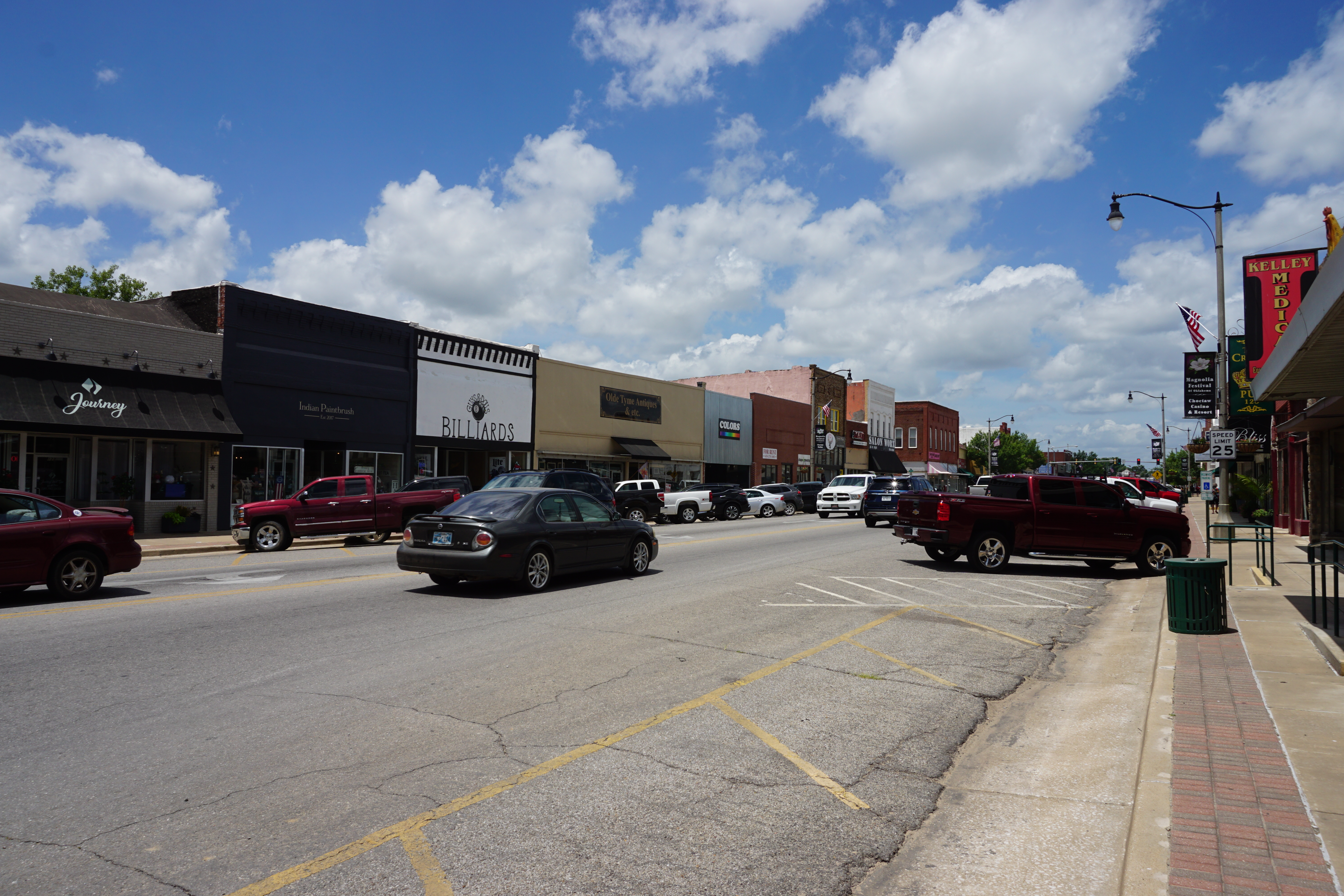
- Main Street in Durant, June 2018

- Location within Oklahoma Location within the United States
- Location: Roughly bounded by 4th Ave., Lost St., Evergreen St. and 1st Ave., Durant, Oklahoma
- Area: 28 acres (11 ha)
- Architect: Layton, Hicks & Forsyth
- Architectural style: Late Victorian, Late 19th And 20th Century Revivals
- NRHP reference No.: 07000517
- Added to NRHP: June 5, 2007

The Durant Downtown Historic District (DDHD) in Durant, Bryan County, Oklahoma is a 28 acres (11 ha) historic district which was listed on the National Register of Historic Places in 2007. It is roughly bounded by 4th Ave., Lost St., Evergreen St. and 1st Ave.

Although construction of Durant's downtown began in the early 1870s, there are no buildings remaining from the very early days. Most of those were hastily built of wood. At least two major fires consumed these downtown buildings. Hence, the Period of Significance for this district is listed as 1901–1957.

It includes work by architects Layton, Hicks & Forsyth. It included 48 contributing buildings, five contributing structures, and a contributing site, as well as 46 non-contributing buildings and two non-contributing structures.

It includes the J.L. Wilson Building, which is separately listed on the National Register. No buildings from Durant's founding era, the 1870s, survive.
