= Kiersey, Oklahoma =

Unincorporated community in Oklahoma, US

Keirsey, Oklahoma
- Unincorporated community
- Location within the state of Oklahoma Keirsey, Oklahoma (the United States)
- Coordinates: 34.005°N 96.465°W
- Country: United States
- State: Oklahoma
- County: Bryan
- Elevation: 748 ft (228 m)
- Time zone: UTC-6 (Central (CST))
  - Summer (DST): UTC-5 (CDT)
- Area code: 580
- GNIS feature ID: 1094371

Kiersey or Keirsey, also known as Mead Junction, is an unincorporated community in Bryan County, Oklahoma, United States. It is located about five mile west of Durant via US Route 70, then north on N3680 Rd (Silo Rd). The town had a post office from June 16, 1904, until November 30, 1920. Keirsey was named after William D. Keirsey, who was a local rancher.
