= Blue, Oklahoma =

Unincorporated community in Oklahoma, US

- Census-designated place
- Location in Oklahoma
- Coordinates: 33°59′24″N 96°13′49″W
- Country: United States
- State: Oklahoma
- County: Bryan

Area
  - Total: 2.52 sq mi (6.52 km^{2})
  - Land: 2.52 sq mi (6.52 km^{2})
  - Water: 0 sq mi (0.00 km^{2})
- Elevation: 581 ft (177 m)

Population (2020)
  - Total: 200
  - Density: 79.5/sq mi (30.69/km^{2})
- FIPS code: 40-06900
- GNIS feature ID: 2629909

Blue is an unincorporated community and census-designated place in Bryan County, Oklahoma, United States. It is located 9 miles (14 km) east of Durant, the county seat. It is named after the nearby Blue River. As of the 2020 census, Blue had a population of 200. Its post office was established on July 1, 1874.

At the time of its founding, Blue was located in Blue County, Choctaw Nation. In 1886 that portion of Blue County was joined by portions of Atoka County and Kiamitia County to form Jackson County. Jackson County's western border was the Blue River, just west of the village of Blue.

== Demographics ==
Historical population
Census	Pop.	Note	%±
2010	195		—
2020	200		2.6%
U.S. Decennial Census

=== 2020 census ===
As of the 2020 census, Blue had a population of 200. The median age was 43.5 years. 24.0% of residents were under the age of 18 and 22.5% of residents were 65 years of age or older. For every 100 females there were 110.5 males, and for every 100 females age 18 and over there were 120.3 males age 18 and over.

0.0% of residents lived in urban areas, while 100.0% lived in rural areas.

There were 86 households in Blue, of which 25.6% had children under the age of 18 living in them. Of all households, 29.1% were married-couple households, 41.9% were households with a male householder and no spouse or partner present, and 19.8% were households with a female householder and no spouse or partner present. About 44.2% of all households were made up of individuals and 30.2% had someone living alone who was 65 years of age or older.

There were 99 housing units, of which 13.1% were vacant. The homeowner vacancy rate was 0.0% and the rental vacancy rate was 0.0%.

Racial composition as of the 2020 census
Race	Number	Percent
White	150	75.0%
Black or African American	0	0.0%
American Indian and Alaska Native	23	11.5%
Asian	1	0.5%
Native Hawaiian and Other Pacific Islander	0	0.0%
Some other race	2	1.0%
Two or more races	24	12.0%
Hispanic or Latino (of any race)	11	5.5%

=== 2010 census ===
As of the 2010 United States census, the population of Blue was 195.
