= Bokchito, Oklahoma =

Town in Oklahoma, US

Bokchito, Oklahoma Bok Chito (Choctaw)
- Town
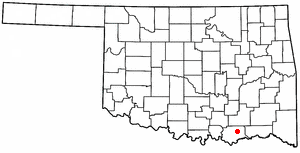
- Location of Bokchito, Oklahoma
- Coordinates: 34°00′55″N 96°08′41″W
- Country: United States
- State: Oklahoma
- County: Bryan

Area
  - Total: 0.68 sq mi (1.77 km^{2})
  - Land: 0.68 sq mi (1.77 km^{2})
  - Water: 0 sq mi (0.00 km^{2})
- Elevation: 633 ft (193 m)

Population (2020)
  - Total: 574
  - Density: 839.6/sq mi (324.19/km^{2})
- Time zone: UTC-6 (Central (CST))
  - Summer (DST): UTC-5 (CDT)
- ZIP code: 74726
- Area code: 580
- FIPS code: 40-07350
- GNIS feature ID: 2411703
- Website: www.townofbokchito.org

Bokchito is a town in Bryan County, Oklahoma, United States. As of the 2020 census, the community had 574 residents. It is located on the west side of what is now Bokchito Creek.

== History ==
A post office was established at Bokchito, Indian Territory on August 11, 1894. It was named for the local waterway, Bok Chito, which in the Choctaw language means "Big Creek." Bokchito, Indian Territory was platted and incorporated by the federal government as a town within the Choctaw Nation on April 27, 1901. At that time, the population was estimated at 200.

When founded, Bokchito was located in Blue County, a part of the Moshulatubbee District of the Choctaw Nation.

Since the 1970s Bokchito has been known as "The Biggest Little Town in Oklahoma"

Notable people connected to Bokchito include decorated Vietnam war veteran Paul Fredrick May and author Ramiro Pesina. Dennis Rodman lived in Bokchito when he was in college.

== Geography ==
Bokchito is located 13 miles (21 km) east of Durant and 37 miles (60 km) west of Hugo.

The town is at the intersection of U.S. Route 70 and Oklahoma State Highway 22.

According to the United States Census Bureau, the town has a total area of 0.4 square miles (1.0 km^{2}), all land.

== Demographics ==
Historical population
Census	Pop.	Note	%±
1910	535		—
1920	627		17.2%
1930	466		−25.7%
1940	581		24.7%
1950	643		10.7%
1960	620		−3.6%
1970	607		−2.1%
1980	628		3.5%
1990	576		−8.3%
2000	564		−2.1%
2010	632		12.1%
2020	574		−9.2%
U.S. Decennial Census

=== 2020 census ===
As of the 2020 census, Bokchito had a population of 574. The median age was 34.2 years. 24.9% of residents were under the age of 18 and 17.4% of residents were 65 years of age or older. For every 100 females there were 93.3 males, and for every 100 females age 18 and over there were 95.0 males age 18 and over.

0.0% of residents lived in urban areas, while 100.0% lived in rural areas.

There were 247 households in Bokchito, of which 34.0% had children under the age of 18 living in them. Of all households, 32.8% were married-couple households, 26.7% were households with a male householder and no spouse or partner present, and 32.8% were households with a female householder and no spouse or partner present. About 34.0% of all households were made up of individuals and 18.2% had someone living alone who was 65 years of age or older.

There were 294 housing units, of which 16.0% were vacant. The homeowner vacancy rate was 0.0% and the rental vacancy rate was 4.7%.

Racial composition as of the 2020 census
Race	Number	Percent
White	413	72.0%
Black or African American	7	1.2%
American Indian and Alaska Native	98	17.1%
Asian	0	0.0%
Native Hawaiian and Other Pacific Islander	0	0.0%
Some other race	13	2.3%
Two or more races	43	7.5%
Hispanic or Latino (of any race)	14	2.4%

=== 2000 census ===
As of the census of 2000, there were 564 people, 248 households, and 150 families residing in the town. The population density was 1,417.9 inhabitants per square mile (547.5/km^{2}). There were 293 housing units at an average density of 736.6 per square mile (284.4/km^{2}). The racial makeup of the town was 78.19% White, 13.65% Native American, 0.35% Asian, 0.35% from other races, and 7.45% from two or more races. Hispanic or Latino of any race were 1.77% of the population.

There were 248 households, out of which 27.0% had children under the age of 18 living with them, 46.0% were married couples living together, 10.5% had a female householder with no husband present, and 39.5% were non-families. 36.3% of all households were made up of individuals, and 19.8% had someone living alone who was 65 years of age or older. The average household size was 2.27 and the average family size was 2.97.

In the town, the population was spread out, with 23.4% under the age of 18, 10.5% from 18 to 24, 22.2% from 25 to 44, 25.7% from 45 to 64, and 18.3% who were 65 years of age or older. The median age was 39 years. For every 100 females, there were 80.8 males. For every 100 females age 18 and over, there were 81.5 males.

The median income for a household in the town was $21,923, and the median income for a family was $26,528. Males had a median income of $24,911 versus $20,000 for females. The per capita income for the town was $12,579. About 20.8% of families and 24.6% of the population were below the poverty line, including 34.5% of those under age 18 and 22.6% of those age 65 or over.

== Economy ==
The economy of the area around Bokchito is based on agriculture and the production of beef and dairy cattle. Important crops have included cotton, corn, peanuts, oats, hay, and cucumbers.

== Education ==
The towns of Bokchito and Blue consolidated their separate school districts to form the Rock Creek District. The elementary school is located in Blue, and the high school is in Bokchito.
