= Roberta, Oklahoma =

Unincorporated community in Oklahoma, US

- Unincorporated community
- Location within the state of Oklahoma Roberta, Oklahoma (the United States)
- Coordinates: 33.926°N 96.302°W
- Country: United States
- State: Oklahoma
- County: Bryan
- Elevation: 669 ft (204 m)
- Time zone: UTC-6 (Central (CST))
  - Summer (DST): UTC-5 (CDT)
- Area code: 580
- GNIS feature ID: 1097255

Roberta is an unincorporated community located in Bryan County, Oklahoma, United States. It had a post office from March 23, 1894 until February 15, 1930. Roberta was named after its first postmaster, James Roberts (1847-1946).
