= Albany, Oklahoma =

Unincorporated community in Oklahoma, US

- Census-designated place (CDP) & Unincorporated community
- Location within Oklahoma Location within the United States
- Coordinates: 33°52′37″N 96°09′36″W
- Country: United States
- State: Oklahoma
- County: Bryan

Area
  - Total: 4.15 sq mi (10.76 km^{2})
  - Land: 4.10 sq mi (10.63 km^{2})
  - Water: 0.050 sq mi (0.13 km^{2})
- Elevation: 581 ft (177 m)

Population (2020)
  - Total: 118
  - Density: 29/sq mi (11.1/km^{2})
- Time zone: UTC-6 (Central (CST))
  - Summer (DST): UTC-5 (Central Daylight (CDT))
- ZIP code: 74721
- Area code: 580
- FIPS code: 40-00950
- GNIS feature ID: 2629903

Albany is a census-designated place (CDP) and unincorporated community located in Bryan County, Oklahoma, United States, on State Highway 70E. The post office opened July 10, 1894. The community was named for Albany, New York. The population is 118 from the 2020 census, a decrease from 143 in 2010. The area code is 580.

== Demographics ==
Historical population
Census	Pop.	Note	%±
2010	143		—
2020	118		−17.5%
U.S. Decennial Census

=== 2020 census ===
As of the 2020 census, Albany had a population of 118. The median age was 44.4 years. 18.6% of residents were under the age of 18 and 19.5% of residents were 65 years of age or older. For every 100 females there were 145.8 males, and for every 100 females age 18 and over there were 140.0 males age 18 and over.

0.0% of residents lived in urban areas, while 100.0% lived in rural areas.

There were 55 households in Albany, of which 16.4% had children under the age of 18 living in them. Of all households, 49.1% were married-couple households, 21.8% were households with a male householder and no spouse or partner present, and 20.0% were households with a female householder and no spouse or partner present. About 29.1% of all households were made up of individuals and 21.8% had someone living alone who was 65 years of age or older.

There were 63 housing units, of which 12.7% were vacant. The homeowner vacancy rate was 0.0% and the rental vacancy rate was 0.0%.

Racial composition as of the 2020 census
Race	Number	Percent
White	103	87.3%
Black or African American	0	0.0%
American Indian and Alaska Native	3	2.5%
Asian	0	0.0%
Native Hawaiian and Other Pacific Islander	0	0.0%
Some other race	1	0.8%
Two or more races	11	9.3%
Hispanic or Latino (of any race)	2	1.7%

=== 2010 census ===
As of the 2010 census, the population was 143.
