= Bryan County, Oklahoma =

County in Oklahoma, United States

- County
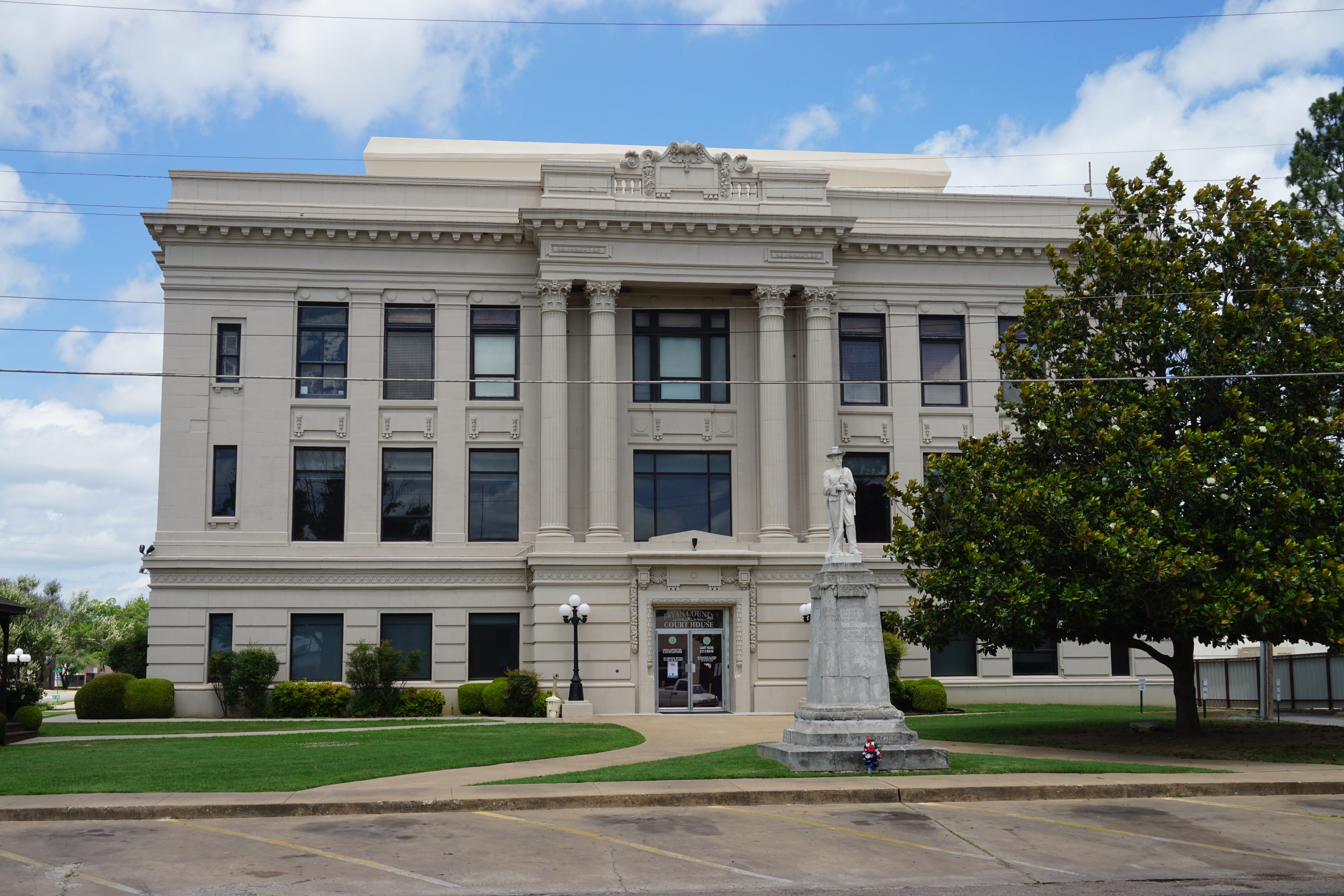
- Bryan County Courthouse

- Location within the U.S. state of Oklahoma
- Coordinates: 33°58′N 96°15′W
- Country: United States
- State: Oklahoma
- Founded: 1907
- Seat: Durant
- Largest city: Durant

Area
  - Total: 944 sq mi (2,440 km^{2})
  - Land: 904 sq mi (2,340 km^{2})
  - Water: 39 sq mi (100 km^{2}) 4.2%

Population (2020)
  - Total: 46,067
  - Estimate (2025): 51,367 ▲
  - Density: 51.0/sq mi (19.7/km^{2})
- Time zone: UTC−6 (Central)
  - Summer (DST): UTC−5 (CDT)
- Congressional district: 2nd
- Website: bryan.okcounties.org

Bryan County is a county in the U.S. state of Oklahoma. As of the 2020 census, the population was 46,067. Its county seat is Durant. It is the only county in the United States named for Democratic politician William Jennings Bryan.

Bryan County comprises the Durant, OK micropolitan statistical area, which is part of the Dallas-Fort Worth and the Texoma region, TX-OK combined statistical area. The city of Durant has the headquarters of the Choctaw Nation of Oklahoma.

Bryan County consists of 10 Townships: Albany, Bennington, Bokchito, Brown, Caddo, Calera, Colbert, Kemp, Matoy, and Speairs.

== History ==
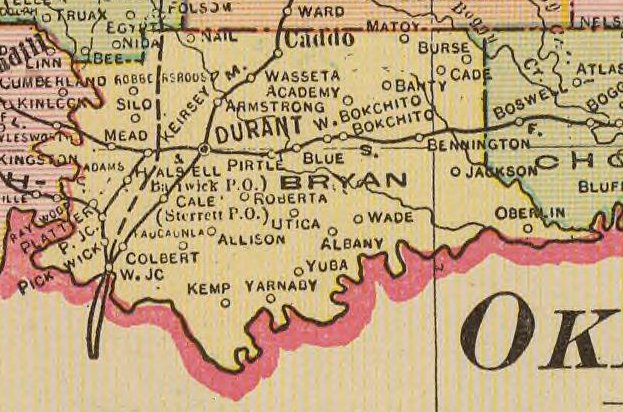
Map of Bryan County, 1909

The area now known as Bryan County was occupied by the Choctaw tribe in 1831–2. After the tribe reestablished its government in the Indian Territory, it included much of the area within Blue County, a part of the Pushmataha District of the Choctaw Nation.

In 1845, the tribe opened Armstrong Academy for boys near the community of Bokchito. The academy served as Chahta Tamaha, the Choctaw capital, during the Civil War.

Bloomfield Academy, a school for Chickasaw girls, was opened in 1852, just south of the present town of Achille.

Prior to the Chickasaw removal to Indian Territory, the Chickasaw tribe bought part of the Choctaw allocation. The western quarter of today's Bryan County was made part of the Chickasaw District in 1837. When the two tribes formally separated into two distinct nations in 1855, the Chickasaw District became the Chickasaw Nation.

During the late 1850s, the Butterfield Overland Mail and Stage route followed the older Texas Road across the present county. General Albert Pike established Fort McCulloch for the Confederate Army near the present town of Kenefic on the Blue River. Although no Civil War battles occurred in the vicinity, the fort was garrisoned by more than a thousand Indian troops whose leaders were allied with the Confederates.

After the Missouri, Kansas and Texas Railway (Katy) built a north–south line through this area in 1872, several new towns were created. One such town was Colbert, which became the seat of Blue County and the largest town in the Choctaw Nation. The St. Louis, San Francisco and New Orleans Railroad, later bought by the St. Louis and San Francisco Railway (Frisco), built an east–west line in 1903.

Just prior to statehood, when all tribal governments were dissolved, Blue County was extinguished. Bryan County was officially established on November 16, 1907, and Durant was designated as the county seat.

The Bridge War, also called the Red River Bridge War or the Toll Bridge War, was a 1931 bloodless boundary conflict between the U.S. states of Oklahoma and Texas over an existing toll bridge and a new free bridge crossing the Red River between Grayson County, Texas and Bryan County, Oklahoma.

== Geography ==
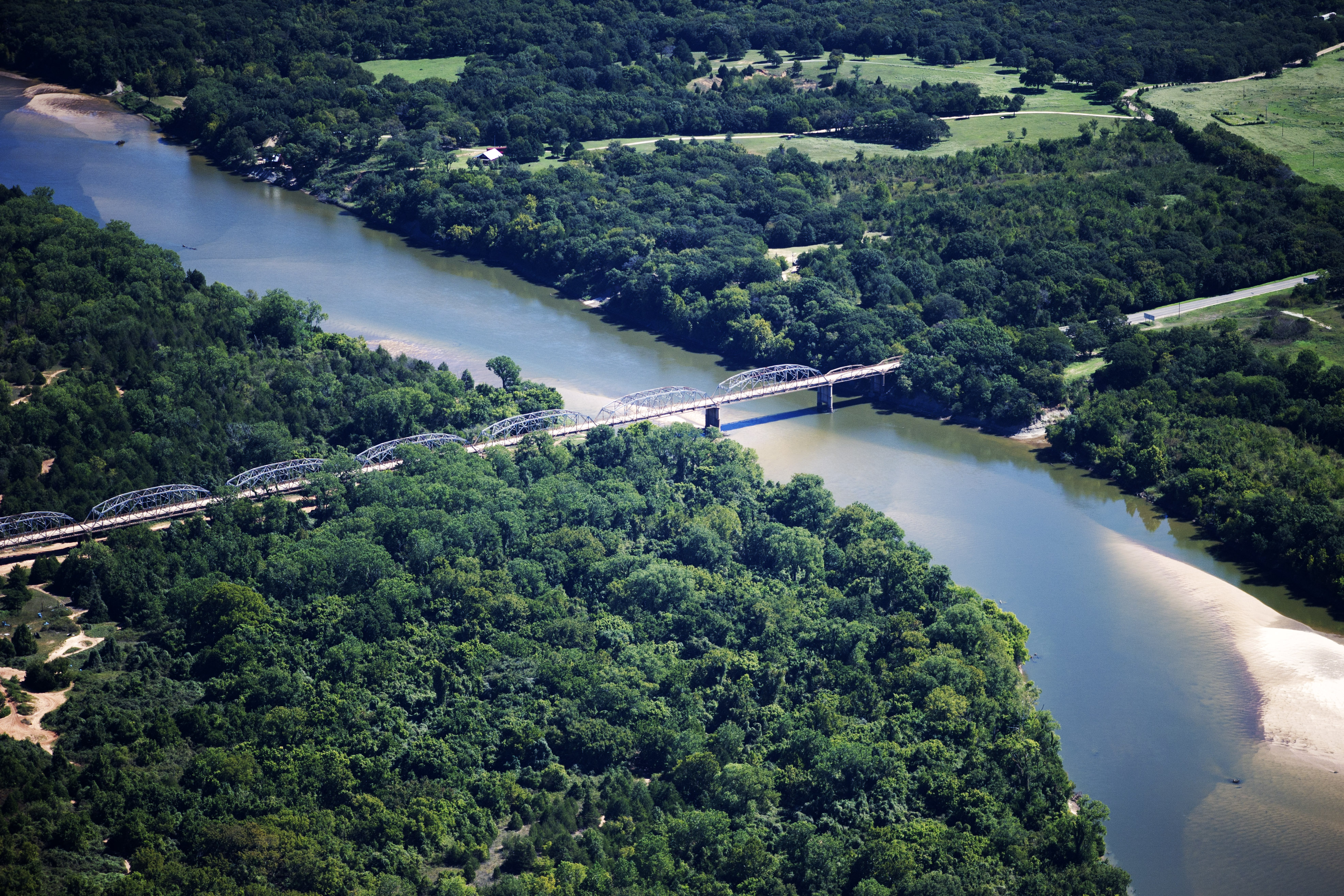
Aerial view of the State Highway No. 78 Bridge at the Red River

Bryan County is in southeastern Oklahoma, in a 10-county area designated as Choctaw Country for tourism purposes by the Oklahoma Department of Tourism and Recreation. According to the U.S. Census Bureau, the county has a total area of 944 square miles (2,440 km^{2}), of which 904 square miles (2,340 km^{2}) is land and 39 square miles (100 km^{2}) (4.2%) is water.

The county is in the Coastal Plains physiographic region, and is drained mostly by the Blue River. The Washita River originally drained much of the western part of the county, but now empties into Lake Texoma, which forms much of the southern boundary of the county. The county is a major part of the Texoma region.

=== Major highways ===
- US-69
- US-70
- US-75
- SH-91
- SH-70E
- SH-48
- SH-199
- SH-78

=== Adjacent counties ===
- Atoka County (north)
- Choctaw County (east, and northeast)
- Lamar County, Texas (southeast)
- Fannin County, Texas (south)
- Grayson County, Texas (southwest)
- Marshall County (west)
- Johnston County (northwest)

== Demographics ==
Historical population
Census	Pop.	Note	%±
1910	29,854		—
1920	40,700		36.3%
1930	32,277		−20.7%
1940	38,138		18.2%
1950	28,999		−24.0%
1960	24,252		−16.4%
1970	25,552		5.4%
1980	30,535		19.5%
1990	32,089		5.1%
2000	36,534		13.9%
2010	42,416		16.1%
2020	46,067		8.6%
2025 (est.)	51,367	▲	11.5%
U.S. Decennial Census; 1790-1960 1900-1990; 1990-2000 2010

=== 2020 census ===
As of the 2020 United States census, the county had a population of 46,067. Of the residents, 23.4% were under the age of 18 and 17.7% were 65 years of age or older; the median age was 36.9 years. For every 100 females there were 95.8 males, and for every 100 females age 18 and over there were 93.8 males.

The racial makeup of the county was 67.3% White, 1.6% Black or African American, 14.8% American Indian and Alaska Native, 0.6% Asian, 3.0% from some other race, and 12.6% from two or more races. Hispanic or Latino residents of any race comprised 7.4% of the population.

There were 17,954 households in the county, of which 31.8% had children under the age of 18 living with them and 27.8% had a female householder with no spouse or partner present. About 27.2% of all households were made up of individuals and 12.0% had someone living alone who was 65 years of age or older.

There were 20,366 housing units, of which 11.8% were vacant. Among occupied housing units, 62.6% were owner-occupied and 37.4% were renter-occupied. The homeowner vacancy rate was 1.4% and the rental vacancy rate was 7.5%.

=== 2000 census ===
As of the census of 2000, there were 36,534 people, 14,422 households, and 9,936 families residing in the county. The population density was 40 people per square mile (15 people/km^{2}). There were 16,715 housing units at an average density of 18 units per square mile (6.9/km^{2}). The racial makeup of the county was 80.02% White, 1.42% Black or African American, 12.16% Native American, 0.44% Asian, 0.04% Pacific Islander, 1.08% from other races, and 4.84% from two or more races; 2.65% of the population were Hispanic or Latino of any race. 28.4% were of American, 10.1% Irish, 8.1% German and 6.7% English ancestry.

In 2000, there were 14,422 households, out of which 30.40% had children under the age of 18 living with them, 54.00% were married couples living together, 10.80% had a female householder with no husband present, and 31.10% were non-families. 26.60% of all households were made up of individuals, and 11.50% had someone living alone who was 65 years of age or older. The average household size was 2.47 and the average family size was 2.98. In the county, the population was spread out, with 24.80% under the age of 18, 11.70% from 18 to 24, 25.70% from 25 to 44, 22.30% from 45 to 64, and 15.40% who were 65 years of age or older. The median age was 36 years. For every 100 females there were 95.10 males. For every 100 females age 18 and over, there were 92.40 males.

According to the 2000 census, the median income for a household in the county was $27,888, and the median income for a family was $33,984. Males had a median income of $26,831 versus $20,087 for females. The per capita income for the county was $14,217. About 14.00% of families and 18.40% of the population were below the poverty line, including 21.40% of those under age 18 and 17.00% of those age 65 or over.

== Politics ==
Voter Registration and Party Enrollment as of May 31, 2023
Party	Number of Voters	Percentage
Democratic	7,171	28.11%
Republican	13,829	54.21%
Others	4,508	17.67%
Total	25,508	100%

United States presidential election results for Bryan County, Oklahoma
Year	Republican		Democratic		Third party(ies)	
Year	No.	%	No.	%	No.	%
1908	1,044	27.93%	2,215	59.26%	479	12.81%
1912	711	18.49%	2,278	59.25%	856	22.26%
1916	1,267	25.30%	2,974	59.40%	766	15.30%
1920	3,127	38.83%	4,502	55.90%	424	5.27%
1924	1,780	25.17%	4,593	64.95%	699	9.88%
1928	3,014	43.37%	3,885	55.90%	51	0.73%
1932	825	9.70%	7,681	90.30%	0	0.00%
1936	1,362	14.35%	8,106	85.43%	20	0.21%
1940	2,190	19.36%	9,095	80.42%	25	0.22%
1944	1,677	18.90%	7,180	80.91%	17	0.19%
1948	1,366	14.99%	7,748	85.01%	0	0.00%
1952	3,340	33.14%	6,739	66.86%	0	0.00%
1956	2,939	33.91%	5,729	66.09%	0	0.00%
1960	3,845	46.48%	4,428	53.52%	0	0.00%
1964	2,652	30.89%	5,934	69.11%	0	0.00%
1968	2,727	33.24%	3,214	39.17%	2,264	27.59%
1972	5,397	61.91%	3,144	36.06%	177	2.03%
1976	2,848	27.67%	7,410	71.99%	35	0.34%
1980	3,980	37.61%	6,410	60.57%	192	1.81%
1984	6,246	53.07%	5,475	46.52%	48	0.41%
1988	4,615	40.13%	6,849	59.55%	37	0.32%
1992	3,452	25.63%	6,259	46.47%	3,757	27.90%
1996	3,943	34.79%	5,962	52.60%	1,430	12.62%
2000	6,084	51.80%	5,554	47.28%	108	0.92%
2004	8,615	59.99%	5,745	40.01%	0	0.00%
2008	9,307	67.77%	4,426	32.23%	0	0.00%
2012	9,520	72.12%	3,681	27.88%	0	0.00%
2016	10,478	75.83%	2,804	20.29%	536	3.88%
2020	12,344	77.27%	3,323	20.80%	309	1.93%
2024	13,999	78.59%	3,569	20.04%	244	1.37%

== Economy ==
Agriculture, tourism, manufacturing, and distribution are bedrocks of the county's economy. Tourism attractions include Lake Texoma, Lake Durant, the Choctaw Casino Resort, Choctaw Casino Bingo and Fort Washita.

Major employers in the region include the Choctaw Nation of Oklahoma, the headquarters of the J.C. Potter meat processing facility, Durant's Historic Central Business District and Retail District, a Cardinal Glass Industries manufacturing facility, AllianceHealth Durant, a Big Lots distribution center, the headquarters of First United Bank and First Texoma National Bank, Indian Nation Wholesale, and Wal-Mart.

== Communities ==
=== City ===
- Durant (county seat)

=== Towns ===
- Achille
- Armstrong
- Bennington
- Bokchito
- Caddo
- Calera
- Colbert
- Hendrix
- Kemp
- Kenefic
- Mead
- Silo

=== Census-designated places ===
- Albany
- Blue
- Cartwright
- Platter
- Sand Point
- Utica

=== Other unincorporated communities ===
- Allison
- Banty
- Brown
- Cade
- Cobb
- Kiersey
- Romia
- Roberta
- Yarnaby
- Yuba

== NRHP sites ==
The following sites in Bryan county are on the National Register of Historic Places.

- Bloomfield Academy Site, Achille vicinity
- Armstrong Academy Site, Bokchito vicinity
- Caddo Community Building, Caddo
- Colbert's Ferry Site, Colbert vicinity
- Durant Downtown Historic District, Durant
- Bryan County Courthouse, Durant
- Robert E. Lee School, Durant
- Oklahoma Presbyterian College, Durant
- Robert Lee Williams Public Library, Durant
- J. L. Wilson Building, Durant
- Carriage Point (Fisher's Station), Durant
- Roberta School Campus, Durant
- State Highway No. 78 Bridge at the Red River, Karma vicinity
- Fort McCulloch, Kenefic vicinity
- Nail's Station, Kenefic vicinity
- Fort Washita, Nida vicinity
