= Yarnaby, Oklahoma =

Unincorporated community in Oklahoma, US

- Unincorporated community
- Location within the state of Oklahoma Yarnaby, Oklahoma (the United States)
- Coordinates: 33.790°N 96.256°W
- Country: United States
- State: Oklahoma
- County: Bryan
- Time zone: UTC-6 (Central (CST))
  - Summer (DST): UTC-5 (CDT)
- Area code: 580
- GNIS feature ID: 1100041

Yarnaby is an unincorporated community in Bryan County, Oklahoma, United States. It is about 23 miles southeast of Durant off Oklahoma State Highway 78 on Yarnaby Rd. The locale had a post office from January 22, 1883, until the end of June, 1957. The name is said to be Choctaw for “to go and kill.”
