= Red River Bridge War =

1931 boundary conflict between the U.S. states of Oklahoma and Texas

Date	1931
Location	Texas–Oklahoma border, U.S.
Result	Oklahoma Victory

Belligerents
Oklahoma	Texas

Commanders and leaders
William Murray; Robert Burns	Ross Sterling; Edgar Witt

Units involved
Oklahoma National Guard: Oklahoma Army National Guard	Texas Military Forces: Texas Army National Guard; Texas Air National Guard; Texas Ranger Division

Strength
At least 500 Oklahoma National Guard soldiers • 1 Machine Gun Platoon • 1 Howitzer Cannon	At least 3 Texas Rangers

Casualties and losses
None	barricades destroyed but later rebuilt

The Red River Bridge War was a boundary conflict between the U.S. states of Oklahoma and Texas over an existing toll bridge and a new free bridge crossing the Red River.

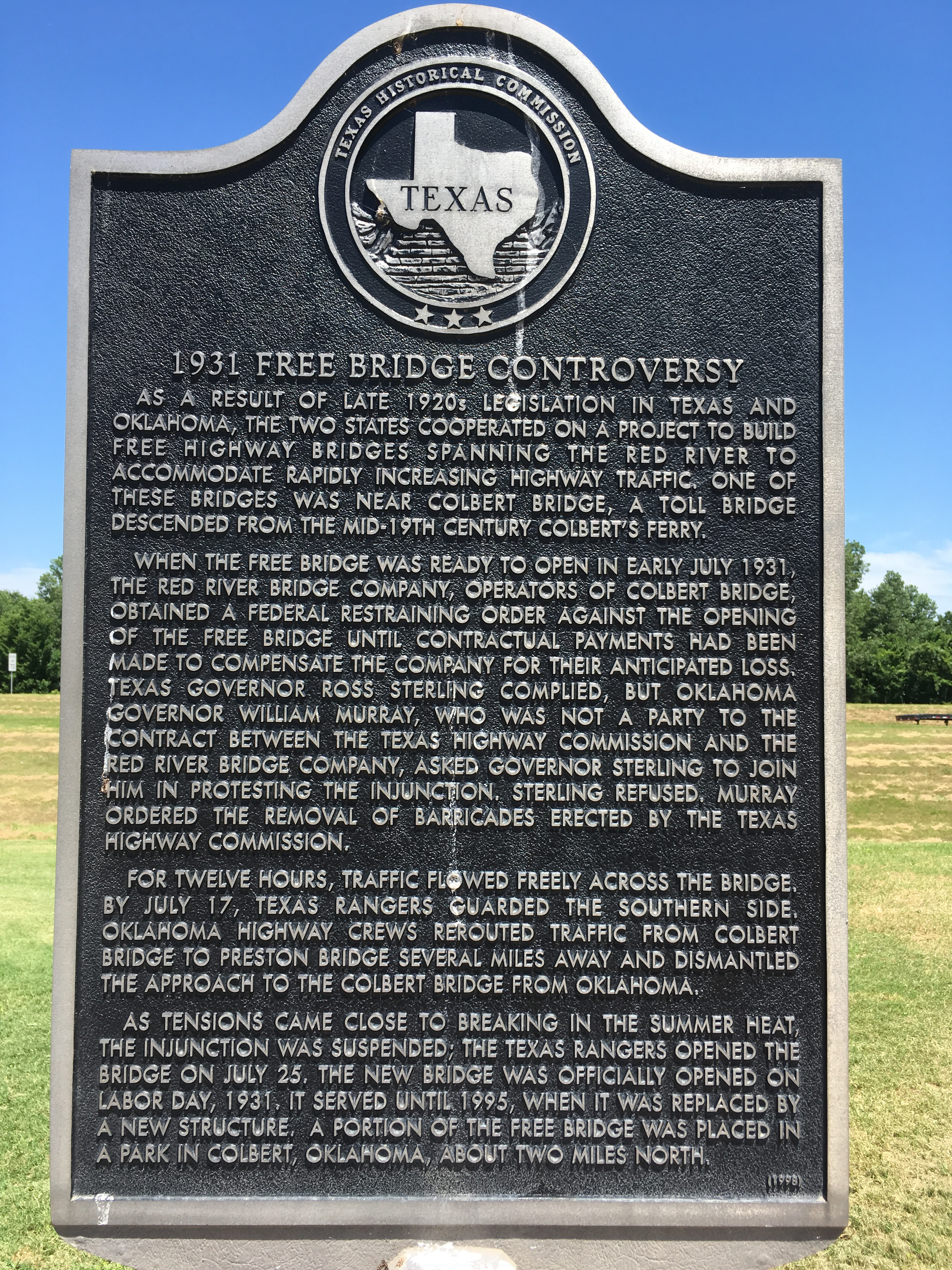
Historical marker about the controversy, located at Texas welcome center, just south of the Oklahoma border

The Red River Bridge Company, a private firm owned by Benjamin Colbert, had been operating a toll bridge that carried U.S. Route 69 and U.S. Route 75 between Colbert, Oklahoma, and Denison, Texas. In 1931, Texas and Oklahoma jointly built a new, free span northwest of the existing toll bridge.

On July 10, 1931, the Red River Bridge Company obtained an injunction against the Texas Highway Commission (which oversaw the Texas Highway Department, now Texas Department of Transportation), keeping it from opening the new bridge. The company said that the highway commission had promised in July 1930 to buy the old toll bridge for $60,000 (equal to $1,156,375 today). In reaction to the injunction, Texas Governor Ross S. Sterling ordered that the new free bridge be barricaded at the Texas end.

On July 17, Oklahoma Governor William "Alfalfa Bill" Murray ordered the new bridge open by executive order. Murray issued this order on the grounds that the land on both sides of the river belonged to Oklahoma, per the Adams–Onís Treaty of 1819. Murray sent highway crews across the new bridge to destroy the barricades.

Governor Sterling sent Adjutant General William Warren Sterling and three Texas Rangers to the new bridge to defend the Texas Highway Department workers enforcing the injunction, and rebuilt the barricade that night. The next day, Oklahoma crews under Governor Murray's order demolished the Oklahoma approach to the toll bridge, rendering that bridge impassable.

The Texas State Legislature called a special session on July 23 to pass a bill allowing the Red River Bridge Company to sue the state over the issue, partially in response to meetings in Sherman and Denison, Texas, demanding the free bridge be opened. The next day, Governor Murray declared martial law at the site, enforced by Oklahoma National Guardsmen, and personally appeared at the site, armed with a revolver, hours before a Muskogee, Oklahoma, court issued an injunction prohibiting him from blocking the northern toll bridge approach. Murray directed the guardsmen to allow anyone to cross either bridge.

Murray discovered on July 27 that the free bridge was in danger of being closed permanently. He expanded the martial-law zone across the river, stationing guardsmen on both free bridge approaches. The injunction against the bridge opening was dissolved and the martial law order rescinded on August 6.

News of the dispute made national and international headlines. Adolf Hitler may have believed that the events were evidence of infighting between the American states, weakening the union.

The free bridge that was the cause of the dispute was opened on Labor Day, September 7, 1931. It was replaced in 1995, though a portion of the bridge was saved as a historical attraction and relocated to the Colbert City park in Colbert, Oklahoma.
