= Blue River (Oklahoma) =

Coordinates: 33°53′11″N 95°55′57″W

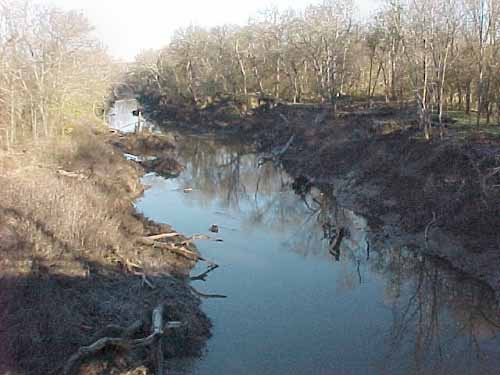

Location
- County: Murray
- County: Pontotoc
- County: Johnston
- County: Bryan

Physical characteristics
- Source
  - location: near Roff, Oklahoma
- Mouth: Red River
- Length: 141 mi (227 km)
- Basin size: 670 mi^{2} (1,700 km^{2})
- Discharge
  - location: Blue
  - average: 320 cu ft/s (9.1 m^{3}/s)

Basin features
- River system: Red River

The Blue River is a 141-mile-long (227 km) tributary of the Red River in southern Oklahoma in the United States. Via the Red River, it is part of the watershed of the Mississippi River. According to the Geographic Names Information System, the river has also been known as Blue Creek. The Board on Geographic Names settled on "Blue River" as the stream's official name in 1977.

A clear water stream in its upper course, the Blue River is important for recreation, especially fishing. Several areas along the river are owned by the state of Oklahoma and the Nature Conservancy.

== Course ==
The Blue River originates in southeastern Murray County, 2 miles (3 km) southwest of Roff. It flows east into Pontotoc County and turns southeast through Johnston and Bryan counties, past the town of Milburn and within 3 miles (4.8 km) of Durant. It joins the Red River in southeastern Bryan County. The river basin is long and narrow, draining an area of 1,750 km^{2} (680 sq mi) (670 sq. mi). In contrast to the upper river, clear (except after rains), spring-fed, and fast-flowing, the lower river is "deep and muddy."

The Blue River is one of the last free flowing streams in Oklahoma; water flows from its source to its mouth without dams or other man-made structures controlling the flow of water. Fish include smallmouth, spotted, and largemouth bass, crappie, catfish, and a varied community of panfish including the long ear, redbreast, redear, and green sunfish. Trout are stocked in the river at the Blue River Fishing Area north of Tishomingo, making it a designated Oklahoma trout stream from November 1 till March 31. This brings anglers to fish for rainbow and brown trout during the winter when the river waters are at their coldest.

== Conservation ==
The upper one-half of the Blue River transverses the Arbuckle Plains, a limestone area with many springs and caves. Underlying the region is the Arbuckle Simpson Aquifer, a source of drinking water for nearby cities and towns. The Blue River receives its water from both precipitation runoff and springs, the spring water accounting for the clarity of the water of the upper Blue River in a region in which most rivers are muddy. The upper Blue has many gentle rapids and low waterfalls as it cuts through limestone outcrops and flows over travertine ledges. The shallow rocky soil has inhibited cultivation and most of the watershed of the upper Blue is unplowed. Vegetation mostly consists of prairie and Cross Timbers oak forest with an oak/elm/hickory/pecan bottomland forest adjacent to the river. The Blue River is home to the endangered seaside alder found only in coastal Maryland, Delaware, and the Blue River in Oklahoma.

The uniqueness of the Blue River has led to conservation efforts. 3,367 acres (1,363 ha) along 9 km (5.6 miles) of the river north and south of State Highway 7 are owned by the Oklahoma Department of Wildlife Conservation with fishing, hunting, and hiking permitted. Canoeing and kayaking is popular along 9.5 miles of the river which has class II and III rapids, dropping over about 50 ledges and waterfalls from 2 to 12 feet high. Floating is best in the winter and spring as the river is too low in the summer except after rains.

The greatest threat to the Blue River is the withdrawal of water for human use from the Arbuckle-Simpson Aquifer. Withdrawal exceeds recharge which reduces the flow of the river. In 2011, to help protect the aquifer and the land, the Nature Conservancy purchased 490 acres of land along the river near Connerville. The preserve was named the Oka' Yanahli, which in the Chickasaw language means "water flowing." This area belonged to the Chickasaw Indians during the 19th century.

Another threat to the river is the fact that, over the last 200 years, native trees were cut down along its banks to provide for hay meadows, which in turn opens the door to erosion problems. The Nature Conservancy and other groups are cooperating to plant a variety of trees along the river’s route, and helping other private landowners do the same.

== See also ==
- List of Oklahoma rivers
- Columbia Gazetteer of North America entry
- DeLorme (2003). Oklahoma Atlas & Gazetteer. Yarmouth, Maine: DeLorme. ISBN 0-89933-283-8.
