= Colbert's Ferry =

Texas–Indian Territory river crossing

- Colbert's Ferry Site
- U.S. National Register of Historic Places
- Location within Oklahoma Location within the United States
- Nearest city: Colbert, Oklahoma
- Coordinates: 33°49′13″N 96°31′20″W
- Built: 1853
- NRHP reference No.: 72001057
- Added to NRHP: June 29, 1972

Colbert's Ferry was an important Red River crossing between Texas and Indian Territory from about 1853 to 1899. Both the Texas Road and the Butterfield Overland Mail route crossed here. It was located on the Texas Road about 3 miles (4.8 km) southeast of present–day Colbert, Bryan County, Oklahoma. The nearest town on the Texas side of the river is Denison.

The Missouri, Kansas and Texas Railway (MK&T) built a railroad bridge nearby across the Red River in 1872, which caused Colbert's Ferry to lose a significant amount of traffic. Frank Colbert, the ferry owner, responded by building his own toll bridge, which replaced the ferry. A flood soon washed away both bridges. Meanwhile, he resumed operating the ferry.

== Pre-Civil War ==
According to the Texas State Historical Association (TSHA), Joseph Mitchell, a Chickasaw farmer began operating a ferry service across the Red River about 1842. The service continued until Mitchell died in 1847. In 1849, Benjamin F. "Frank" Colbert, also a Chickasaw citizen, had moved to this area in the late 1840s, built a house and began to raise cotton and cattle, employing slave labor. In 1853, he got permission from the Chickasaw Nation to establish a ferry across the Red River. Later, he operated Colbert's Station in his house at the same location when the Butterfield Overland Mail company established its stage route. (Note: Colbert had already built a mansion named "Riverside" nearby, so the original house became the station and the place where he could feed station passengers.) Colbert transported Butterfield's passengers across the river at no charge. The Colbert post office was opened November 17, 1853, with Walter D. Collins as postmaster.

== Post Civil War ==
The Butterfield Stage ceased operating in this area during the Civil War, but Confederate troops frequently crossed the ferry when moving between Texas and Indian Territory. After the war ended, Colbert's operations became profitable again because of the cattle drives from Texas to northern markets. The town of Colbert began growing around the station. Travelers had to pay to cross the river in either direction, regardless of whether they used the ferry. According to the Encyclopedia of Oklahoma History and Culture, the rate schedule in 1872 was: "one dollar for a two-horse wagon, one dollar and twenty-five cents for a four-horse wagon, one dollar and fifty cents for six-horse wagon, twenty-five cents for a man and a horse, and ten cents a head for cattle or horses."

The Missouri, Kansas and Texas Railway (MK&T) built its own railroad bridge across the Red River in 1872 and began drawing traffic at the expense of Colbert's ferry. Colbert got federal permission to build his own bridge in 1874. A major flood destroyed both bridges about a year later, so Colbert quickly put his old ferry back in service. He then sold his bridge charter to the Red River Bridge Company, which completed a new one in 1892. (Note: Colbert himself was one of the owners of the Red River Bridge Company.) This bridge was also destroyed by a flood in 1908, but the bridge company quickly replaced it. This structure was replaced in 1931 by a new free bridge, after it had triggered a conflict between Oklahoma and Texas known as the Red River Bridge War. After the conflict was resolved, Colbert's old bridge was dismantled.

Colbert's Ferry was added to the National Register of Historic Places (#72001057) in 1972. Only the footings of B.F. Colbert's house are still visible.

== Sources ==
- Britton, Morris L. (June 12, 2010). "Colbert's Ferry". Handbook of Texas. Denton, TX: Texas State Historical Association.
- Morrison, W.B. (September 1938). "Colbert's Ferry on Red River, Chickasaw Nation, Indian Territory: Recollections of John Malcolm, Pioneer Ferryman". The Chronicles of Oklahoma. Vol. 16, no. 3. Oklahoma City, OK: Oklahoma Historical Society. pp. 302–314. Archived from the original on April 5, 2015.
