= Oklahoma Presbyterian College =

Historic church in Oklahoma, United States

- U.S. National Register of Historic Places
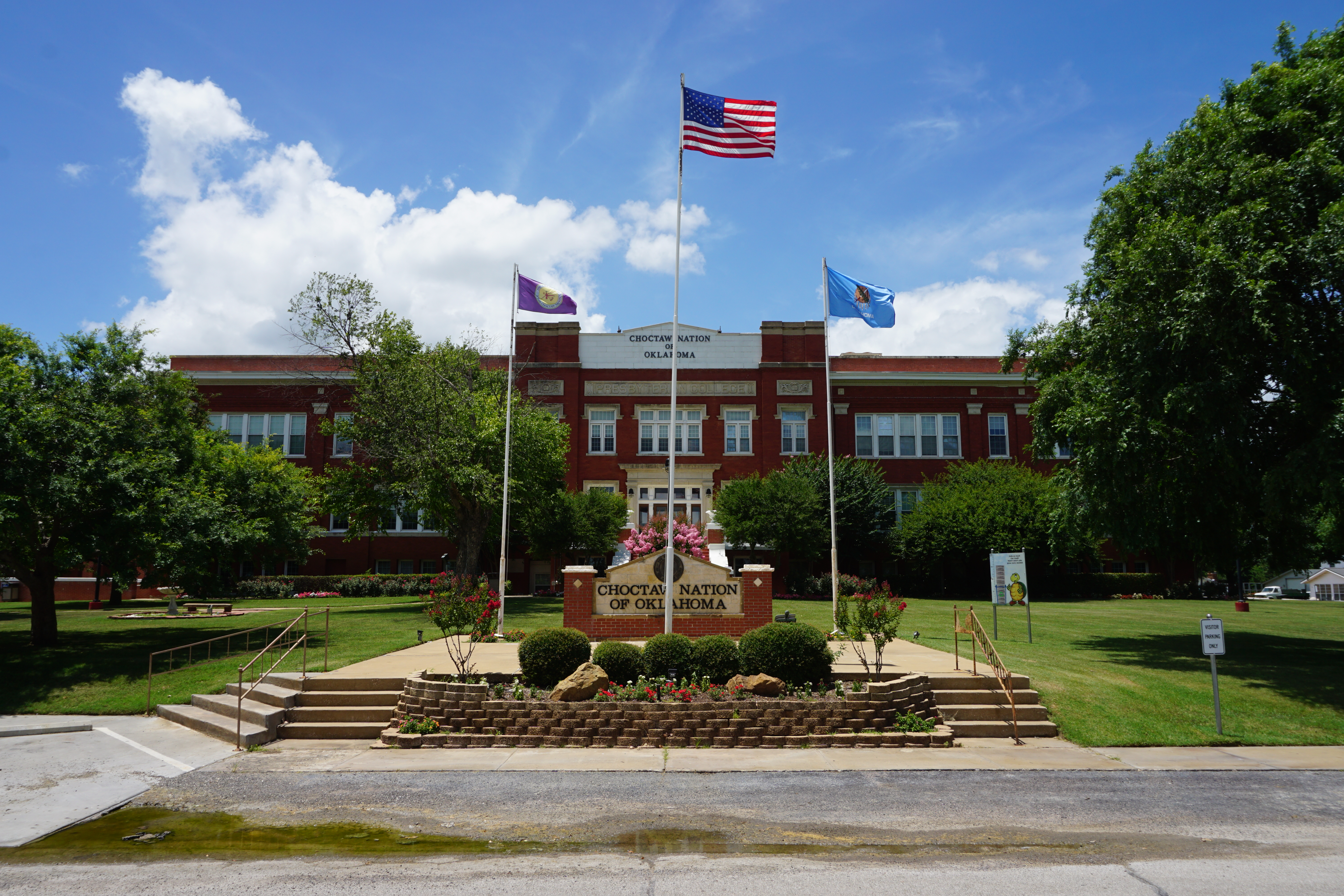

- Location within Oklahoma Location within the United States
- Location: 601 N. 16th St., Durant, Oklahoma
- Coordinates: 34°00′00″N 96°23′36″W
- Area: 4 acres (1.6 ha)
- Built: 1909-10, 1918
- NRHP reference No.: 76001556
- Added to NRHP: December 12, 1976

Oklahoma Presbyterian College (also known as Oklahoma Presbyterian College for Girls) is a historic Presbyterian school at 601 N. 16th Street in Durant, Oklahoma. The site, including two contributing buildings, was added to the National Register of Historic Places in 1976.

The main building is a three-story building, built during 1909-1910 of red brick with white stone trim. It is 50 by 160 feet (15 m × 49 m) in plan and served as a combination school and dormitory, and was built at cost of $100,000.

The second building, built in 1918, is also three stories but is more modest, and is 32 by 80 feet (9.8 m × 24.4 m) in plan.

In 1976 the two buildings served as headquarters and museum of the Red River Valley Historical Society.

Beginning in 1975, the building functioned as the Choctaw Nation's administrative headquarters until 2018 when the headquarters was relocated to a newly constructed building. The building still houses some Choctaw Nation employees, but remains largely empty since the move.
