= Robert Lee Williams Public Library =

Historic public library in Oklahoma, United States

- U.S. National Register of Historic Places
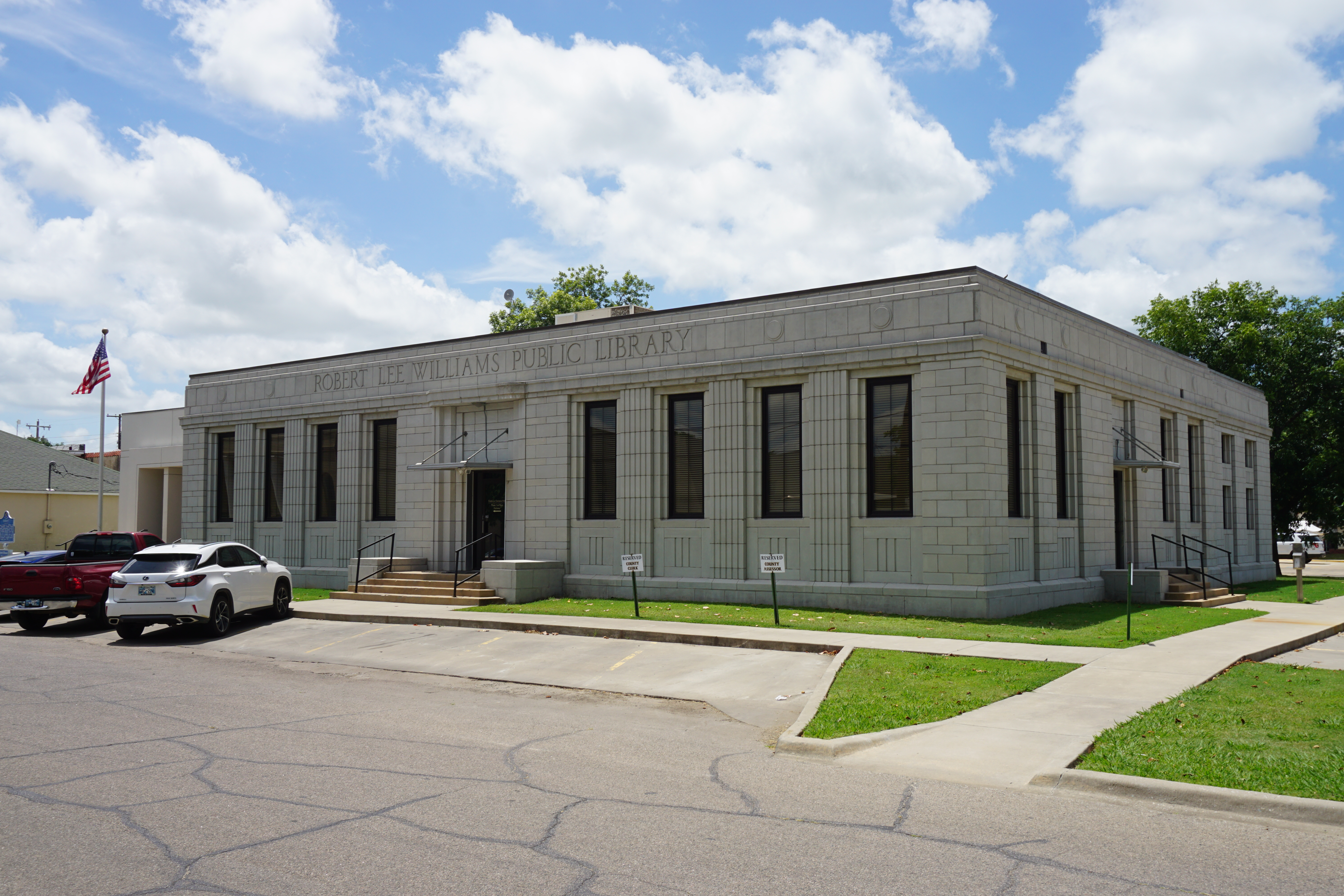

- Location within Oklahoma Location within the United States
- Location: Fourth and Beech Sts., Durant, Oklahoma
- Area: less than one acre
- Built: 1936
- Built by: Works Progress Administration
- NRHP reference No.: 88001375
- Added to NRHP: September 8, 1988

The Robert Lee Williams Public Library is located at 398 W Beech Street, Durant, Oklahoma, and was constructed in 1936 by a Works Progress Administration project. The building is an example of the art deco style in its limestone construction featuring decorative frieze above the window openings and pilasters between the windows and on both sides of the entry.

The library received a grant from the Gates Foundation to "expand public access to computers and the Internet."

It was added to the National Register of Historic Places in 1988.
