= Mead, Oklahoma =

Town in Oklahoma, US

- Town
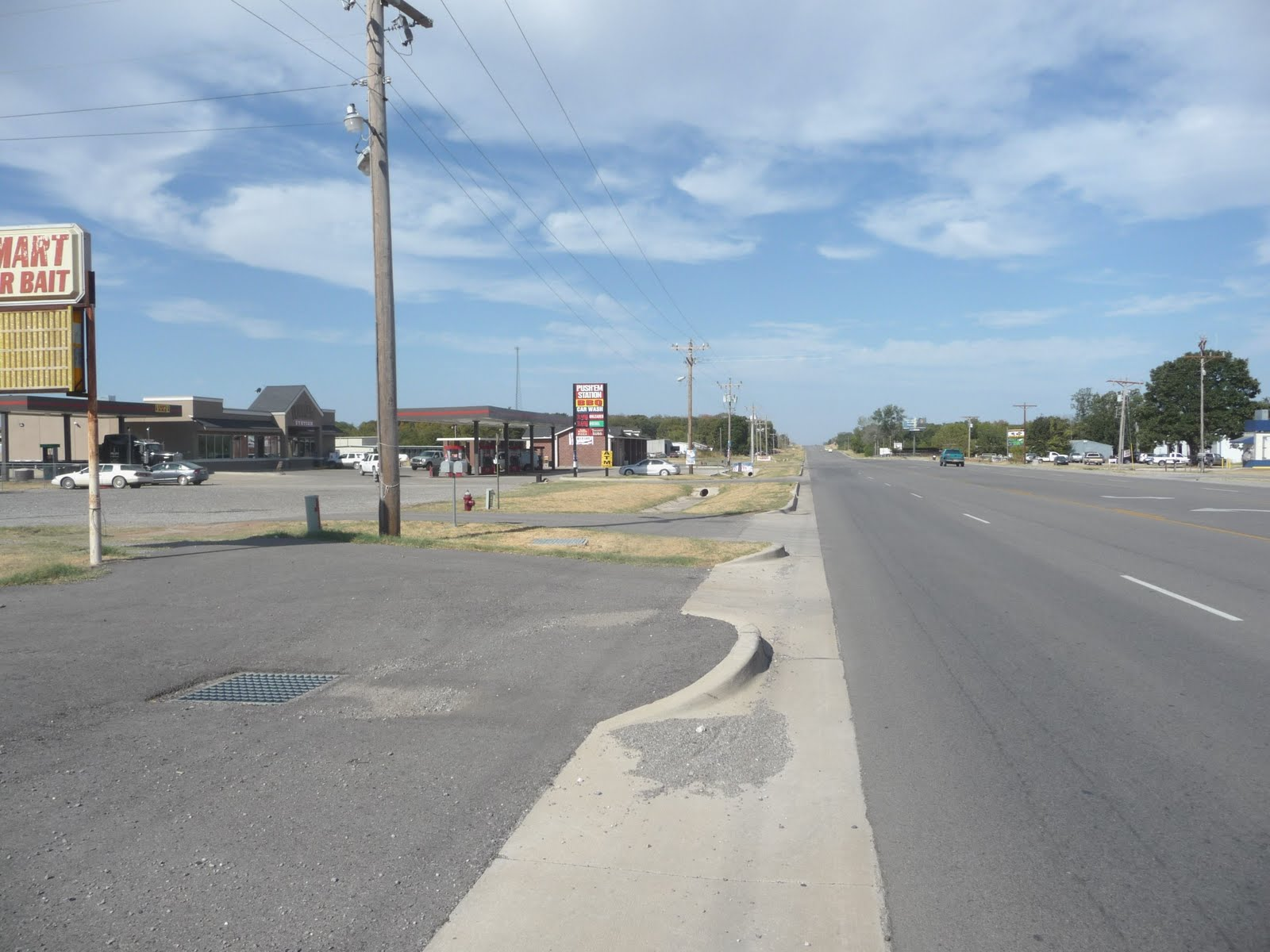

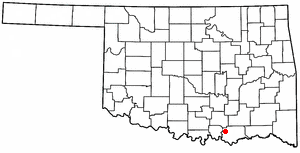
- Location of Mead, Oklahoma
- Coordinates: 34°00′06″N 96°30′40″W
- Country: United States
- State: Oklahoma
- County: Bryan

Area
  - Total: 0.32 sq mi (0.83 km^{2})
  - Land: 0.32 sq mi (0.83 km^{2})
  - Water: 0 sq mi (0.00 km^{2})
- Elevation: 742 ft (226 m)

Population (2020)
  - Total: 227
  - Density: 708.5/sq mi (273.56/km^{2})
- Time zone: UTC-6 (Central (CST))
  - Summer (DST): UTC-5 (CDT)
- ZIP code: 73449
- Area code: 580
- FIPS code: 40-47250
- GNIS feature ID: 2412971

Mead is a town in Bryan County, Oklahoma, United States. As of the 2020 census, Mead had a population of 227. Mead was originally named after C.W. Meade, the first postmaster, but the town later dropped the final "e" of the name.

== Geography ==
According to the United States Census Bureau, the town has a total area of 0.1 square miles (0.26 km^{2}), all land.

== Demographics ==
Historical population
Census	Pop.	Note	%±
1970	80		—
1980	143		78.8%
1990	109		−23.8%
2000	123		12.8%
2010	122		−0.8%
2020	227		86.1%
U.S. Decennial Census

=== 2020 census ===
As of the 2020 census, Mead had a population of 227 with a median age of 39.6 years. 24.2% of residents were under 18, and 19.8% were 65 or older. The gender ratio was 92.4 males per 100 females overall, and 93.3 males per 100 females among those 18 and over.

0.0% of residents lived in urban areas, while 100.0% lived in rural areas.

There were 79 households in Mead, of which 30.4% had children under the age of 18 living in them. Of all households, 36.7% were married-couple households, 25.3% were households with a male householder and no spouse or partner present, and 30.4% were households with a female householder and no spouse or partner present. About 20.2% of all households were made up of individuals and 5.1% had someone living alone who was 65 years of age or older.

There were 109 housing units, of which 27.5% were vacant. The homeowner vacancy rate was 0.0% and the rental vacancy rate was 24.1%.

Racial composition as of the 2020 census
Race	Number	Percent
White	160	70.5%
Black or African American	4	1.8%
American Indian and Alaska Native	48	21.1%
Asian	1	0.4%
Native Hawaiian and Other Pacific Islander	0	0.0%
Some other race	2	0.9%
Two or more races	12	5.3%
Hispanic or Latino (of any race)	19	8.4%

=== 2000 census ===
As of the 2000 census, there were 123 people, 49 households, and 29 families residing in the town. The population density was 1,142.5 inhabitants per square mile (441.1/km^{2}). There were 64 housing units at an average density of 594.5 per square mile (229.5/km^{2}). The racial makeup of the town was 79.67% White, 5.69% Native American, and 14.63% from two or more races. Hispanic or Latino of any race were 2.44% of the population.

There were 49 households, of which 38.8% had children under 18 living with them. 51.0% were married couples living together, 6.1% had a female householder with no husband present, and 38.8% were non-families. 34.7% of all households were made up of individuals, and 22.4% had someone living alone who was 65 or older. The average household size was 2.51 and the average family size was 3.40.

The population was spread out, with 35.8% under 18, 4.9% from 18 to 24, 30.1% from 25 to 44, 15.4% from 45 to 64, and 13.8% who were 65 or older. The median age was 30 years. The gender ratio was 89.2 males per 100 females overall, and 92.7 males per 100 females among those 18 and over.

The median income for a household in the town was $21,071, and the median income for a family was $23,125. Males had a median income of $29,167 versus $16,563 for females. The per capita income for the town was $9,697. 17.1% of families and 19.4% of the population were living below the poverty line, including 20.6% of those under 18 and 13.8% of those over 64.
