= Kenefic, Oklahoma =

Town in Oklahoma, US

- Town
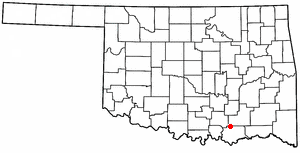
- Location of Kenefic, Oklahoma
- Coordinates: 34°09′00″N 96°21′52″W
- Country: United States
- State: Oklahoma
- County: Bryan

Area
  - Total: 1.00 sq mi (2.58 km^{2})
  - Land: 1.00 sq mi (2.58 km^{2})
  - Water: 0 sq mi (0.00 km^{2})
- Elevation: 663 ft (202 m)

Population (2020)
  - Total: 147
  - Density: 147.6/sq mi (56.98/km^{2})
- Time zone: UTC-6 (Central (CST))
  - Summer (DST): UTC-5 (CDT)
- ZIP code: 74748
- Area code: 580
- FIPS code: 40-39200
- GNIS feature ID: 2412825

Kenefic is a town in Bryan County, Oklahoma, United States. As of the 2020 census, Kenefic had a population of 147. The town was named for William Kenefick, president of the Missouri, Oklahoma and Gulf Railroad (MO&G), which had constructed a rail line through the region. The town name has been spelled both Kenefic and Kenefick throughout its history.

== History ==
At the time of its founding Kenefic was located in Blue County, Choctaw Nation.

== Geography ==
According to the United States Census Bureau, the town has a total area of 1.0 square mile (2.6 km^{2}), all land.

The town is served by both State Highway 48 and State Highway 22.

McGee Creek State Park and McGee Creek Lake are to the northeast; Lake Texoma is to the southwest.

== Climate ==
Climate data for Kenefic, Oklahoma
Month	Jan	Feb	Mar	Apr	May	Jun	Jul	Aug	Sep	Oct	Nov	Dec	Year
Mean daily maximum °F (°C)	50.1 (10.1)	55.4 (13.0)	64.4 (18.0)	73.7 (23.2)	80.6 (27.0)	88.3 (31.3)	93.9 (34.4)	93.6 (34.2)	85.5 (29.7)	76.0 (24.4)	63.7 (17.6)	53.9 (12.2)	73.3 (22.9)
Mean daily minimum °F (°C)	26.3 (−3.2)	31.6 (−0.2)	40.1 (4.5)	50.6 (10.3)	58.8 (14.9)	66.7 (19.3)	70.7 (21.5)	69.4 (20.8)	62.3 (16.8)	50.7 (10.4)	40.1 (4.5)	30.5 (−0.8)	49.8 (9.9)
Average precipitation inches (mm)	2.0 (51)	2.6 (66)	3.7 (94)	4.2 (110)	5.6 (140)	4.6 (120)	2.3 (58)	2.6 (66)	5.4 (140)	4.2 (110)	3.1 (79)	2.2 (56)	42.6 (1,080)
Source 1: weather.com
Source 2: Weatherbase

== Demographics ==
Historical population
Census	Pop.	Note	%±
1920	413		—
1930	284		−31.2%
1940	227		−20.1%
1950	115		−49.3%
1960	125		8.7%
1970	153		22.4%
1980	140		−8.5%
1990	147		5.0%
2000	192		30.6%
2010	196		2.1%
2020	147		−25.0%
U.S. Decennial Census

=== 2020 census ===
As of the 2020 census, Kenefic had a population of 147. The median age was 38.5 years. 22.4% of residents were under the age of 18 and 17.0% of residents were 65 years of age or older. For every 100 females there were 107.0 males, and for every 100 females age 18 and over there were 103.6 males age 18 and over.

0.0% of residents lived in urban areas, while 100.0% lived in rural areas.

There were 59 households in Kenefic, of which 54.2% had children under the age of 18 living in them. Of all households, 54.2% were married-couple households, 16.9% were households with a male householder and no spouse or partner present, and 23.7% were households with a female householder and no spouse or partner present. About 15.3% of all households were made up of individuals and 8.5% had someone living alone who was 65 years of age or older.

There were 65 housing units, of which 9.2% were vacant. The homeowner vacancy rate was 0.0% and the rental vacancy rate was 15.4%.

Racial composition as of the 2020 census
Race	Number	Percent
White	92	62.6%
Black or African American	1	0.7%
American Indian and Alaska Native	24	16.3%
Asian	0	0.0%
Native Hawaiian and Other Pacific Islander	0	0.0%
Some other race	12	8.2%
Two or more races	18	12.2%
Hispanic or Latino (of any race)	17	11.6%

=== 2000 census ===
As of the census of 2000, there were 192 people, 69 households, and 48 families residing in the town. The population density was 196.3 inhabitants per square mile (75.8/km^{2}). There were 77 housing units at an average density of 78.7 per square mile (30.4/km^{2}). The racial makeup of the town was 78.65% White, 18.75% Native American, 1.04% from other races, and 1.56% from two or more races. Hispanic or Latino of any race were 1.04% of the population.

There were 69 households, out of which 36.2% had children under the age of 18 living with them, 56.5% were married couples living together, 11.6% had a female householder with no husband present, and 29.0% were non-families. 23.2% of all households were made up of individuals, and 13.0% had someone living alone who was 65 years of age or older. The average household size was 2.78 and the average family size was 3.35.

In the town, the population was spread out, with 32.8% under the age of 18, 8.3% from 18 to 24, 31.3% from 25 to 44, 17.2% from 45 to 64, and 10.4% who were 65 years of age or older. The median age was 29 years. For every 100 females, there were 106.5 males. For every 100 females age 18 and over, there were 98.5 males.

The median income for a household in the town was $23,036, and the median income for a family was $24,464. Males had a median income of $22,500 versus $19,375 for females. The per capita income for the town was $10,763. About 21.8% of families and 23.9% of the population were below the poverty line, including 33.8% of those under the age of eighteen and 8.0% of those 65 or over.
