= Bryan County Courthouse (Oklahoma) =

- U.S. National Register of Historic Places
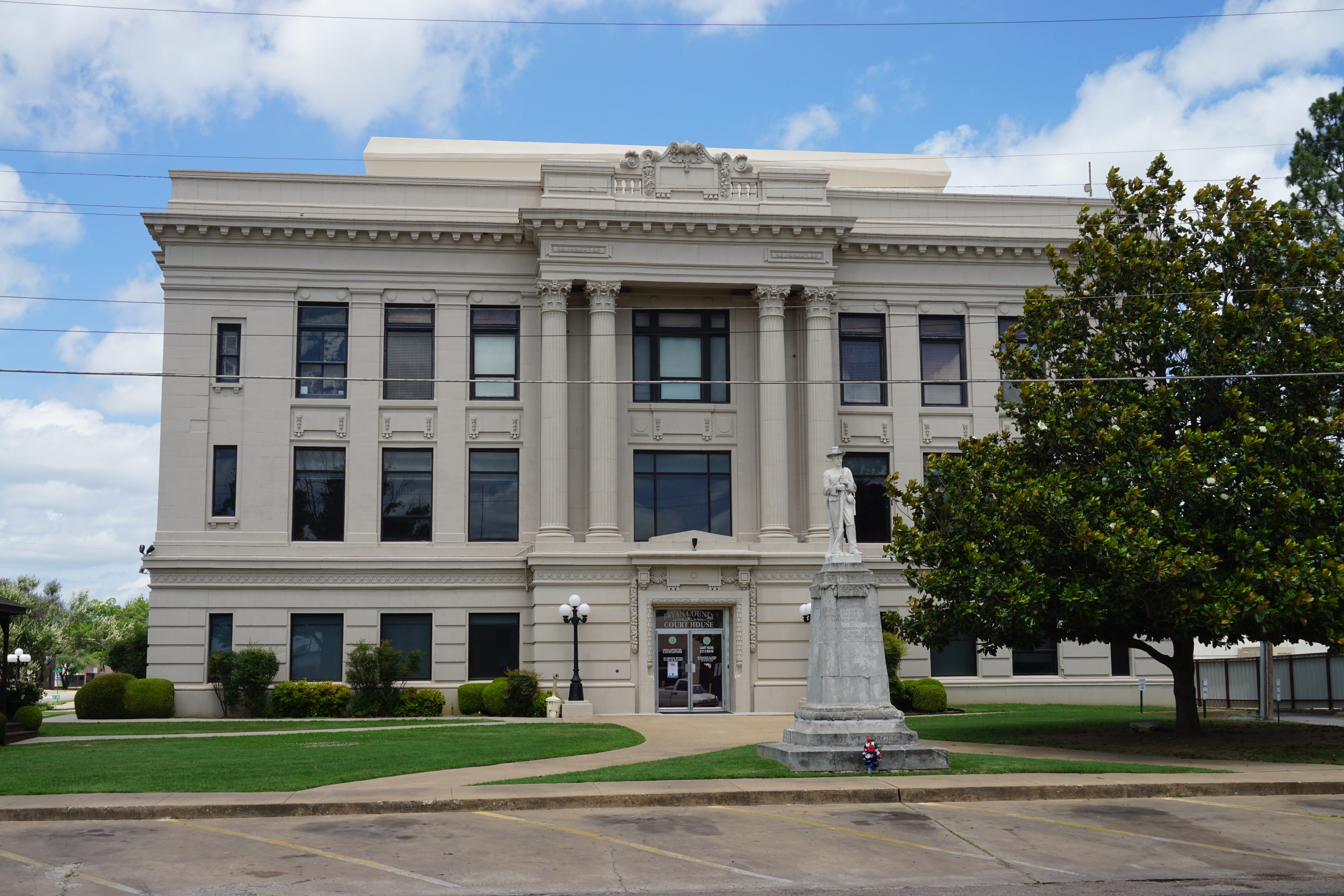

- Location within Oklahoma Location within the United States
- Interactive map showing the location of Bryan County Courthouse
- Location: 4th Ave. and Evergreen St., Durant, Oklahoma
- Coordinates: 33°59′34″N 96°22′52″W
- Area: less than one acre
- Built: 1917
- Architect: Jewell Hicks
- Architectural style: Classical Revival
- MPS: County Courthouses of Oklahoma TR
- NRHP reference No.: 84002974
- Added to NRHP: August 23, 1984

The Bryan County Courthouse in Durant, Oklahoma, located at 4th Avenue and Evergreen Street, was built in 1917. It was designed by architect Jewell Hicks. It was listed on the National Register of Historic Places in 1984.

It is a three-story courthouse. It was deemed "significant because of its importance to the county's residents as a center of government, and because it is an elegant example of monumental public architecture. It is particularly notable because its architect was Jewell Hicks, one of the designers of the Oklahoma State Capitol Building."

Before the courthouse stands a Confederate monument, erected in 1917 by the United Daughters of the Confederacy.
