= Tishomingo (disambiguation) =

Tishomingo was chief of the Chickasaw nation.

Tishomingo may also refer to:

== Places ==
=== United States ===
==== Mississippi ====
- Tishomingo, Mississippi
- Tishomingo County, Mississippi
- Tishomingo Creek, a stream in Mississippi from which a battle on June 10, 1864, took its name
- Tishomingo State Park

==== Oklahoma ====
- Tishomingo, Oklahoma
- Tishomingo National Wildlife Refuge

== Buildings ==
- Tishomingo City Hall
- Tishomingo Hotel

== Arts, entertainment and media ==
- Tishomingo Blues, a 1917 song by Spencer Williams
- Tishomingo Blues (novel), a 2002 novel by Elmore Leonard
- "Tishomingo", a song by Zach Bryan from American Heartbreak, 2022

== See also ==
- Tishomingo County School District, a public school district based in Iuka, Mississippi
