= National Register of Historic Places listings in Johnston County, Oklahoma =

Location of Johnston County in Oklahoma

This is a list of the National Register of Historic Places listings in Johnston County, Oklahoma.

This is intended to be a complete list of the properties on the National Register of Historic Places in Johnston County, Oklahoma, United States. The locations of National Register properties for which the latitude and longitude coordinates are included below, may be seen in a map.

There are 6 properties listed on the National Register in the county. Another property was once listed but has since been removed.

This National Park Service list is complete through NPS recent listings posted October 23, 2026.

== Current listings ==
	Name on the Register	Image	Date listed	Location	City or town	Description
1	Chickasaw National Capitols	Chickasaw National Capitols	November 5, 1971 (#71000663)	Capitol Ave. between 8th and 9th Sts. 34°14′17″N 96°40′47″W	Tishomingo	
2	Bessie Poe Hall		September 11, 1981 (#81000464)	Murray State College campus 34°13′28″N 96°40′41″W	Tishomingo	
3	Tishomingo Armory		May 20, 1994 (#94000489)	500 E. 24th St. 34°13′22″N 96°40′33″W	Tishomingo	
4	Tishomingo City Hall		May 21, 1975 (#75001565)	W. Main St. 34°14′13″N 96°40′53″W	Tishomingo	
5	Wapanucka Academy Site	Wapanucka Academy Site	June 13, 1972 (#72001065)	Address Restricted	Bromide	
6	White House of the Chickasaws		August 5, 1971 (#71000662)	6379 East Mansion Road; 34°12′09″N 96°32′31″W	Milburn	

== Former listing ==
	Name on the Register	Image	Date listed	Date removed	Location	City or town	Description
1	Governor William H. ("Alfalfa Bill") Murray House		August 2, 1984 (#84003066)	April 13, 2006	Off OK 78	Tishomingo	

== See also ==
- List of National Historic Landmarks in Oklahoma
- National Register of Historic Places listings in Oklahoma
