= Robert M. Harris =

Governor of the Chickasaw Nation
- In office 1896–1898
- Preceded by: Palmer Mosely
- Succeeded by: Douglas H. Johnston

Personal details
- Born: Robert Maxwell Harris; 1850 Tishomingo, Chickasaw Nation, Indian Territory, U.S.
- Died: 1927 (aged 76–77)

Robert Maxwell Harris was a Chickasaw politician who served as the governor of the Chickasaw Nation from 1896 to 1898.

== Biography ==
Robert Maxwell Harris was born in 1850 east of Tishomingo, Indian Territory. He was elected Governor of the Chickasaw Nation in 1896 and served until 1898. He expanded schools throughout the nation during his tenure and oversaw the building of the Chickasaw Capitol Building. He was a signed of the Atoka Agreement and served as the first president of the Chickasaw Bank in 1901. He died in 1927.
