= Te Ata (actress) =

Chickasaw actress and storyteller

- Born: Mary Frances Thompson; December 3, 1895; Emet, Chickasaw Nation, Indian Territory, U.S.
- Died: October 26, 1995 (aged 99); Oklahoma City, Oklahoma, U.S.
- Other names: Te Ata ("the dawn"); Te Ata Thompson; Te Ata Fisher; Mary Frances Thompson Fisher
- Citizenship: Chickasaw Nation, American
- Education: Oklahoma College for Women
- Occupations: Actress, Storyteller
- Spouse: Dr. George Clyde Fisher (1933–1949)
- Parent(s): T. B. Thompson; Bertie (Freund) Thompson
- Relatives: Douglas H. Johnston (uncle); Helen TeAta Cole (niece); Tom Cole (grand nephew)

Mary Frances Thompson Fisher (December 3, 1895 – October 26, 1995), best known as Te Ata, was an American actress and storyteller who was a citizen of the Chickasaw Nation, she was known for telling Native American stories. She performed as a representative of Native Americans at state dinners before President Franklin D. Roosevelt in the 1930s. She was inducted into the Oklahoma Hall of Fame in 1957 and was named Oklahoma's first State Treasure in 1987.

== Name etymology ==
Her stage name, Te Ata, means "the dawn", or "bearer of the morning". Some Chickasaw speakers say that her name originates from "itti' hata'", an old word meaning sycamore, birch, or cottonwood, and that, in order to further accentuate her name, she changed it to "Te Ata".

== Early life ==
Te Ata was born Mary Frances Thompson in Emet, Chickasaw Nation (now in Johnston County, Oklahoma), to parents Thomas Benjamin Thompson, a Chickasaw, and Bertie (Freund) Thompson a German American. (Note: Her uncle, Douglas H. Johnston, was the last governor of Chickasaw Nation.) The name "Te Ata" is the Māori (New Zealand Indigenous) word for "the dawn". It was given to her by an unknown person. "Te Ata" is not a Chickasaw word nor phrase. Te Ata began her early education in a one-room tribal school; after two years she was sent to Bloomfield Academy, a Chickasaw boarding school for girls. (Note: Te Ata's uncle, Douglas H. Johnston, had been superintendent of Bloomfield Academy from 1880 to 1895, the year she was born.) At Bloomfield, she met Muriel Wright, a teacher who became her role model. Te Ata graduated high school from Tishomingo, Oklahoma, where she was salutatorian. She is listed a 1/8th Chickasaw by Blood on the Dawes Rolls.

In the fall of 1915, Te Ata began college at the Oklahoma College for Women (now the University of Science and Arts of Oklahoma) in Chickasha, and graduated in 1919. During her time at Oklahoma College for Women, she worked as an assistant in the theater department for theater instructor Frances Dinsmore Davis. It was during this time that Te Ata was first introduced to the stage.

== Performance career ==
Davis encouraged Te Ata to use Native American stories as the basis for her senior performance at Oklahoma College for Women. Te Ata made her debut as an artist during her senior year of college performing songs and stories from several different tribes. The debut was well-received, and she was asked to perform at the University of Oklahoma and various other institutions.

Upon graduation, Te Ata was offered a part in a traveling Chautauqua circuit by Thurlow Lieurance, who had been in the audience at her senior performance. The tour gave Te Ata an opportunity to travel across the United States and fostered her talents as a performer. She undertook further training in theatre at the Carnegie Institute in Pittsburgh, Pennsylvania. She then moved to New York City, where she performed in several Broadway productions; her most notable role was Andromache in The Trojan Women. She eventually decided to concentrate on her one-woman performances of Native American songs and stories. In 1928, while living in New York City, she shared an apartment with Chickasaw educator and performer Mary Stone McLendon. She referred to McLendon as her "cousin", however it is unknown whether they were actually related or whether they knew each other prior to living in New York City.

Eleanor Roosevelt, whose husband, Franklin D. Roosevelt, was then governor of New York, invited Te Ata to perform at the governor's mansion. After Franklin was elected president, Te Ata performed at the White House for his first state dinner. In 1939, Te Ata performed at Hyde Park for the Roosevelts and the visiting King George VI and Queen Elizabeth, who were visiting the United States. The King and Queen then invited Te Ata to perform in England.

In addition to traveling across the United States, Te Ata visited Denmark, Sweden, Estonia, Finland, England, Peru, Guatemala, Canada, and Mexico.

Te Ata's career spanned more than 60 years, and she collected hundreds of stories from different tribes. During her performances she told numerous stories, such as "There Are Birds of Many Colors" by Hiamove, "The Creation of Mankind" told to her by her father, "How Death Came into the World", "Pasikola (Rabbit) was Disconnected", "Anybody Want a Wife?", "The Corn Ceremony", "The Blue Duck", and "Baby Rattlesnake".

== Personal life ==
On September 28, 1933, Te Ata married Dr. George Clyde Fisher in Muskogee, Oklahoma, at the Bacone College Ataloa Lodge, established by Chickasaw vocalist, educator, and friend Ataloa. Te Ata had many notable friends including First Lady Eleanor Roosevelt, Jim Thorpe (Sac & Fox), and Woody Crumbo (Citizen Potawatomi). Through Dr. Fisher, she was introduced to Albert Einstein, Henry Ford, John Burroughs, Thomas Edison, E.W. Deming, Clark Wissler and Chief Buffalo Child Long Lance. She was also the niece of Douglas H. Johnston, the last governor of the old Chickasaw Nation.

Te Ata died in Oklahoma City on October 26, 1995. Her legacy was continued through her family, which included former Oklahoma state legislator Helen TeAta Cole (since deceased in 2004) and Helen's son, U.S. Congressman from Oklahoma, Tom Cole.

== Legacy and honors ==
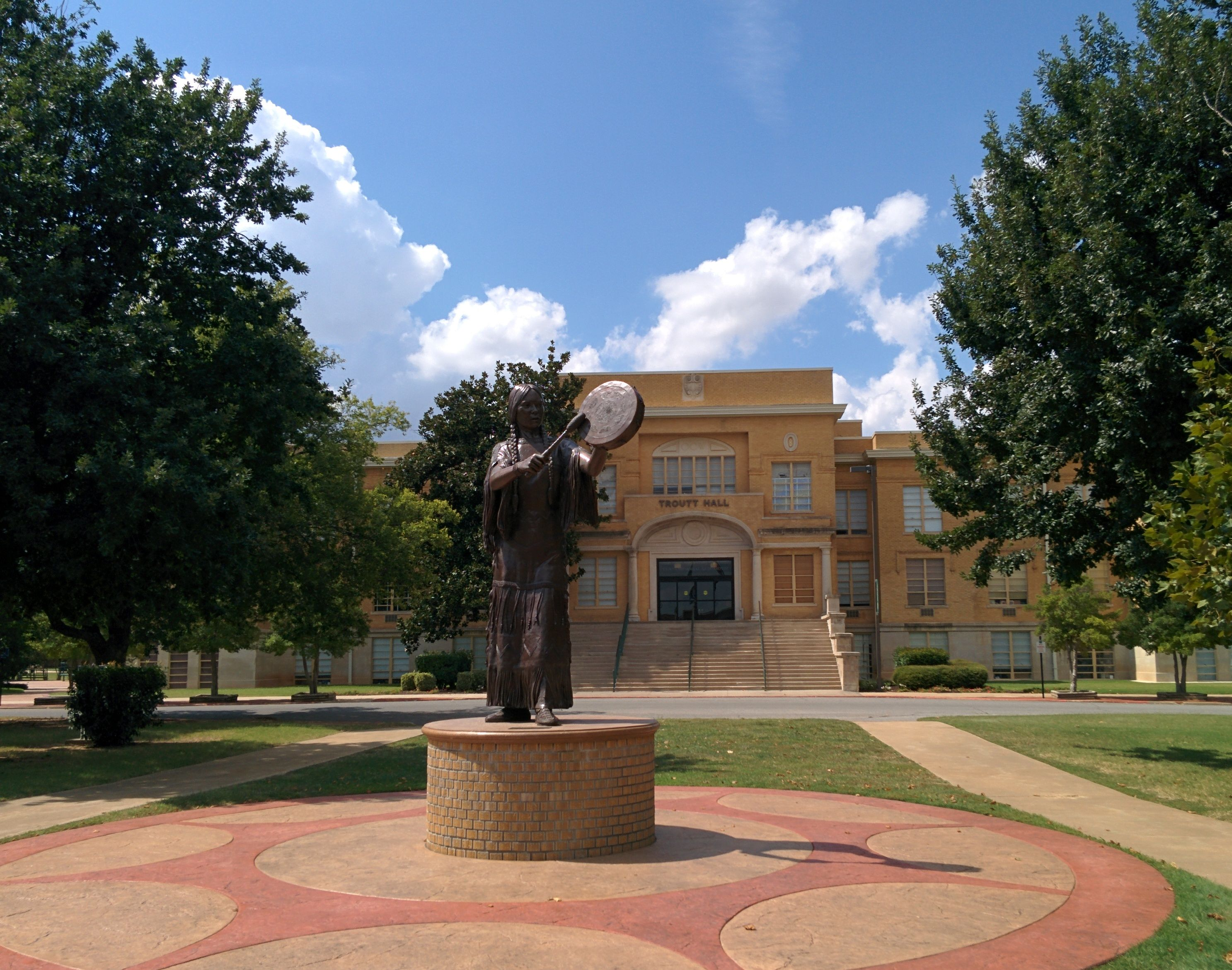
Statue of Te Ata on the USAO campus.

Te Ata’s life and likeness have been featured in many books, plays and magazines. In the summer of 1924, Te Ata was featured in McCall's magazine in its "Types of American Beauty" series.

Her life and performances have been commemorated through several different awards. She was the namesake for Lake Te Ata in New York. She was named the Ladies' Home Journal Woman of the Year in 1976. She was inducted into the Oklahoma Hall of Fame in 1957 and named Oklahoma’s Official State Treasure in 1987. In 1990, she was inducted into the Chickasaw Hall of Fame.

Chickasaw playwright JudyLee Oliva wrote a play based on her life, entitled Te Ata, which won the Five Civilized Tribes' Best American Indian Musical Award in 2000. It premiered at the University of Science and Arts of Oklahoma in 2006 and was performed at the Smithsonian Institution's National Museum of the American Indian in 2012. In 2012, Te Ata was portrayed by actress Kumiko Konishi in the film Hyde Park on Hudson, which centered on the 1939 meeting of Franklin D. Roosevelt and King George VI and Queen Elizabeth of England; in the film, Te Ata performs for the king and queen as she did in 1939.

In 2014, the Chickasaw Nation began production on a film Te Ata based on Te Ata's life. The film stars Q'orianka Kilcher and was released in October 2017.

The Oklahoma Historical Society notes that her performances are preserved in a film, "God's Drum" (circa 1971), and on a video recording of a storytelling festival sponsored by the Oklahoma City Arts Council, declaring "Te Ata Fisher's influence on the appreciation of Native traditions and on the art of storytelling is an enduring legacy."

Her alma mater, University of Science and Arts of Oklahoma (formerly the Oklahoma College for Women), has presented her with multiple honors. In 1972, she became the first inductee into the University of Science and Arts of Oklahoma Hall of Fame. In 2006, USAO renamed its auditorium in Trout Hall the "Te Ata Memorial Auditorium". In 2014, a statue in her likeness was installed in the center of the campus.

== Sources ==
- Armstrong, Ann Elizabeth. Performing Worlds Into Being: Native American Women's Theater.
- Carlile, Glenda (1995). Petticoats, Politics, and Pirouettes: Oklahoma Women from 1900-1950. Oklahoma City: Southern Hills Publishing Company. ISBN 0962821446.
- Eppinga, Jane. They Made Their Mark: An Illustrated History of the Society of Woman Geographers.
- Fitzgerald, David; Barbour, Jeannie; Cobb, Amanda; Hogan, Linda (2006). Chickasaw: Unconquered and Unconquerable. Ada, Oklahoma: Chickasaw Press. ISBN 978-1-55868-992-3.
- Gallagher, Brian. Anything Goes: The Jazz Age Adventures of Neysa McMein and Her Extravagant Circle of Friends. New York: Reed Business Information, Inc.
- Green, Richard G. (1995). "Crossing Paths: Te Ata and Eleanor Roosevelt in the Twenties and Thirties". Journal of Chickasaw History. 1 (4). Ada, Oklahoma: Chickasaw Historical Society: 13–30. ISSN 1538-0750.
- Green, Richard (2002). Te Ata Chickasaw Storyteller, American Treasure. Norman, OK: University of Oklahoma press.
- Morgan, Phillip Carroll; Parker, Judy Goforth. Dynamic Chickasaw Women.
- Smith, Donald B. Chief Buffalo Child Long Lance: The Glorious Imposter.
- Southwell, Kristina L. A Guide to Photographs in the Western History Collections of the University of Oklahoma.
- Vollan, Charles (2007). "Fisher, Te Ata (1895-1995)". In Wishart, David J. (ed.). Encyclopedia of the Great Plains Indians. Bison Books. p. 69.
- Ware, Susan (2005). Notable American Women: a Biographical Dictionary, Volume 5: Completing the Twentieth Century. Cambridge, MA: Harvard University Press.
