= Chickasaw Capitol Building =

- Chickasaw National Capitol Building
- U.S. National Register of Historic Places
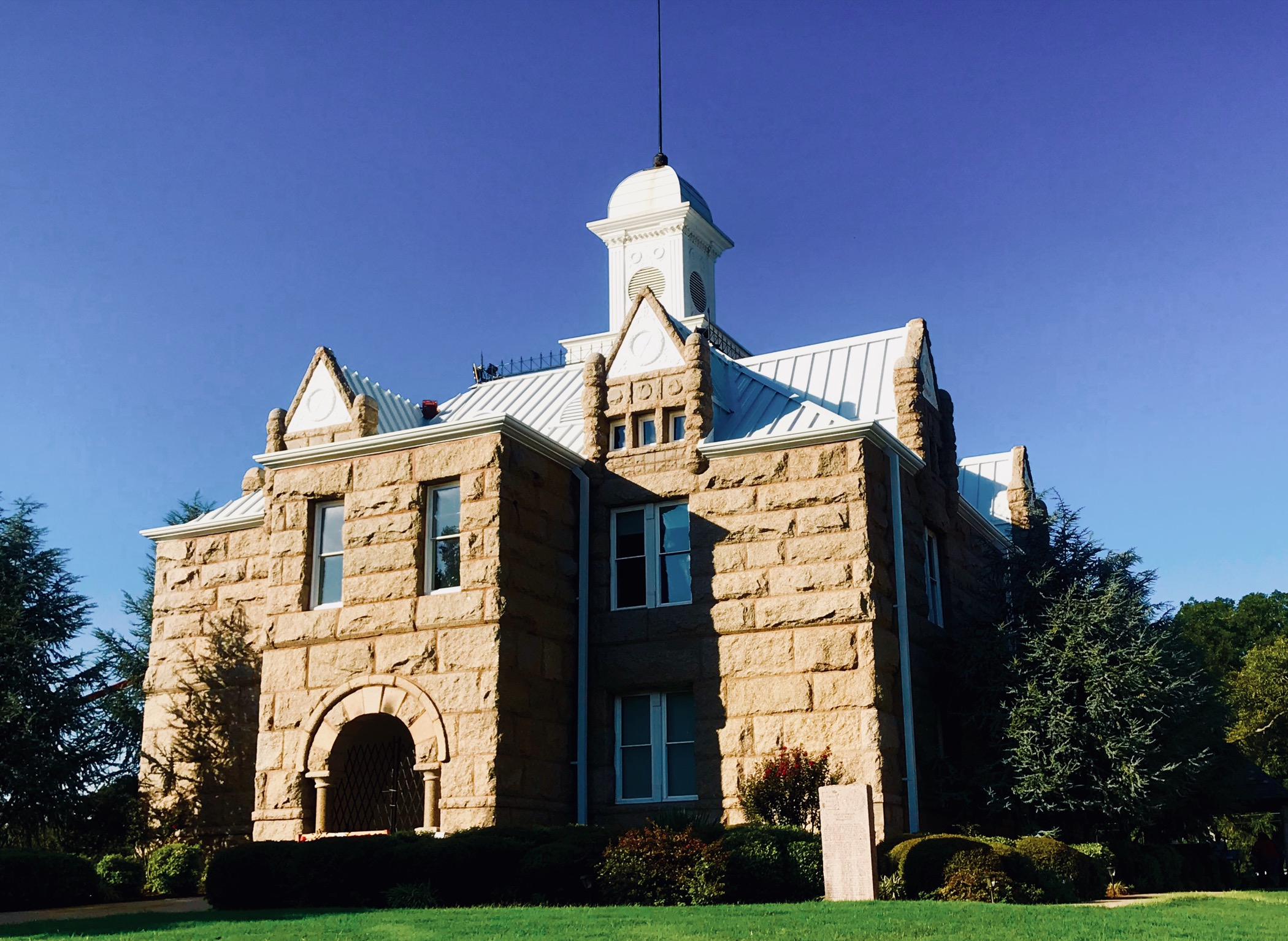
- Location: Tishomingo, Johnston County, Oklahoma
- Built: 1898
- Architectural style: Victorian Gothic
- NRHP reference No.: 71000663
- Added to NRHP: November 5, 1971

The Chickasaw Capitol Building housed the government of the Chickasaw Nation during its last six years of existence. The government ceased to exist on March 4, 1906, a little more than one year before Indian Territory and Oklahoma Territory combined to form the present state of Oklahoma. The building was sold to Johnston County, Oklahoma, in 1992, which used it as the county courthouse. The Chickasaw Nation repurchased the structure and has turned it into a museum.

== Creation of the National Capitol ==
After the Chickasaw were forced to emigrate to the Indian Territory, they built their main town, Tishomingo. There they constructed a one-room log council house to serve as their capitol. (Note: Green indicates that the original council house was refurbished in 1966, and became the main attraction at the Council House Museum in Tishomingo.) In 1856, the Chickasaw built a two-story brick building that served as their capitol until 1898. The ravages of the Civil War and the aftermath of financial hard times left the 1856 building in a sorry state. The Chickasaw leaders ordered the old building to be dismantled and construction of a new capitol at that site.

However, by 1898, the negotiations were well underway between the Chickasaw, Choctaw and U.S. Government that would result in the Atoka Agreement. A key provision stated that the tribal governments were to be terminated on March 4, 1906.The tribal chiefs ratified the document in November 7, 1896, though it had to be approved by Chickasaw voters and an election was held in August 1898.

Despite the knowledge that the capitol would soon become useless because the Nation would become defunct, its leaders pursued construction of an imposing building as a memorial to the existence of the Chickasaw people. Robert M. Harris, who was elected Governor in 1896, is credited with being the driving force behind the construction. The Victorian gothic structure is built of red granite from Pennington Creek. The rock came from a quarry owned by Harris, and was cut and hauled into town on mule-drawn wagons.

The building encloses 8,000 square feet (740 m^{2}) of space and sits amid spacious, well-kept grounds in Tishomingo, Oklahoma.

== After Statehood ==
The building continued to serve until November 7, 1908, when Oklahoma officially became a state and the Chickasaw Nation was officially notified to vacate the premises. It remained vacant until 1910, when the Chickasaw Nation sold it to Johnston County, Oklahoma for use as a courthouse. It was added to the National Register of Historic Places in 1910. The Chickasaw Nation bought it back from Johnston County to turn it into a museum.

== Museum ==
The museum is open Monday through Friday, 8 AM to 5 PM, and Saturday, 10 AM through 4 PM. Tours are offered Tuesday through Friday from 10 AM through 4:30 PM. The largest exhibit presents Chickasaw government history from 1856 through 1907. Other featured exhibits include a replica of Governor Douglas Johnston's office, the National Secretary's vault, a Chickasaw Governors portrait collection, a rotating photography exhibit, and the Chickasaw National Well, just outside the building.

== See also ==
- Atoka Agreement
- Chickasaw Nation Capitols
