= Bear Creek Fishweir No. 1 =

- Bear Creek Fishweir #1
- U.S. National Register of Historic Places
- Location within Mississippi Location within the United States
- Nearest city: Tishomingo, Mississippi
- Coordinates: 34°35′45″N 88°10′57″W
- Area: less than one acre
- Built by: William Wiley Leatherwood
- Architectural style: Fishweir
- NRHP reference No.: 00001057
- Added to NRHP: August 11, 2005

The Bear Creek Fishweir #1 is a historic fishing weir on Bear Creek in Tishomingo State Park, in northeastern Mississippi. It consists of a fieldstone dam extending from the south bank of the creek at an angle for about 40 metres (130 ft), with evidence that a similar but shorter dam extended for some 8 metres (26 ft) from the north bank. The two dams formed a V shape with a narrow chute between them. At that point there is evidence of a 20th-century fish trap constructed of wooden elements, of which only fragments remained. Its known history is that it was built (or more likely, rebuilt) by William Wiley Leatherwood, whose family maintained the weir. State law requiring weirs to not impede waterflow was passed in the 1920s, leading to its decreased effectiveness and eventual abandonment. The weir is one of the best-preserved such structures in northeastern Mississippi, many of the others having been destroyed to improve water flow.

The weir wa listed on the National Register of Historic Places in 2005.

== See also ==
- Bear Creek Fishweir No. 2
- National Register of Historic Places listings in Tishomingo County, Mississippi
