= Bear Creek Fishweir No. 2 =

- Bear Creek Fishweir #2
- U.S. National Register of Historic Places
- Location within Mississippi Location within the United States
- Nearest city: Tishomingo, Mississippi
- Coordinates: 34°36′33″N 88°11′27″W
- Area: less than one acre
- Architectural style: Fishweir
- NRHP reference No.: 00001058
- Added to NRHP: April 10, 2007

The Bear Creek Fishweir #2 is a historic fishing weir on Bear Creek in Tishomingo State Park, northeastern Mississippi. The weir is a roughly V-shaped stone construction built from readily available local sandstone. The walls of the weir meet closer to the western bank of the creek, where they form a chute estimated to be 11 metres (36 ft) in length. At the end of the chute, there would have been a fish trap of wooden construction, of which no traces remain. Residents almost certainly maintained the weir into the early 20th century, but it may have been built on the site of an earlier construction by Native Americans. This weir, along with Bear Creek Fishweir No. 1, is one of the best-preserved surviving weirs in northeastern Mississippi.

The weir was listed on the National Register of Historic Places in 2007.

== See also ==
- Bear Creek Fishweir No. 1
- National Register of Historic Places listings in Tishomingo County, Mississippi
