= Palmer Mosely =

Governor of the Chickasaw Nation
- In office 1902–1904
- Preceded by: Douglas H. Johnston
- Succeeded by: Douglas H. Johnston
- In office 1894–1896
- Preceded by: Jonas Wolf
- Succeeded by: Robert M. Harris

Personal details
- Born: 1851
- Died: 1908 (aged 56 or 57) Bromide, Oklahoma

Palmer Mosely was a Chickasaw politician who served two non-consecutive terms as the governor of the Chickasaw Nation from 1894 to 1896 and 1902 to 1904.

== Biography ==
Palmer Mosely was born in 1851. He entered Chickasaw Nation politics in 1875 as the interpreter for the nation's legislature. In 1877, he was elected to the Chickasaw House of Representatives. In 1882, he served as a county judge and in 1884 he started working for Governor Jonas Wolf. He served as the nation's Superintendent of Schools between 1885 and 1889. In 1897, he signed the Atoka Agreement which began the process of allotting the Chickasaw Nation's Reservation. He was elected as the governor of the Chickasaw Nation from 1894 to 1896 and 1902 to 1904. He died in 1908 in Bromide, Oklahoma.
