= National Register of Historic Places listings in Tishomingo County, Mississippi =

Location of Tishomingo County in Mississippi

This is a list of the National Register of Historic Places listings in Tishomingo County, Mississippi.

This is intended to be a complete list of the properties and districts on the National Register of Historic Places in Tishomingo County, Mississippi, United States. Latitude and longitude coordinates are provided for many National Register properties and districts; these locations may be seen together in a map.

There are 17 properties and districts listed on the National Register in the county. Another property was once listed but has been removed.

This National Park Service list is complete through NPS recent listings posted May 23, 2025.

== Current listings ==
	Name on the Register	Image	Date listed	Location	City or town	Description
1	Bear Creek Fishweir No. 1		August 11, 2005 (#00001057)	Tishomingo State Park; 34°35′45″N 88°10′57″W	Tishomingo vicinity	
2	Bear Creek Fishweir No. 2		April 10, 2007 (#00001058)	Tishomingo State Park; 34°36′33″N 88°11′27″W	Tishomingo vicinity	
3	Bear Creek Mound and Village Site (22Ts500)	Bear Creek Mound and Village Site (22Ts500)	December 22, 1988 (#88002825)	Mile 308.8 on the Natchez Trace Parkway; 34°38′34″N 88°08′25″W	Tishomingo vicinity	
4	R.C. Brinkley House	R.C. Brinkley House	April 26, 2002 (#02000407)	605 E. Eastport St. 34°48′39″N 88°11′02″W	Iuka	
5	Central Iuka Historic District	Central Iuka Historic District	November 1, 1991 (#91001577)	Roughly Fulton and Main Sts. from Eastport St. to the Southern railroad tracks and Front St. from Pearl to Fulton Sts. 34°48′40″N 88°11′25″W	Iuka	
6	Church of Our Savior	Church of Our Savior	August 9, 1991 (#91000929)	E. Eastport St. between Main and Fulton Sts. 34°48′43″N 88°11′23″W	Iuka	
7	J.M. Coman House	J.M. Coman House	August 9, 1991 (#91000930)	202 E. Quitman St. 34°48′31″N 88°11′24″W	Iuka	
8	James S. Davis House	James S. Davis House	August 9, 1991 (#91000931)	102 E. Meigg St. 34°48′29″N 88°11′28″W	Iuka	
9	James H. Doan House	James H. Doan House	August 9, 1991 (#91000932)	203 W. Quitman St. 34°48′33″N 88°11′34″W	Iuka	
10	G.P. Hammerly House	G.P. Hammerly House	August 9, 1991 (#91000934)	102 E. Quitman St. 34°48′32″N 88°11′28″W	Iuka	
11	Iuka Battlefield	Iuka Battlefield	November 14, 2007 (#07001184)	North of U.S. Route 72 and west of Mississippi Highway 25; 34°47′52″N 88°12′29″W	Iuka	Site of the Civil War Battle of Iuka
12	J.C. Jourdan House	J.C. Jourdan House	August 9, 1991 (#91000935)	305 W. Eastport St. 34°48′44″N 88°11′33″W	Iuka	
13	Merrill-Newhardt House	Merrill-Newhardt House	August 9, 1991 (#91000936)	508 W. Quitman St. 34°48′37″N 88°11′42″W	Iuka	
14	Old Tishomingo County Courthouse	Old Tishomingo County Courthouse	April 11, 1973 (#73001026)	Northeastern corner of Quitman and Liberty Sts. 34°48′33″N 88°11′23″W	Iuka	
15	Reid House	Reid House	August 9, 1991 (#91000937)	702 W. Eastport St. 34°48′47″N 88°11′44″W	Iuka	
16	Stone-Reid House	Stone-Reid House	August 9, 1991 (#91000938)	503 W. Eastport St. 34°48′45″N 88°11′40″W	Iuka	
17	Tishomingo State Park	Tishomingo State Park	March 26, 1998 (#98000275)	Southeast of the junction of State Highways 25 and 30; 34°36′11″N 88°10′56″W	Tishomingo vicinity	

== Former listing ==
	Name on the Register	Image	Date listed	Date removed	Location	City or town	Description
1	R. D. Edwards House		August 9, 1991 (#91000933)	August 7, 2002	603 Indian Creek Road	Iuka	Destroyed by fire December 30, 2001

== See also ==
- List of National Historic Landmarks in Mississippi
- National Register of Historic Places listings in Mississippi
