= Helen Cole =

American politician (1922–2004)

Member of the Oklahoma Senate from the 45th district
- In office July 1991 – November 1996
- Preceded by: Tom Cole
- Succeeded by: Kathleen Wilcoxson
- In office November 1984 – November 1988
- Succeeded by: Tom Cole

Member of the Oklahoma House of Representatives from the 54th district
- In office 1979–1984

Personal details
- Born: Helen TeAta Gale; July 13, 1922 Tishomingo, Oklahoma, U.S.
- Died: April 7, 2004 (aged 81) Moore, Oklahoma, U.S.
- Party: Republican
- Spouse: John Dwayne Cole Sr (m. 1946)
- Relations: Te Ata Fisher (Aunt)
- Children: John Cole Jr. and Tom Cole

Helen TeAta Gale Cole (July 13, 1922 – April 7, 2004) was an American politician who served in the Oklahoma House of Representatives from 1979 to 1984. She first served in the Oklahoma Senate from 1984 to 1988. She returned to the state senate in 1991 and was succeeded by Kathleen Wilcoxson in 1997.

Her son, Tom Cole, is the longest-serving Native American in the history of the United States Congress.

== Early life and education ==
Helen TeAta Gale was born in Tishomingo, Oklahoma, on July 13, 1922, to William Oakley Gale and Avis Minnette Fifield (Thompson). She was raised in a single-parent household and graduated from Ardmore High School in 1939.

== Career ==
Cole was active in several local civic and political organizations, and contributed to the successful gubernatorial campaigns of Henry Bellmon and Dewey Bartlett. Cole was named a delegate to the 1968 Republican National Convention, and Bartlett appointed her to the Oklahoma Personnel Board. Cole ran for a seat on the Oklahoma House of Representatives and was first elected in 1978. From 1979 to 1984, she represented district 54.

Cole contested the 45th district Oklahoma Senate seat in 1984, and won one term. Cole retired. She returned to her political career when elected as mayor of Moore, Oklahoma, in 1990.

The next year, she succeeded her son Tom Cole as state senator from the 45th district. Cole was named a National Convention delegate for a second time for the 1992 Republican National Convention. Cole stepped down from the state senate in 1997, and was succeeded by Kathleen Wilcoxson. Cole was appointed a National Convention delegate for a third time for the 2000 Republican National Convention. In retirement, she became a benefactor of the University of Science and Arts of Oklahoma.

== Personal life ==
Cole was of Chickasaw and Choctaw descent. She was a member of the Chickasaw Nation. She died on April 7, 2004, at the age of 81.

== See also ==
- List of Native American politicians
- Native American women in politics
