= Emet, Oklahoma =

- Unincorporated community and Census designated place
- Location within Oklahoma Location within the United States
- Coordinates: 34°12′22″N 96°32′32″W
- Country: United States
- State: Oklahoma
- County: Johnston

Area
  - Total: 0.44 sq mi (1.13 km^{2})
  - Land: 0.44 sq mi (1.13 km^{2})
  - Water: 0 sq mi (0.00 km^{2})
- Elevation: 810 ft (250 m)

Population (2020)
  - Total: 69
  - Density: 158.7/sq mi (61.26/km^{2})
- Time zone: UTC-6 (Central (CST))
  - Summer (DST): UTC-5 (CDT)
- FIPS code: 40-23850
- GNIS feature ID: 2812851

Emet is an unincorporated community and census-designated place in Johnston County, Oklahoma, United States. The population was 69 as of the 2020 Census. A post office operated in Emet from 1884 to 1917. The Chickasaw have dwelt in Johnston County since the 1830s, and Emet's history reflects its Chickasaw heritage. Pleasant Grove Mission School, which was established by the Methodist Episcopal Church in 1844 and served the Chickasaw Nation, was located near Emet. Chickasaw actress and storyteller Te Ata Fisher was born in Emet in 1895.

Douglas H. Johnston, the last governor of the Chickasaw Nation, lived in Emet. His home, known as the White House of the Chickasaws and now a museum, still stands on the north edge of the community though its formal street address is now in Milburn, Oklahoma.

== Demographics ==
Historical population
Census	Pop.	Note	%±
2020	69		—
U.S. Decennial Census

=== 2020 census ===
==== Racial and ethnic composition ====
Racial composition as of the 2020 census
Race	Number	Percent
White	44	63.8%
Black or African American	4	5.8%
American Indian and Alaska Native	6	8.7%
Asian	0	0.0%
Native Hawaiian and Other Pacific Islander	0	0.0%
Some other race	0	0.0%
Two or more races	15	21.7%
Hispanic or Latino (of any race)	9	13.0%

As of the 2020 census, Emet had a population of 69. The median age was 36.5 years. 24.6% of residents were under the age of 18 and 15.9% of residents were 65 years of age or older. For every 100 females there were 72.5 males, and for every 100 females age 18 and over there were 62.5 males age 18 and over.

0.0% of residents lived in urban areas, while 100.0% lived in rural areas.

There were 24 households in Emet, of which 25.0% had children under the age of 18 living in them. Of all households, 41.7% were married-couple households, 33.3% were households with a male householder and no spouse or partner present, and 16.7% were households with a female householder and no spouse or partner present. About 25.0% of all households were made up of individuals and 16.7% had someone living alone who was 65 years of age or older.

There were 31 housing units, of which 22.6% were vacant. The homeowner vacancy rate was 10.5% and the rental vacancy rate was 0.0%.
