= Jonas Wolf =

Governor of the Chickasaw Nation
- In office 1892–1894
- Preceded by: William Byrd
- Succeeded by: Palmer Mosely
- In office 1884–1886
- Preceded by: Benjamin Franklin Overton
- Succeeded by: William Guy

Personal details
- Born: Jonas Wolf; June 30, 1828 De Soto County, Mississippi, U.S.
- Died: January 14, 1900 (aged 71)
- Citizenship: Chickasaw Nation

Jonas Wolf was a Chickasaw politician who served as the governor of the Chickasaw Nation from 1892 to 1894 and from 1884 to 1886.

== Biography ==
Jonas Wolf was born on June 30, 1828, near De Soto County, Mississippi. His father was Jonas Wolf, a notable Chickasaw. His family relocated to Doaksville, Indian Territory, after Indian removal. He worked as a farmer until the American Civil War when he became a Presbyterian minister. He was elected Governor of the Chickasaw Nation from 1884 to 1886 and from 1892 to 1894. During his tenure, he opposed the allotment of the nation's lands. Wolf spoke the Chickasaw language, and he never learned English. He died on January 14, 1900.
