= Tishomingo Creek =

Stream in Mississippi, United States

Coordinates: 34.4159359°N 88.7583891°W

Tishomingo Creek is a stream in the U.S. state of Mississippi. It is named after Tishomingo, a Chickasaw chieftain.
