= George Clyde Fisher =

American museum curator (1878–1949)

Clyde Fisher
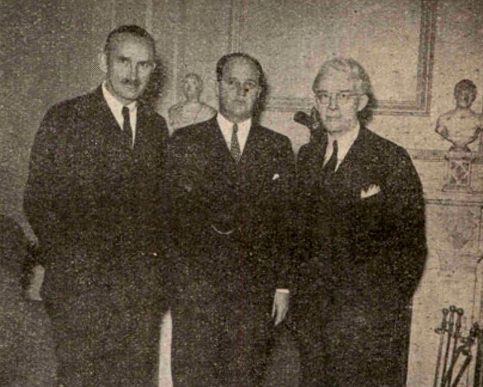
- Major Albert W. Stevens, Mr. F. Trubee Davison and Dr. Clyde Fisher (c. 1937)
- Born: George Clyde Fisher; May 22, 1878; Sidney, Ohio, U.S.
- Died: January 7, 1949 (aged 70)
- Education: Miami University, Johns Hopkins University
- Occupations: Academic, botanist, astronomer, curator
- Spouses: Bessie Wiley, Te Ata Fisher
- Parent(s): Harrison Jay & Amanda (Rhinehart) Fisher

George Clyde Fisher (May 22, 1878 – January 7, 1949), known as Clyde Fisher, was a curator at the American Museum of Natural History and later the head of the Hayden Planetarium.

== Early life ==
George Clyde Fisher was born on May 22, 1878, near Sidney, Ohio, the son of Harrison Fisher, a farmer. He attended public schools and later enrolled at Ohio Normal University.

He graduated from Miami University with a Bachelor of Arts degree in 1905, and for two years just after graduation he was a science teacher at Troy High School (Troy, Ohio).

He was the principal of Palmer College Academy in 1907–1909 and acting president in 1909–10, after which he went back to school and earned a Ph.D. degree in botany from Johns Hopkins University. He taught summer courses in ornithology at Cornell University, the University of Florida and the University of Tennessee.

== Career ==
In 1913 Fisher became the curator of visual instruction work with schools and colleges for the American Museum of Natural History. He was named curator of astronomy in 1924, and in 1935 he became head of the Hayden Planetarium. He held these titles until he became the Honorary Curator of Astronomy at the museum and planetarium. Leading up to the creation of the Hayden Planetarium, Fisher visited European planetariums, including the Zeiss projection planetariums in Germany. The planetarium was eventually funded by and named after Charles Hayden. The Hayden Planetarium opened on October 3, 1935.

While working for the museum and planetarium, Fisher also made several expeditions to observe astronomical events. He led an expedition to Peru to observe the solar eclipse of June 8, 1937. For previous eclipses Fisher flew above the clouds to photograph them. Previously, he was a member of a Harvard University and Massachusetts Institute of Technology eclipse expedition to Siberia, in 1936. Also, in 1943–44 he went with a team of scientists to the volcano Parícutin in Mexico. Fisher also took professional trips to the Bermudas in 1923, and Lapland in 1925. During his career he was also a prolific writer and had many articles published.

== Publications ==
- "Garrett P. Serviss: One Who Loved the Stars" Popular Astronomy Vol. XXXVII, No. 7, August–September 1929
- "With John Burroughs at Slabsides" Natural History: The Journal of the American Museum of Natural History Vol. XXXI, No. 5, Sept.-Oct. 1931
- "The Eclipse in Kazakhstan" Natural History Vol. XXXVIII, No. 3, pp. 203–210, 1936
- "The Meteor Craters in Estonia" Natural History Vol. XXXVIII, No. 4, pp. 292–299, 1936
- "Birds of Oxford, Ohio and Vicinity"
- "Exploring Heavens" 1937
- "Astronomy" (with Marian Lockwood) 1940
- "The True Story of the Moon" 1943

Fisher was also editor of Nature's Secrets (Halcyon House, 1927) which was later known as the Nature Encyclopedia (5 volumes, Nelson Doubleday, 1927); and was co-editor with Marion L. Langham of the Nature Science Series (Noble and Noble, 1934). He also lectured frequently on John Burroughs.

== Personal life ==
Fisher married his first wife, Bessie Wiley on August 29, 1905. They had three children together: Ruth Anna, Beth Elinor, and Katherine Wiley. They divorced in 1933. On September 28, 1933 he married Te Ata, a Chickasaw storyteller. They remained married until his death on January 7, 1949.
