= White House of the Chickasaws =

Historic house in Oklahoma, United States

- U.S. National Register of Historic Places
- Location within Oklahoma Location within the United States
- Nearest city: Milburn, Oklahoma
- Coordinates: 34°12′31″N 96°32′46″W
- Area: 0.1 acres (0.040 ha)
- Built: 1895
- Architects: Waltham, W.A.
- Architectural style: Queen Anne
- NRHP reference No.: 71000662
- Added to NRHP: August 5, 1971

The White House of the Chickasaws in Milburn, Oklahoma was built in 1895. It was designed by Dallas architect W.A. Waltham in the Queen Anne style. (Note: A news report about the house said that Douglas Johnston's wife Bettie wanted to name their home as "Breezy Meadows.) The house is also known as Gov. Douglas H. Johnston House, because Chickasaw Governor Douglas Hancock Johnston and his descendants resided in the mansion from 1898 to 1971 when the building was listed on the National Register of Historic Places. At the time of its construction, the house was on the north edge of the community of Emet, Oklahoma, where Johnston operated a store, but its formal street address is now 6379 E. Mansion Dr., Milburn, Oklahoma

On July 21, 1902, Johnston Murray, the son of Oklahoma Governor William H. Murray, was born at the mansion. (Note: At the time, William H. Murray was serving as Douglas Johnston's attorney.) William H. Murray had married Mary Alice Hearrell, one of Johnston's nieces, and their son, Johnston Murray, would go on to become the 14th Oklahoma Governor. Julie Chisholm, a granddaughter of Jesse Chisholm and a niece of the Johnstons, was also married in the mansion.

The house is now a historic house museum owned by the Chickasaw Nation and has been restored to a 1900 appearance. It was listed on the National Register of Historic Places on August 5, 1971, under Criteria A and C. At that time, the house was still owned by descendants of the Governor.

== Construction ==
The house design was a gingerbread style, commonly used in Victorian architecture during the late 19th century. (Note: However, this style was rarely used on the American frontier (e.g., Indian Territory.)

The center section of the house had four rooms. From south to north these were:

- Parlor room (aka music room);
- Sitting room (aka library);
- State dining room;
- Kitchen.

Two-room wings flanked the center. The one on the west was separated from the sitting room by an open breezeway. This wing comprised Governor Johnston"s bedroom and office.

General construction lumber was obtained locally, but most of the finishing lumber was transported by wagon from Denison, Texas. The two ornate fireplaces inside the house had mantles and facings made of cherry mahogany, which were brought from Chattanooga, Tennessee. The porch that originally encircled the house used imported walnut for the ornamental woodwork.

The house is well-preserved. Only a few changes have been made to the original design. Around 1903 or 1904, the breezeway was removed and replaced with a stairway that led to the attic area, where a bedroom and bathroom had been added. Indoor bathrooms were added later, and lighting changed from the original coal-oil lamps (both hanging and standing).
