= Kathleen Wilcoxson =

American politician (born 1948)

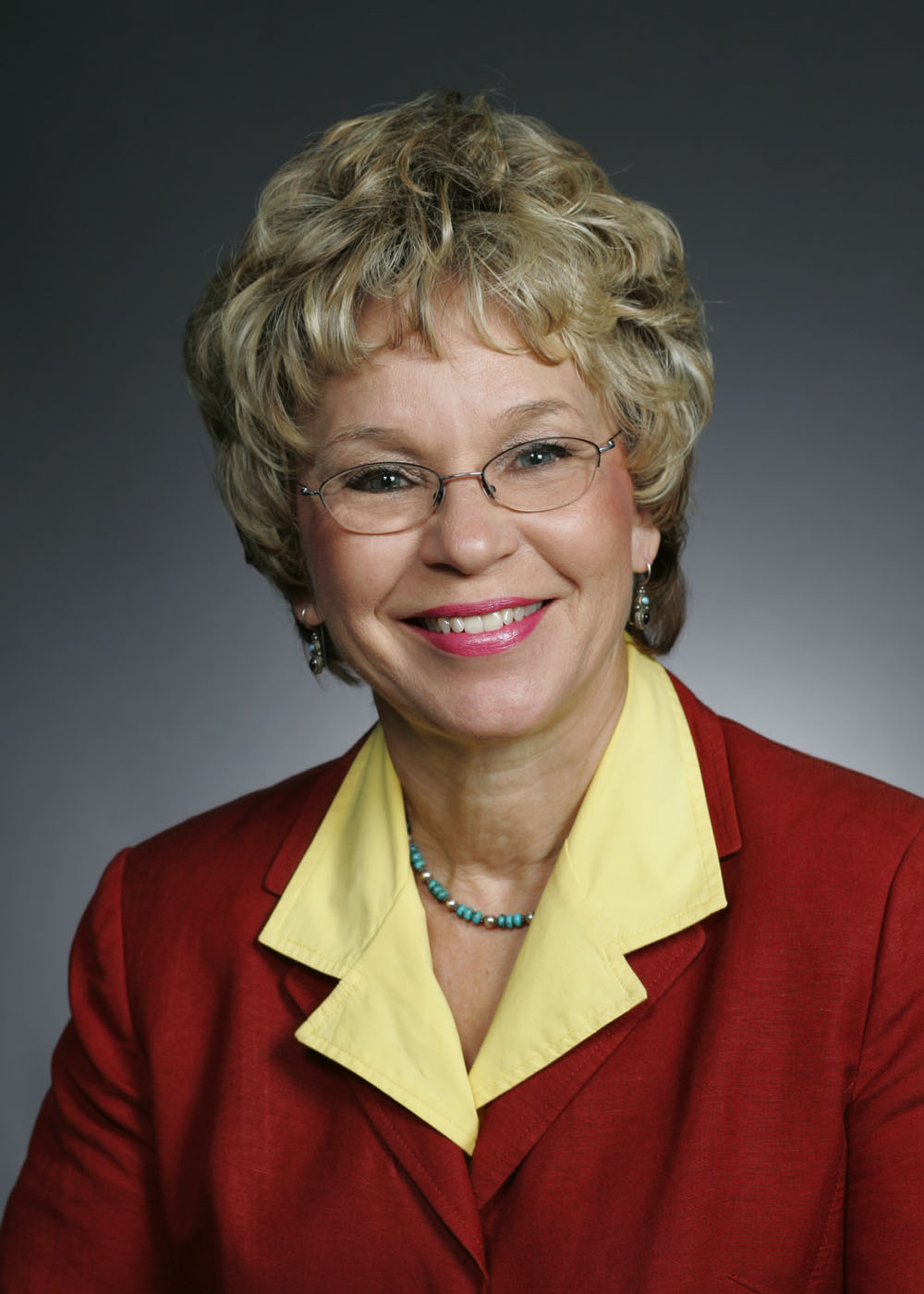

Member of the Oklahoma Senate from the 45th district
- In office 1996–2008
- Preceded by: Helen Cole
- Succeeded by: Steve Russell

Personal details
- Born: January 2, 1948 (age 78) Lawton, Oklahoma, U.S.
- Party: Republican
- Education: Oklahoma State University, Southwestern Oklahoma State University
- Profession: educator

Kathleen Wilcoxson (born January 2, 1948) is an American politician from Oklahoma. Wilcoxson represented Oklahoma Senate District 45 from 1996 to 2008, serving the twelve years allowed under term limits.

== Early life and career ==
Wilcoxson grew up in Owasso, Oklahoma. She graduated from Southwestern Oklahoma State University with a bachelor's degree in elementary education. She then attended Oklahoma State University where she earned both her master's degree in special education and doctorate degree in curriculum and instruction. Wilcoxson began to teach in 1970. She was appointed by President Ronald Reagan to the National Advisory Council on Adult Basic Education in 1982 where she served four years. In 1990, Wilcoxson was selected as Oklahoma City Teacher of the Year. After her retirement from the Senate she returned to the classroom, teaching elementary school in the Western Heights School District.

== Oklahoma Senate ==
During her time in the legislature, Wilcoxson served as Co-Chair of the Education Committee. She is a strong proponent of Oklahoma implementing a voucher program for students.

== Senate Committees ==
- Education (Co-Chair)
- Appropriations Subcommittee on Education
- Criminal Jurisprudence
- Finance
- Health and Human Resources

=== Other Involvements ===
Aside from her career in education and time as a public representative, Wilcoxson was involved in numerous organizations, including:

- Member of the Moore, Mustang, and South Oklahoma City Chambers of Commerce
- Board of Trustees for the Oklahoma Foundation for Excellence
- American Business Women’s Association
- Republican Women’s Club
