= Bloomfield Academy (Oklahoma) =

- Bloomfield Academy Site
- U.S. National Register of Historic Places
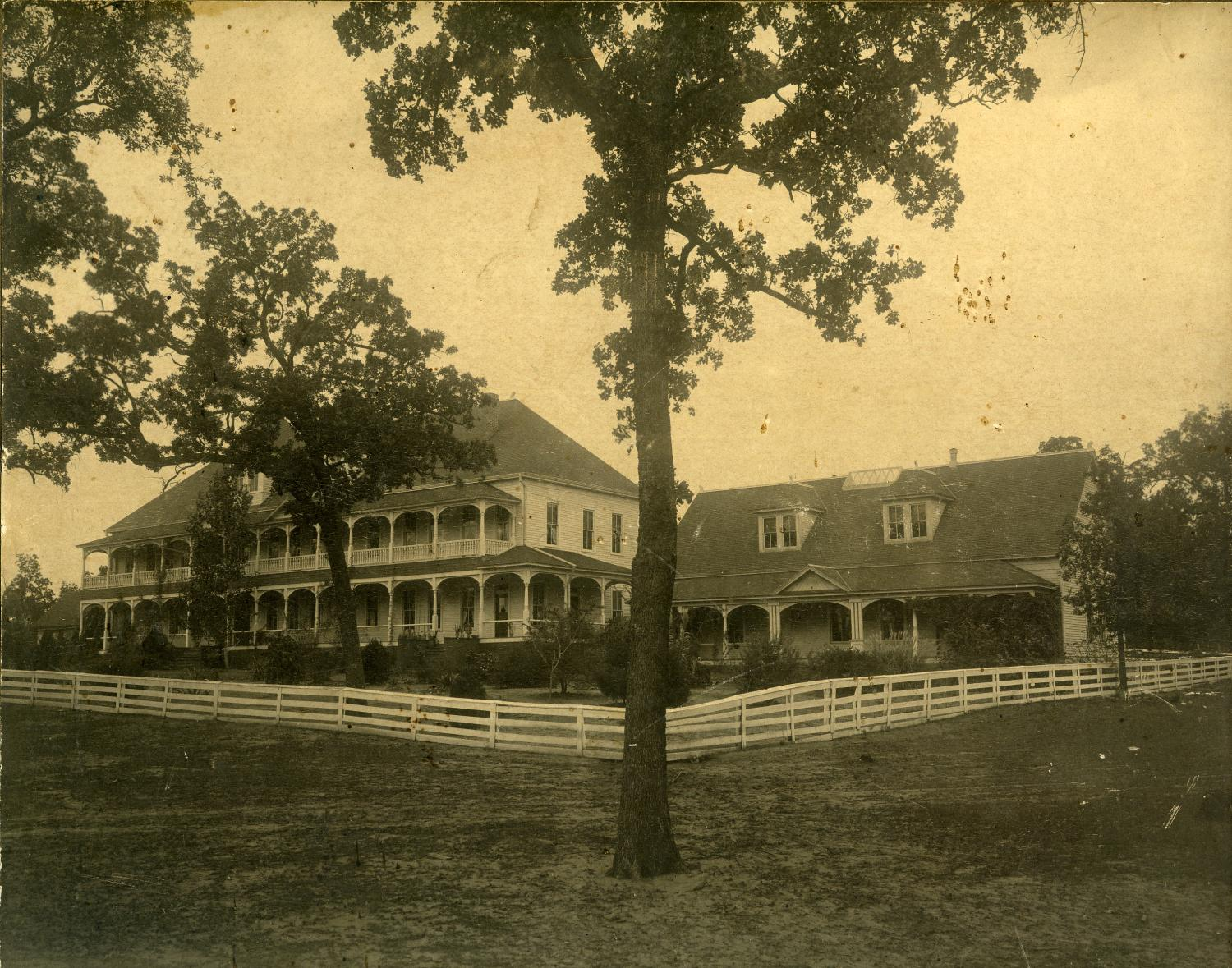
- Bloomfield Academy prior to January 1914 fire, exact date of photograph unknown

- Location within Oklahoma Location within the United States
- Nearest city: Achille, Oklahoma
- Coordinates: 33°47′58″N 96°23′1″W
- Built: 1852
- NRHP reference No.: 72001055
- Added to NRHP: November 15, 1972

Bloomfield Academy was a Chickasaw school for girls founded in 1852 by the Reverend John Harpole Carr, located in the Chickasaw Nation in Indian Territory, about 3 miles (4.8 km) southeast of the present town of Achille, Oklahoma. A boarding school funded by both the Missouri Conference of the Methodist Church and the government of the Chickasaw Nation, it operated there until 1914, which a major fire destroyed most buildings. Now privately owned, the site of the former academy near Achille was listed on the National Register of Historic Places in 1972.

The academy relocated to a new facility in Ardmore, Oklahoma. In 1934 it was renamed as Carter Seminary. In 2004, Carter Seminary moved to a new campus on Lake Texoma, where it continues to operate. It is part of the Chickasaw Children's Village, which offers a variety of programs for youth.

The Academy and all other boarding schools in Indian Territory had closed during the Civil War. The property was taken over by the Chickasaw Battalion, a Confederate Army unit. After the war, Carr was appointed to a new position by the Methodist Church South. (The church had split into regional organizations before the Civil War, largely over the issue of slavery.) Carr's second wife died and, after he married for a third time in 1865, the couple moved to Texas.

The Chickasaw Nation government took control of Bloomfield Academy and reopened it in 1867, establishing it as coeducational. A series of superintendents directed the school. In 1876 a school for boys was authorized by the Chickasaw council, and Bloomfield returned to serving girls only. Perhaps the most notable superintendent was Douglas H. Johnston, a Chickasaw alumnus who served in the post from 1880 until 1895. In 1897, Johnston was elected as governor of the Chickasaw Nation, a position he held until the Chickasaw government was abolished in 1907 by Oklahoma Statehood.

== Pre-Civil War ==
In the fall of 1847, the Missouri Conference appointed Rev. Carr to superintend the construction of Bloomfield Academy in the Choctaw Nation. A licensed Methodist preacher, he had joined the "Indian Mission Conference" in 1845; he served on the Doaksville circuit for six years. His first wife, Harriet, died in 1847.

Carr continued his work for the school and remarried in June 1852, to Angelina Hosmer, a native of Massachusetts. As was typical of missionary wives, his new wife joined the Academy's faculty. In 1852, Carr selected a site and began construction of the school, performing some of the manual labor himself.

Funding was always tight. The Academy received an annual contribution of $1000 from a fund that Congress had approved for George Washington, but which the former president had set apart for educational purposes. The Choctaw Nation and later the Chickasaw Nation contributed two-thirds of the annual operating expenses, (Note: The Chickasaw were considered part of the Choctaw Nation at the time the Five Civilized Tribes were forced to remove to Indian Territory. In 1856, the two Nations separated amicably, so that the Chickasaw had control over their own land and government.) while the Methodist Board contributed one-third. Carr was able to limit expenditures by performing all the carpentry and cabinet work, as he was a skilled woodworker.

In addition, he supervised the cultivation of corn, wheat and potatoes on the Academy property. He added two orchards producing peaches, plums and apples. It was typical of boarding schools to raise most of their own food. Mrs. Carr taught the girls handicrafts ("fancy work") and music.

Prior to the Civil War, Bloomfield's curriculum consisted of basic academics, and domestic and religious topics. Domestic classes covered sewing, cooking and housework, such as that the girls could expect to be responsible for. Carr had the students memorize Christian scriptures, in an effort to convert them from Chickasaw traditions.

== Civil War ==
When the Civil War broke out in 1861, Bloomfield and all other boarding schools in Indian Territory were closed. Many of the Chickasaw men enlisted on the Confederate side. Bloomfield Academy closed in May 1861. The Carrs continued to live at the facility, and Angelina Carr died here in September 1864. During the war, the facility operated as a free private school for Chickasaw students.

Initially, the Chickasaw Battalion, a Confederate Army unit, planned to occupy it, but the facility was not large enough for all the soldiers. While the Carr family remained, the soldiers camped outdoors and used a small building in the yard for a doctor's office. They also used the sitting room for stores, and the school house as a hospital. Near the end of the war, Rev. Carr learned that his oldest son, Joel Henry, who had been promoted to first lieutenant, had died of a gunshot wound.

== Post Civil War ==
=== Carrs move to Texas ===
Rev. Carr married his third wife, S. J. Johnson, a teacher at the academy, in August 1865. (Note: Miss Carr had been recruited by Carr earlier to teach at the Academy.) In September 1866, the Indian Mission Annual Conference met at Bloomfield. Carr was appointed Presiding Elder of Choctaw and Chickasaw District.

The Carrs left Bloomfield in December 1867. They settled in Paris, Texas. No longer Presiding Elder, Carr served for a time as a supply (substitute minister) on the local circuit. Because of illnesses within his family, he was needed at home, and took a job at a local furniture store. Rev. Carr contracted pneumonia and died on December 29, 1876.

=== Post-war Bloomfield becomes coeducational ===
In 1867 the Chickasaw government reopened Bloomfield Academy as a coeducational school, hiring Captain Frederic Young as superintendent the first year. Dr. and Mrs. H. F. Murray succeeded Young, serving for two years. Professor Robert Cole led the school from 1870 to 1875. Professor J. E. Wharton was superintendent from 1876 to 1880. He was followed by Robert Boyd, who served into 1882.

In 1876, the Chickasaw legislature had authorized funding for the Chickasaw Manual Labor Academy, a school for Chickasaw boys. Bloomfield Academy was reserved again for girls only. Douglas H. Johnston and his wife completed Boyd's term, and received a new 5-year contract. (Note: Douglas Johnston was an alumnus of the school, one of the first boys admitted as a student after Bloomfield became co-educational.) His wife died during this time, and Johnston remarried in 1885. The couple served at Bloomfield until 1895.

That year Johnston was elected as governor of the Chickasaw Nation. He used his office to promote formal education among the Chickasaw. Professor Elihu B. Hinshaw succeeded Johnston and served until 1906. Hinshaw is credited with obtaining a charter from the Chickasaw Legislature for Bloomfield Academy to confer diplomas on students who completed the school's curriculum. J. R. Hendricks served after Hinshaw. He was succeeded by Annie Ream Addington, who remained in charge until 1914, when the main building burned down. Instead of rebuilding there, Bloomfield Academy relocated to the larger town of Ardmore, Oklahoma. The site of the former academy near Achille is now privately owned; it was listed on the National Register of Historic Places in 1972 for its significance in Chickasaw educational history.

After passage of the Curtis Act in 1898, which dismantled tribal governments in Indian Territory, control of the school was taken over by the federal government, namely, the Bureau of Indian Affairs within the Department of Interior.

=== Postwar curriculum ===
In the early 20th century, the curriculum was adapted to contemporary conditions. According to the Encyclopedia of Oklahoma History and Culture, the school's aim was "...to educate students to become leaders, to participate in both Indian and white communities, and to help Chickasaws transcend significant social and economic boundaries." Domestic training was eliminated, and religious training was de-emphasized. The academic training became more like that of a junior college. The school became known as the "Bryn Mawr of the West."

After relocating to Ardmore, Bloomfield resumed operations. In 1934, it was renamed as Carter Seminary. The new name honored Charles D. Carter. In 1949, Carter Seminary became co-educational. It served as a boarding school for Native American children from all over the United States. It necessarily offered a pan-Native American approach, rather than one focused on Chickasaw culture.

In 2002, plans were made to relocate the Seminary to a new facility and campus of 160 acres of land on Lake Texoma, near Kingston, Oklahoma. The Seminary became part of what is known as Chickasaw Children's Village there. The new facility opened in 2004 and continues to operate.
