= Dolan Nichols =

American baseball player (1930–1989)

- Pitcher
- Born: February 28, 1930; Tishomingo, Mississippi, U.S.
- Died: November 20, 1989 (aged 59); Tupelo, Mississippi, U.S.
- Batted: Right Threw: Right

MLB debut
- April 15, 1958, for the Chicago Cubs

Last MLB appearance
- September 26, 1958, for the Chicago Cubs

MLB statistics
- Win–loss record: 0–4
- Earned run average: 5.01
- Strikeouts: 9
- Stats at Baseball Reference

Teams
- Chicago Cubs (1958)

Dolan Levon Nichols (February 28, 1930 – November 28, 1989), nicknamed "Nick", was an American professional baseball player, a relief pitcher who worked in 24 games in the Major Leagues for the 1958 Chicago Cubs. A right-hander, the native of Tishomingo, Mississippi, stood 6 feet (1.8 m) tall and weighed 195 pounds (88 kg).

Nichols' stint with the Cubs was largely spent during the early weeks of the 1958 campaign. He registered his four Major League decisions — all losses — between May 4 and June 7. Earlier, on April 23, he earned his only MLB save against the Los Angeles Dodgers, preserving a 7–6 win for Don Elston at the Los Angeles Memorial Coliseum. In 41 1/3 MLB innings pitched, Nichols surrendered 46 hits and 16 bases on balls, with nine strikeouts.

Nichols' minor league career lasted nine seasons (1952–1960). He won 80 games, losing 67, for teams in the Cleveland Indians' and Cubs' organizations.
