= Douglas H. Johnston =

Governor of the Chicksaw Nation (1856–1939)

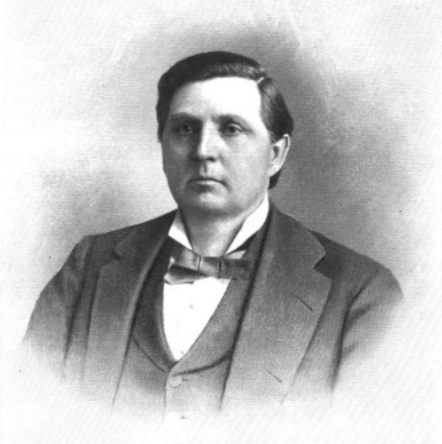

Governor of the Chickasaw Nation
- In office September 1904 – June 28, 1939
- Nominated by: Theodore Roosevelt
- Preceded by: Palmer Mosely
- Succeeded by: Floyd Maytubby
- In office 1898–1902
- Preceded by: Robert M. Harris
- Succeeded by: Palmer Mosely

Personal details
- Born: Douglas Hancock Cooper Johnston; October 16, 1856 Skullyville, Choctaw Nation, Indian Territory
- Died: June 28, 1939 (aged 82) Oklahoma City, U.S.
- Relations: Te Ata Fisher (niece); Mary Alice Hearrell Murray (niece)
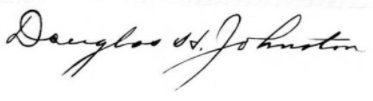
- Signature

Douglas Hancock Cooper Johnston (October 16, 1856 – June 28, 1939, Chickasaw), also known as "Douglas Henry Johnston", was a tribal leader who served as the last elected governor of the Chickasaw Nation from 1898 to 1902. He was re-elected in 1904.

The Dawes Act broke up much of the communal lands of the tribes. It changed how tribal lands were allocated and regulated in Indian Territory in order to allow statehood in 1907. Johnston was appointed by President Theodore Roosevelt in 1906 as governor of the Chickasaw tribe under federal authority. He served until his death in office in 1939.

In office, he was notable for ratifying the Atoka Agreement in 1897 which allotted communal tribal lands to individual households. In the 1920s he successfully sued the federal government in the US Court of Claims, to recover monies illegally obtained from tribal resources.

Prior to his election as governor, he had served as the superintendent of Bloomfield Academy, a Chickasaw girls' boarding school. From 1902 to 1904, he served in the Chickasaw Senate.

President Theodore Roosevelt appointed him as Governor of the Chickasaw after the Dawes Act changed how tribal lands were allocated and regulated in Indian Territory in an effort to push assimilation and prepare for statehood.

== Family background ==
Johnston was the son of Mary Ann Cheadle Walker (1818 – c. 1863, Chickasaw), and her husband, "Colonel" John Johnston, Sr., who was European American. The third of four sons, he was born in Skullyville, Indian Territory, when it was the capital of the Choctaw Nation. In the Chickasaw matrilineal kinship system, children were considered born into their mother's clan and took their status from her. Johnston's name is sometimes given as "Douglas Henry Johnston", but he was named for General Douglas Hancock Cooper. (The latter was a US Indian agent in the territory and served as a Confederate officer.) Johnston had two elder brothers, William Worth Johnston and Franklin Pierce Johnston, and one younger, Napoleon Bonapart [sic] Johnston.

== Early life ==
Douglas Johnston was educated in the Bloomfield Academy and the Chickasaw Manual Labor Academy, established in 1867. Before he was nine years old, both his parents had died. The orphaned boy was raised by an older half-brother, Tandy C. Walker, the son of his mother and her first husband, Lewis Walker.

Growing up, Johnston worked as a farmer and stockman.

== Career ==
=== Superintendent of Bloomfield Academy ===
In 1882, Johnston was appointed as Superintendent of the Bloomfield Seminary, a missionary boarding school for Chickasaw girls funded by the Chickasaw Nation and the Methodist Church. He was completing the term of the previous Superintendent, Robert Boyd. The academy had been modeled on Mt. Holyoke Seminary of Massachusetts. During his tenure, the school prospered. Johnston helped popularize European-American style education among the Chickasaw. (Note: After fire destroyed the main school building in 1914, the Bloomfield Seminary moved to a new site in Ada, Oklahoma, near Choctaw territory. It was renamed as "Carter Seminary" in 1934, under which name it has operated into the present.)

=== Governor of Chickasaw Nation ===
In 1898 the Chickasaw National Party nominated Johnston as its candidate for governor. He won a decisive victory over Hindman H. Burris, and served as governor of the Chickasaw Nation until 1902. His mansion near the present community of Emet, Oklahoma, served as the "Chickasaw White House." This residence was listed on the National Register of Historic Places in 1971.

Although his political critics claimed that he lived lavishly at tribal expense and indicted him in 1905, Johnston was acquitted of the charge.

In 1897, during Johnston's term, the Chickasaw Nation had ratified the Atoka Agreement, to allow allotment of communal lands to individual households of tribal members under the Dawes Act. This was part of the United States plan to extinguish tribal land claims in order to assimilate Native Americans to the majority model and to enable admission of the territory as a state.

Johnston lobbied Washington politicians into passing the Supplemental Agreement of 1902 to modify this treaty, in order to allow the Chickasaw and Choctaw to review tribal citizenship cases that had been accepted by the Dawes Commission. The Citizenship Court rejected nearly four thousand claims that it found false and saved the two nations about $20 million. When it came time to allot tribal lands to individuals, Johnston had to review and sign each claim. Former Oklahoma Governor William H. Murray in his eulogy of Johnston on June 29, 1939, said:

Every allotment, every town lot, every parcel of land sold or transferred from the Nation from west of Duncan and Chickasha to Arkansas, every foot of land south of the Canadian River bears the name of Douglas H. Johnston as grantor, representing sovereignty of that soil. That, in itself, is a monument.

Johnston was elected to a non-consecutive third term as Governor in 1904. This was the last election under the traditional Chickasaw Nation government. In August 1906, without consent from the tribal or federal government, an election was held in which Peter Maytubby won the office of Governor. He never took office.

When the Chickasaw Nation was dissolved in 1906 as a prelude to Oklahoma being admitted as a state, President Theodore Roosevelt appointed Johnston as governor of the Chickasaw. He served in that position until his death in 1939.

In 1907, the legislature of the newly created state of Oklahoma tried to nullify a provision of the Atoka Agreement that prohibited taxing for 21 years the lands allotted to Native American heads of household. Johnston led the court fight against the state. The US Supreme Court upheld the provision in 1912.

In 1924, the Johnston administration won permission to sue the Federal government in the United States Court of Claims and recover money that it had obtained illegally from tribal resources.

== Legacy and honors ==
- In 1907, Johnston County, Oklahoma was named after him.
- In 1931 he was inducted into the Oklahoma Hall of Fame.
- His residence, known as the White House of the Chickasaw, was listed on the National Register of Historic Places.
- In 1997 Johnston was posthumously inducted into the Chickasaw Hall of Fame.

The following memorial to Douglas H. Johnston was published in the Chronicles of Oklahoma:

(He) stood as the accredited representative of his Nation in all matters affecting the well-being of his people. By the exercise of a courage of the highest order, and an immovable firmness in the official conduct of all matters affecting the rights and interests of his Nation and its people, he has won and held the respect and admiration of public officials, both in Oklahoma and in Washington.

== Personal life ==
In 1881, he married Nellie Bynum, a Chickasaw woman of partial European descent. They had two sons and one daughter. Nellie died of tuberculosis in 1886. A few years later, in 1889 Johnston married Lorena Elizabeth "Betty" Harper, also of Chickasaw/European ancestry. They had a daughter together, Wahneta (sometimes recorded as "Juanita") Elizabeth Johnston.

Johnston was an uncle of Chickasaw performer Te Ata Fisher.

Douglas Johnston died on June 28, 1939. He was buried in Tishomingo City Cemetery in Tishomingo, Oklahoma, the historic capital of the Chickasaw Nation.

== Sources ==
- O'Beirne, Harry F.; Leaders and Leading Men of the Indian Territory, Choctaw and Chickasaw (1891).
- O'Beirne, Harry F., and E. S. O'Beirne; The Indian Territory, Its Chiefs, Legislators and Leading Men (1892).
- Cornish, Melvin; "Douglas H. Johnston", Chronicles of Oklahoma v18 (1940) #1 (March).
- Lovegrove, Michael. A Nation in Transition: Douglas Henry Johnston and the Chickasaws, 1898-1939, Chickasaw Nation, 2009
- Parke, Franke E, with J.W. LeFlore; "Some of Our Choctaw Neighborhood Schools", Chronicles of Oklahoma v4 (1926) #2 (June).
- Williams, Chad; "Johnston, Douglas Henry (1856-1939)", Encyclopedia of Oklahoma History & Culture
