= Curtis Act of 1898 =

Amendment to the U.S. Dawes Act

- Long title: An Act for the protection of the people of the Native American Territory, and for other purposes.
- Nicknames: Curtis Act (1898)
- Enacted by: the 55th United States Congress
- Effective: June 28, 1898

Citations
- Public law: Pub. L. 55–517
- Statutes at Large: 30 Stat. 495

Legislative history
- Introduced in the House as H.R. 8581 by Charles Curtis (R–KS); Signed into law by President William McKinley on June 28, 1898

The Curtis Act of 1898 was an amendment to the United States Dawes Act; it resulted in the break-up of tribal governments and communal lands in Indian Territory (now Oklahoma) of the Five Civilized Tribes of Indian Territory: the Choctaw, Chickasaw, Muscogee (Creek), Cherokee, and Seminole. These tribes had been previously exempt from the 1887 General Allotment Act (Dawes Act) because of the terms of their treaties. In total, the tribes immediately lost control of about 90 million acres of their communal lands; they lost more in subsequent years.

The act also transferred the authority to determine members of tribes to the Dawes Commission as part of the registration of members. Thus, individuals could be enrolled as members without tribal consent. By effectively abolishing the remainder of tribal courts, tribal governments, and tribal land claims in the Indian Territory of Oklahoma, the act enabled Oklahoma to be admitted as a state, which followed in 1907.

== History ==
Officially titled "An Act for the Protection of the People of Indian Territory, and other purposes," the Act is named for former Vice President Charles Curtis, a Republican congressman from Kansas and its author. He was of mixed Native American and European descent: on his mother's side Kansa, Osage, Potawatomi, and French; and on his father's side three ethnic lines of British Isles ancestry. Curtis was raised in part on the Kaw Reservation of his maternal grandparents, but also lived with his paternal grandparents and attended Topeka High School. He read law, became an attorney, and later was elected to the United States House of Representatives and Senate. He served as Vice-President under Herbert Hoover.

In the usual fashion, by the time the bill HR 8581 had gone through five revisions in committees in both the House of Representatives and the Senate, there was little left of Curtis' original draft. In his hand-written autobiography, Curtis noted having been unhappy with the final version of the Curtis Act. He believed that the Five Civilized Tribes needed to make changes. He thought that the way ahead for Native Americans was through education and use of both their and the majority cultures, but he also had hoped to give more support to Native American transitions.

== Major provisions ==
=== Abolition of tribal governments ===
The Curtis Act called for the abolition of tribal governments on March 6, 1906. In 1924, it declared all Indians to be citizens of the United States. Due to the nature of the lands in Indian Territory and the dry climate, the 160-acre allotments were often too small to permit profitable farming, and many Indian families had to give up and lost their lands in future years.

=== Land allotments modification ===
The Act incorporated the basic points regarding land allotments and termination of tribal governments that had earlier appeared in the Atoka Agreement between the Choctaw and Chickasaw Nations. The Atoka Agreement had been rejected by a popular vote of the Chickasaw, but accepted by the Choctaw. The Curtis Act required that the Atoka Agreement be resubmitted to a vote of both nations. The agreement was approved in a joint election on August 24, 1898.

=== Registration of tribal members ===
The Curtis Act also scrapped the registration of tribal members that had been conducted under the Dawes Act and ordered new enrollments. This Act extended all provisions of the Dawes Act to the lands of the Five Civilized Tribes. In the end, the large parts declared by the government to be "surplus" to their needs were made available for sale, including to non-Natives. An estimated 90 million acres of land formerly reserved for Native Americans were removed from their control.

=== Incorporation of towns ===
The Curtis Act also authorized the incorporation of towns in Indian Territory. This meant that towns had a legal basis for being laid out, surveyed, and plotted. Any individual could obtain title to the lot in fee simple. The title owner of a lot had the legal right to sell or mortgage the property. An incorporated town or city had the right to self-regulation and levy taxes, allowing them to establish public services. By 1900, the largest towns in Indian Territory had incorporated. These included: Ardmore, with 1,500 residents; Muskogee, 4,200; McAlester, 3,500; Wagoner, 2,300; Tulsa, 1,300; and Eufaula, 800.

=== Provision for vote by residents ===
Residents could not vote for the President or Congress in Indian Territory. The U.S. President appointed territorial government officials, so the question of voting for these officials was irrelevant. However, under the Curtis Act, male residents of Indian Territory, including American Indians, who met voter qualifications were permitted to vote. After Oklahoma was admitted as a state in 1907, residents could also vote for state officials.

== See also ==
- Dawes Act
- Dawes Commission
- Dawes Rolls
- Atoka Agreement
- Aboriginal title in the United States
- Eminent domain in the United States
- Diminishment
