= Tishomingo City Hall =

- U.S. National Register of Historic Places
- Location within Oklahoma Location within the United States
- Location: W. Main St., Tishomingo, Oklahoma
- Coordinates: 34°14′13″N 96°40′53″W
- Area: less than one acre
- Built: 1911
- Architect: Shannon, J.A.
- NRHP reference No.: 75001565
- Added to NRHP: May 21, 1975

The Tishomingo City Hall on W. Main St. in Tishomingo, Oklahoma, also known as Bank of the Chickasaw Nation, was built in 1911. It was listed on the National Register of Historic Places in 1975.

It was "designed, constructed, and finished under the direction of J. A. Shannon, an architect who was also superintendent" of the Harris Granite Quarries, source for its granite.
