= Chickasaw Nation Capitols =

- U.S. National Register of Historic Places
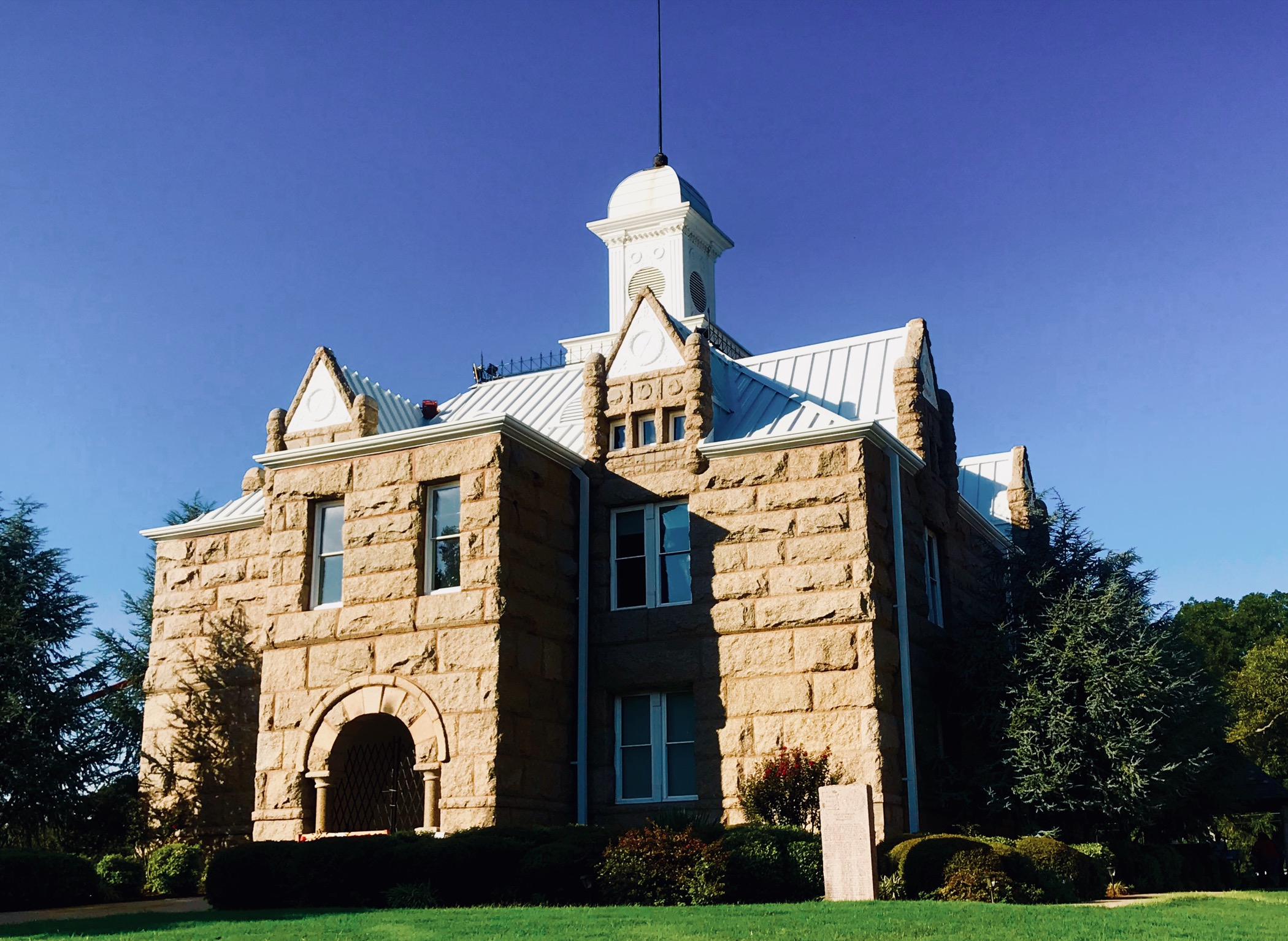
- Chickasaw Nation Capitol building

- Location within Oklahoma Location within the United States
- Location: Capitol Ave. between 8th and 9th Sts., Tishomingo, Oklahoma
- Coordinates: 34°14′17″N 96°40′47″W
- Area: 0.2 acres (0.081 ha)
- Built: 1856
- NRHP reference No.: 71000663
- Added to NRHP: November 5, 1971

The historic Chickasaw Nation Capitols are located in Tishomingo, Oklahoma. The property consists of Chickasaw Council House Museum and the Chickasaw Nation Capitol building, which has been listed on the National Register of Historic Places since November 5, 1971.

== Details ==
The Chickasaw Council House and Museum chronicles the history of the Chickasaw Tribe, including exhibits on their removal from tribal lands in present-day Mississippi during the Trail of Tears and their settlement in Oklahoma. The museum is located in Tishomingo, Oklahoma, admission is free and the museum offers daily tours. It features a collection of Chickasaw artifacts, a genealogy research center and a one-room log Council House, built in 1853. Visitors can also visit the historic Chickasaw Nation Capitol building located next door.

== History ==
The Chickasaw settled on Choctaw lands in the Indian Territory following the Trail of Tears. The Nation became independent in 1856 when a treaty was signed in Washington giving the Chickasaw Nation full ownership of 4,707,903 acres of land and the right of independent government. The Chickasaw modeled their government after the United States, moving from a tribal council to a three-branch system consisting of legislative, executive and judicial branches. It created its first constitution in 1848, and elected officers in 1857. Tishomingo became the Nation's capital at this time, having received its name from the Chickasaw warrior of the same name, Chief Tishomingo, who had died en route to Oklahoma.

== The Council House ==
The Council House is a 14 by 24 foot log building that was originally located at Good Spring on Pennington Creek. A tree trunk attached to its outside wall was once used as a whipping post. This structure served as the location of government meetings until the brick Capitol was constructed in 1858. The Council House was moved and used as a smoke house by Cyrus Harris, the first Chickasaw tribal governor. The brick building was demolished following a fire. In 1898 it was replaced by the structure that remains today, a large granite building, which also served as the Johnston County Courthouse. In the 1930s, the Council House was placed on the west side of the Capitol building, and in the 1960s it was restored and covered by a tile block building that became the Museum.

== Capitol building ==
The red granite building was the third Capitol building for the Chickasaw Nation. It was preceded by an 1853 one-room log Council House and 1858 brick building that was destroyed by fire. The building was constructed in 1898 at a cost of $15,000 (equivalent to $581,000 in 2025) in the Victorian Gothic styles, utilizing granite from the nearby, then tribally-owned quarry. It served as the seat of the Nation's tribal government until Oklahoma statehood.

It consists of three stories, an arched doorway on the south side, and a dome on top. In 1908, the building was sold to Johnston County for $7,500 (equivalent to $290,000 in 2025) for use as the county courthouse. In 1989, the Chickasaw Nation repurchased the Capitol from Johnston County, and today the first two floors house exhibits that preserve the history of this early period of Chickasaw tribal government.

The Capitol building is featured in a 1998 painting by Chickasaw artist Tom Phillips.
