= Milburn, Oklahoma =

- Town
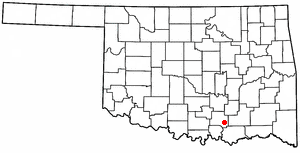
- Location of Milburn, Oklahoma
- Coordinates: 34°14′24″N 96°33′08″W
- Country: United States
- State: Oklahoma
- County: Johnston

Area
  - Total: 0.47 sq mi (1.22 km^{2})
  - Land: 0.47 sq mi (1.22 km^{2})
  - Water: 0 sq mi (0.00 km^{2})
- Elevation: 712 ft (217 m)

Population (2020)
  - Total: 252
  - Density: 537.0/sq mi (207.33/km^{2})
- Time zone: UTC-6 (Central (CST))
  - Summer (DST): UTC-5 (CDT)
- ZIP code: 73450
- Area code: 580
- FIPS code: 40-48400
- GNIS feature ID: 2412993

Milburn is a town in Johnston County, Oklahoma, United States, along the Blue River. The population was 252 as of the 2020 Census. The town is notable as the location of the Chickasaw White House, the former home of Chickasaw Governor Douglas H. Johnston. This home is now a museum and is listed on the NRHP. (Note: Emet was the original site of the Chickasaw White House, but now the house has a Milburn address.)

== History ==
A town named Ellen was formed in the Chickasaw Nation (Indian Territory) in 1856, approximately 3 miles (4.8 km) from the present town of Milburn. When the Western Oklahoma Railroad (later known as the Choctaw Oklahoma and Gulf Railroad) was built, W. J. Milburn, a druggist from Emet, Emet, persuaded the Chickasaw landowner, M. C. Condon, to give Milburn the power of attorney to negotiate a new townsite near the railroad. Milburn tried to persuade the postmaster at Ellen to move his location to the new site and rename it. He submitted the name Condon, which the Post Office rejected. Many names were proposed for the new town. Initially, the railroad wanted to name it Morris, then changed to McLish. (Note: Richard McLish was the railroad's townsite agent) Finally, the name Milburn was agreed upon in August 1901.

By 1904, Milburn had sufficient population to incorporate as a Chickasaw town. After Oklahoma became a state in 1907, an election was held to choose the new Johnston County seat. Milburn lost to Tishomingo.

== Geography ==
According to the United States Census Bureau, the town has a total area of 0.5 square miles (1.3 km^{2}), all land.

Milburn is at the junction of SH 48A and SH 78, 8 miles (13 km) east of Tishomingo, the seat of Johnston County.

== Demographics ==
Historical population
Census	Pop.	Note	%±
1910	438		—
1920	496		13.2%
1930	429		−13.5%
1940	442		3.0%
1950	350		−20.8%
1960	228		−34.9%
1970	275		20.6%
1980	376		36.7%
1990	264		−29.8%
2000	312		18.2%
2010	317		1.6%
2020	252		−20.5%
U.S. Decennial Census

=== 2020 census ===
As of the 2020 census, Milburn had a population of 252. The median age was 41.0 years. 26.2% of residents were under the age of 18 and 14.7% of residents were 65 years of age or older. For every 100 females there were 101.6 males, and for every 100 females age 18 and over there were 89.8 males age 18 and over.

0.0% of residents lived in urban areas, while 100.0% lived in rural areas.

There were 95 households in Milburn, of which 40.0% had children under the age of 18 living in them. Of all households, 48.4% were married-couple households, 15.8% were households with a male householder and no spouse or partner present, and 28.4% were households with a female householder and no spouse or partner present. About 21.0% of all households were made up of individuals and 8.5% had someone living alone who was 65 years of age or older.

There were 110 housing units, of which 13.6% were vacant. The homeowner vacancy rate was 0.0% and the rental vacancy rate was 10.3%.

Racial composition as of the 2020 census
Race	Number	Percent
White	188	74.6%
Black or African American	2	0.8%
American Indian and Alaska Native	28	11.1%
Asian	1	0.4%
Native Hawaiian and Other Pacific Islander	0	0.0%
Some other race	1	0.4%
Two or more races	32	12.7%
Hispanic or Latino (of any race)	14	5.6%

=== 2000 census ===
As of the 2000 census, there were 312 people, 114 households, and 84 families residing in the town. The population density was 654.2 inhabitants per square mile (252.6/km^{2}). There were 124 housing units at an average density of 260.0 per square mile (100.4/km^{2}).

There were 114 households, out of which 33.3% had children under the age of 18 living with them, 57.9% were married couples living together, 11.4% had a female householder with no husband present, and 26.3% were non-families. 23.7% of all households were made up of individuals, and 10.5% had someone living alone who was 65 years of age or older. The average household size was 2.74 and the average family size was 3.30.

In the town, the population was spread out, with 30.8% under the age of 18, 7.1% from 18 to 24, 28.5% from 25 to 44, 21.2% from 45 to 64, and 12.5% who were 65 years of age or older. The median age was 36 years. For every 100 females, there were 81.4 males. For every 100 females age 18 and over, there were 83.1 males.

The median income for a household in the town was $21,528, and the median income for a family was $29,375. Males had a median income of $24,375 versus $18,125 for females. The per capita income for the town was $10,322. About 24.7% of families and 29.4% of the population were below the poverty line, including 29.3% of those under age 18 and 36.0% of those age 65 or over.
