= Tishomingo =

19th-century Chickasaw leader

- Tishominko'
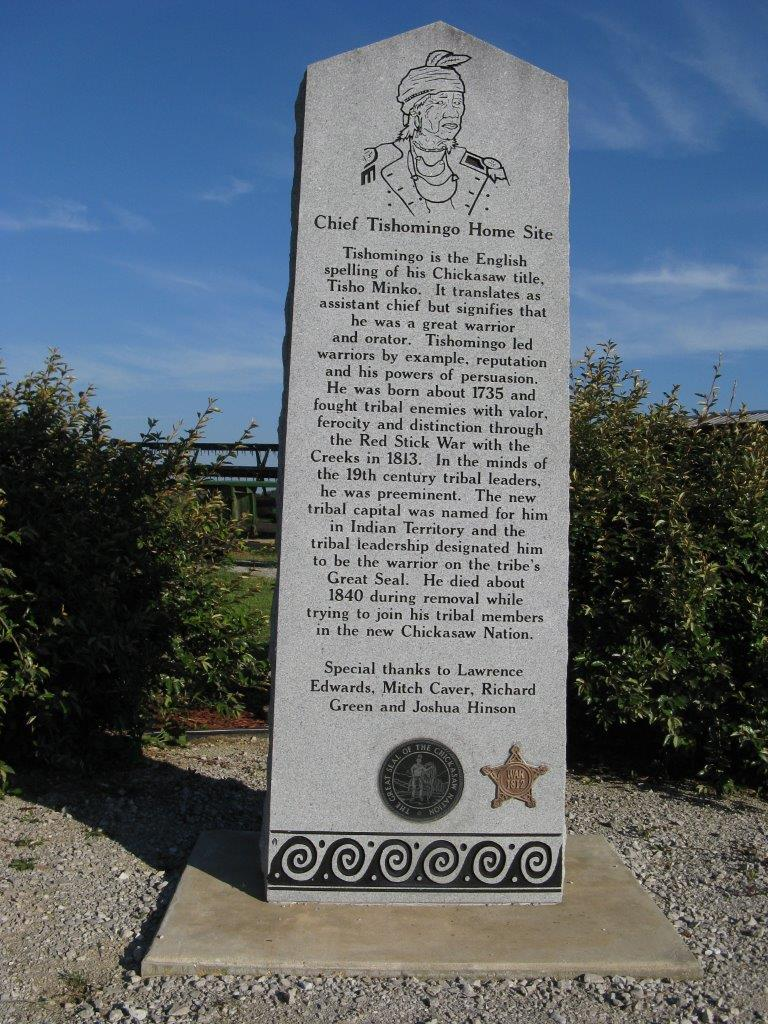
- Chief Tishomingo Home Site Marker in Lee County, Mississippi. (Note: The marker has wrong birth year)
- Born: c. 1758; Chickasaw Nation (present-day Mississippi)
- Died: c. 1837 (aged 79); Brushy Creek, Choctaw Nation, Indian Territory
- Resting place: Choctaw County, Oklahoma
- Military service
- Allegiance: United States
- Service years: 1814–1815
- Rank: Sergeant
- Units: Major Blue's Detachment, Chickasaw Indians
- Wars: War of 1812

Tishomingo (from Chickasaw: Tishominko', lit. 'assistant chief') (Note: The word or suffix, "-minko; -minco; -mingo" was a title of respect and leadership to the Chickasaw.) (c. 1758 – c. 1837) was an early 19th-century Chickasaw leader and the namesake of Tishomingo County, Mississippi.

== Early life and military service ==
Tishomingo was born around 1758 in the Chickasaw Nation (present-day Mississippi). He served with United States Army Major-General Anthony Wayne against the Shawnee in Northwest Territory and received a silver medal from President George Washington. He led by example and was respected for his honesty and high moral standards, serving with distinction at Fallen Timbers and the Red Stick War with the Creeks. During the War of 1812, he served under Major-General Andrew Jackson.

== Later life and the "Trail of Tears" ==
After the War of 1812, Tishomingo retired to his farm until white settlers came onto his land. He traveled to Philadelphia and Washington, D.C., and was a principal signatory of the treaties of 1816 and 1818 as well as the 1832 Treaty of Pontotoc. In 1837, a final treaty forced him and his family to relocate to Indian Territory.

Chief Tishomingo was reported to have had a kidney stone operation March 25, 1821, in Columbus, Mississippi performed by Dr. Henderson and Dr. Barry. The article stated, "...the patient is supposed to be in his 63d year..." This would place his birth approximately in the year 1758.

== Death ==
According to Tishomingo's son Richard, Tishomingo died in the fall of 1838 on Brushy Creek in the Choctaw Nation on the same day as his wife U-Kuth-Le-Ya died. This was during the time both Chickasaw and Choctaw tribes resided together in Indian Territory. Both he and his wife's burials were witnessed by two Chickasaw Warriors who had served with Tishomingo in the War of 1812. They gave their testimony attesting to the facts of the couple's deaths to the Indian Agent, Douglas H. Cooper, on September 27, 1859, in accordance with the requirements of a Bounty Land Application of Richard.

== Honors ==
The county of Tishomingo, town of Tishomingo, and Tishomingo State Park in Mississippi; and the capital of Tishomingo in the Chickasaw Nation are named for him.
