= Tishomingo State Park =

State park in Mississippi, United States

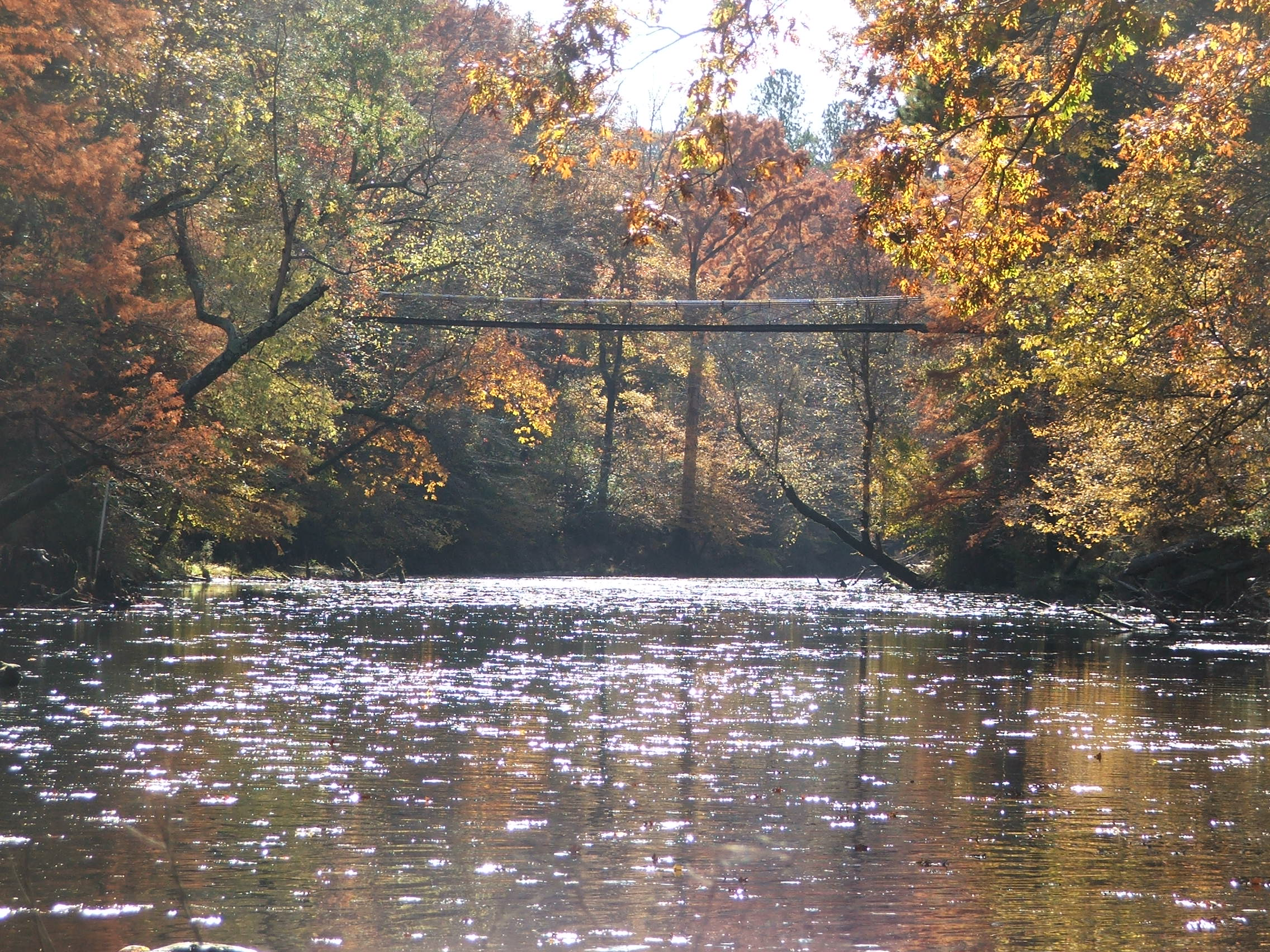
- Swinging bridge over Bear Creek

- Location within Mississippi
- Location: Tishomingo County, Mississippi, United States
- Coordinates: 34°36′40″N 88°12′49″W
- Area: 1,200 acres (490 ha)
- Elevation: 390 ft (120 m)
- Established: 1935
- Administrator: Mississippi Department of Wildlife, Fisheries, and Parks
- Designation: Mississippi state park
- Named for: Chief Tishu Miko
- Website: Official website
- Tishomingo State Park
- U.S. National Register of Historic Places
- U.S. Historic district
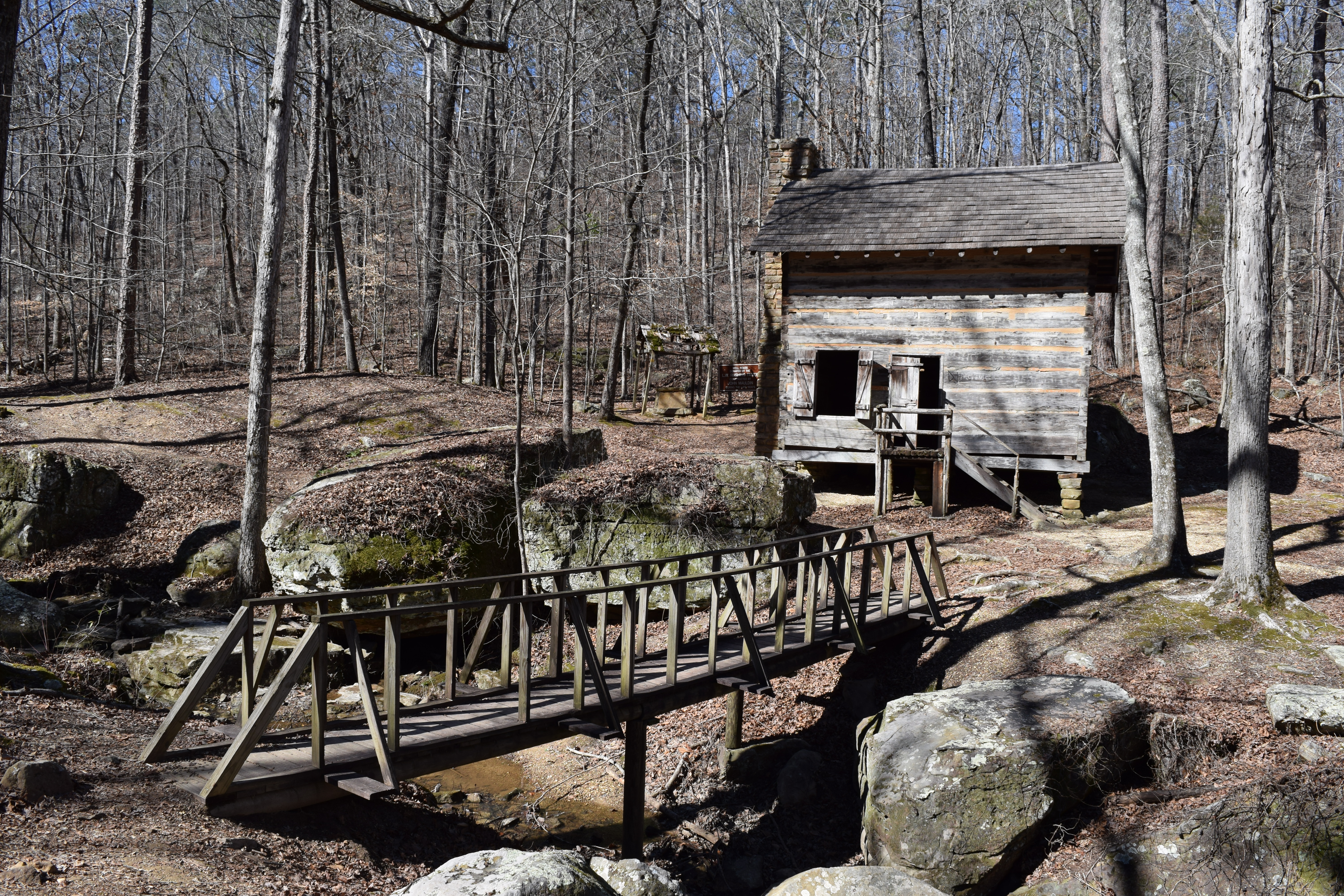
- Cabin located within the park
- Nearest city: Tishomingo, Mississippi
- Built by: Civilian Conservation Corps
- Architectural style: Rustic
- MPS: State Parks in Mississippi built by the CCC between 1934 - 1942
- NRHP reference No.: 98000275
- Added to NRHP: March 26, 1998

Tishomingo State Park is a public recreation area located in the foothills of the Appalachian Mountains in Tishomingo County, some 45 miles (72 km) northeast of Tupelo, Mississippi. The major feature of the park is Bear Creek Canyon and its generous sandstone outcroppings. Activities in the park include canoeing, rock climbing, fishing, and hiking. The park sits at Milepost 304 of Natchez Trace Parkway, a scenic road operated by the National Park Service that runs directly through the park.

== Geography ==
The park pays tribute to Tishomingo County's geography of massive rock formations, found here and in the immediately surrounding areas and nowhere else in Mississippi. The cliffs, valleys and abundant outcroppings of carboniferous sandstone and limestone represent the southwestern extremity of the Southern Appalachian Plateau. The boulders and towering cliffs of Hartselle Sandstone, together with the outcrops of Bangor Limestone and the creek which carves through it all, compose "some of the most picturesque and rugged scenery in the state."

== Indigenous history ==
The park is named for one of the last great Chickasaw leaders, Chief Tishu Miko, born not far from here in Lee County, Mississippi, around 1735. Modern Chickasaw occasionally make pilgrimage to the park to visit the areas where the famous Chief fished and hunted.

Chief Tishomingo (the modern form of his name) served a brilliant career in the US Military, distinguishing himself in such actions as the Battle of Fallen Timbers, the Red Stick Rebellion and the War of 1812. His influence became powerful and extended into Washington, DC. He was a principal signatory to a number of important treaties, including the Treaty of Pontotoc in 1832 (negotiated at great length with Andrew Jackson but never ratified by the Senate). His most momentous and perhaps most difficult signature was put to the 1837 Treaty of Doaksville, which he affirmed only under heavy political pressure. This document, in large part a lease agreement with the Choctaw Nation, incidentally compelled the removal of the last Chickasaw from this area to the Indian Territory in Oklahoma. It is believed that, in May 1838, Chief Tishomingo succumbed to smallpox at the advanced age of 104, near Little Rock on the Trail of Tears. His burial site is unknown.

The park's importance to Native American history extends even beyond the historical Chickasaw Nation, as archaeological excavations confirm the presence of Paleo Indians in the area now encompassed by the park as early as 7000 B.C. The ancient tribes were able to produce excellent tools from the high-quality chert and limestone that was available here, and ceramic pottery from clay dug from the hills.

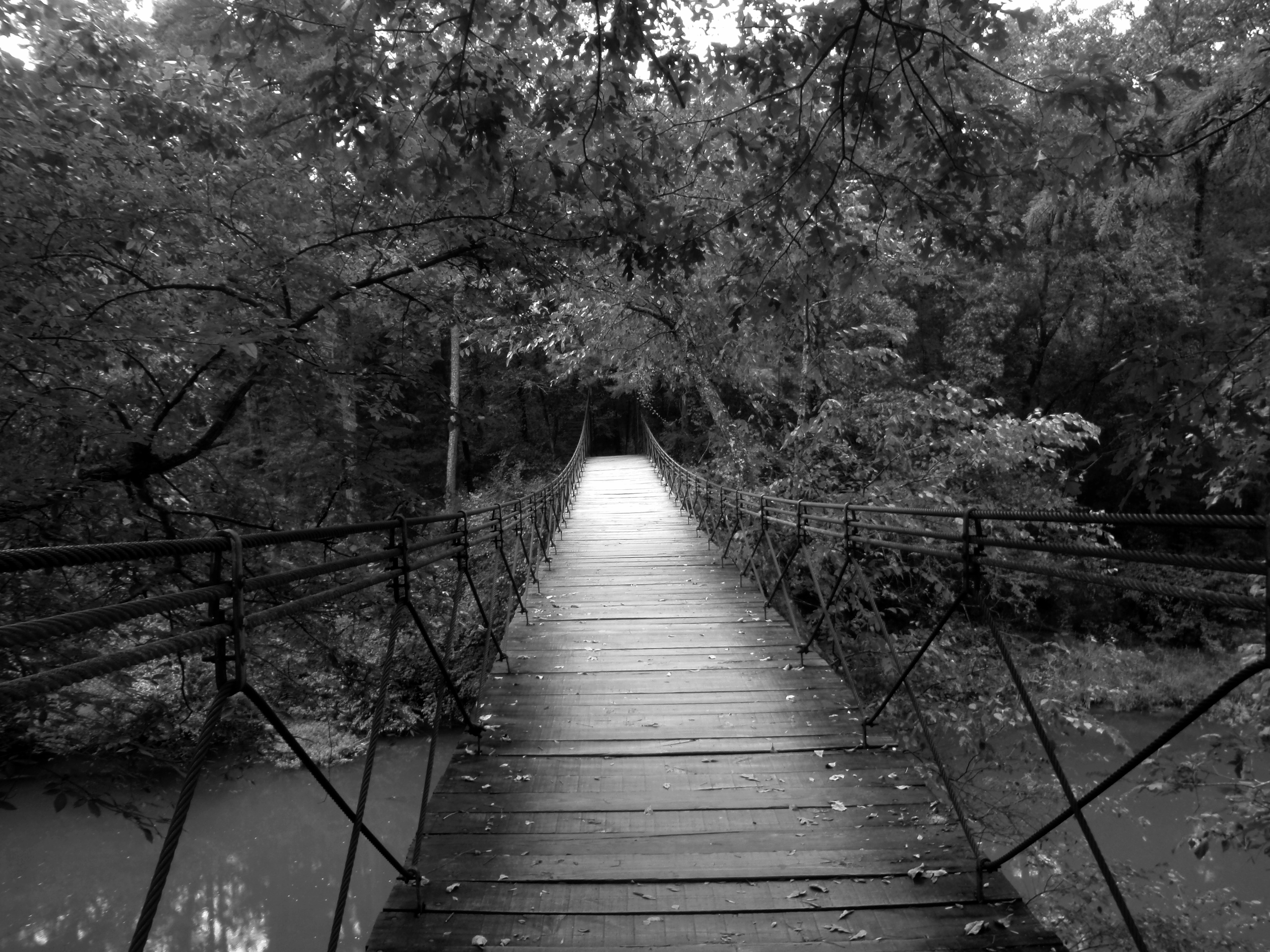
The park's swinging bridge

== Park history ==
The park was among those constructed in Mississippi by the Civilian Conservation Corps in the 1930s. CCC Company 3497 began work creating the park in April 1935; the park opened to the public in May 1939. Many of the original facilities are extant, including several buildings, trails, picnic tables, campgrounds, cabins and a fishing pond used by the CCC workers themselves. The rustic quality of the CCC structures resulted from the use of native materials, their original designs, and the craftsmanship of the builders. While most of the facilities in Mississippi were built of wood, Tishomingo and Wall Doxey state parks feature substantial use of stone construction.

== Activities and amenities ==
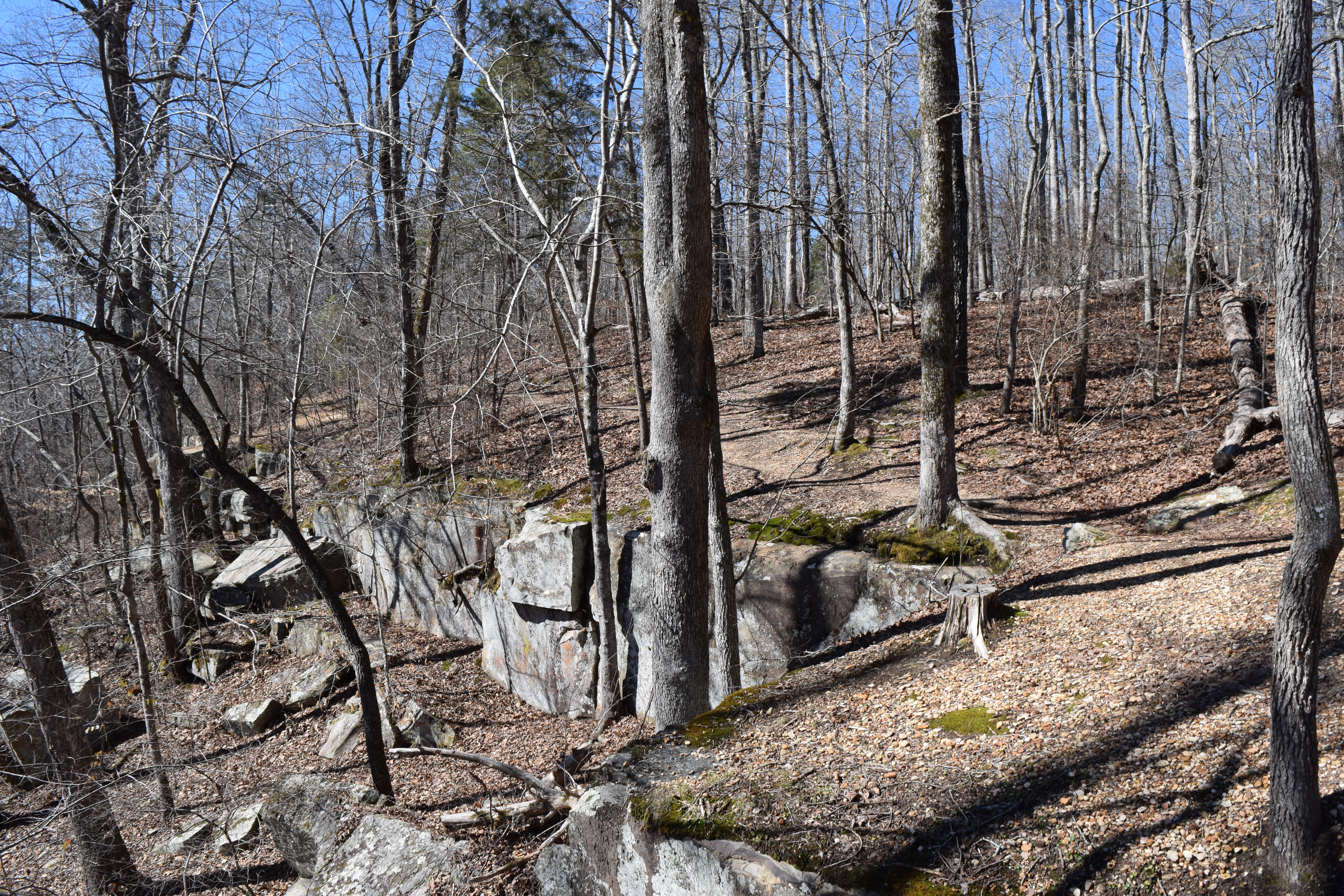
Outcroppings Trail

Tishomingo State Park offers visitors seven hiking trails that range in length from ¾ to 3 miles and in difficulty from easy to moderate. The trails feature scenic natural springs, waterfalls, rocky creeks and streams, cliffs, rock walls and huge outcrops. The terrain suggests mountains, and indeed this is a part of the Appalachian range, but the hills here are no higher than about 660 feet. Rock climbing, which requires a helmet and a permit attainable at the park office, is a popular activity on the trails, particularly at the formation known as Jean's Overhang. Bear Creek can be explored via canoe float trip.

The park has three disc golf courses, an Olympic-sized swimming pool, primitive campsites, a group campsite, 62 developed RV campsites, and furnished cabins. The nature center that re-opened in 2016 has displays of Tishomingo county heritage, nature, art, animals, arrowheads, and memorabilia from the Civilian Conservation Corps.

== See also ==
- Bear Creek Fishweir No. 1
- Bear Creek Fishweir No. 2
