= Tishomingo, Mississippi =

Town in Mississippi

- Town
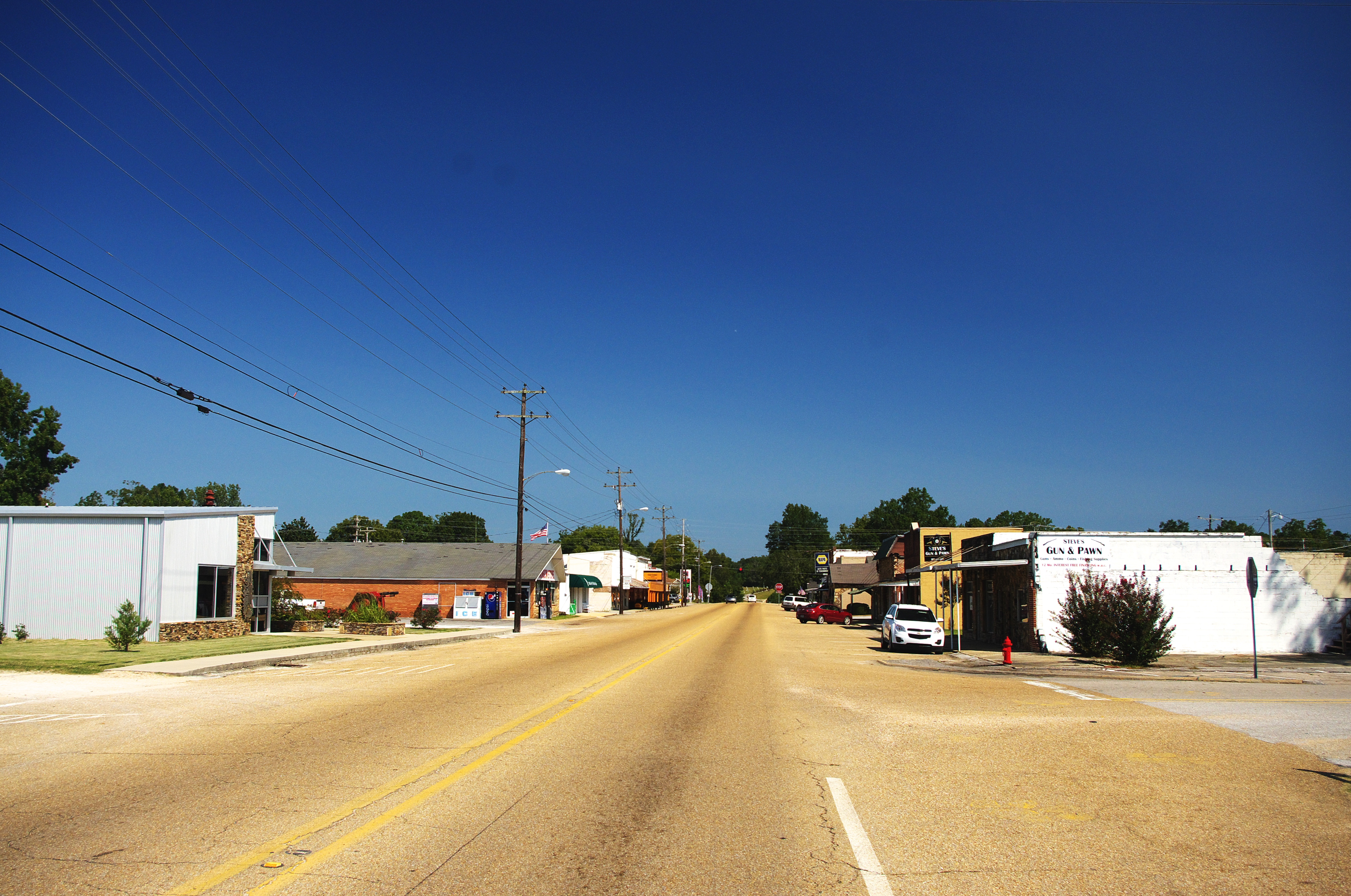
- Main Street (MS 25) in Tishomingo

- Flag

- Location of Tishomingo, Mississippi

- Location in the United States
- Coordinates: 34°37′44″N 88°13′42″W
- Country: United States
- State: Mississippi
- County: Tishomingo
- Named for: Tishomingo

Area
  - Total: 0.85 sq mi (2.21 km^{2})
  - Land: 0.85 sq mi (2.21 km^{2})
  - Water: 0 sq mi (0.00 km^{2})
- Elevation: 482 ft (147 m)

Population (2020)
  - Total: 370
  - Density: 433.8/sq mi (167.49/km^{2})
- Time zone: UTC-6 (Central (CST))
  - Summer (DST): UTC-5 (CDT)
- ZIP code: 38873
- Area code: 662
- FIPS code: 28-73720
- GNIS feature ID: 2406739
- Website: townoftishomingo.com

Tishomingo is a town in Tishomingo County, Mississippi, United States. As of the 2020 census, Tishomingo had a population of 370.

== History ==
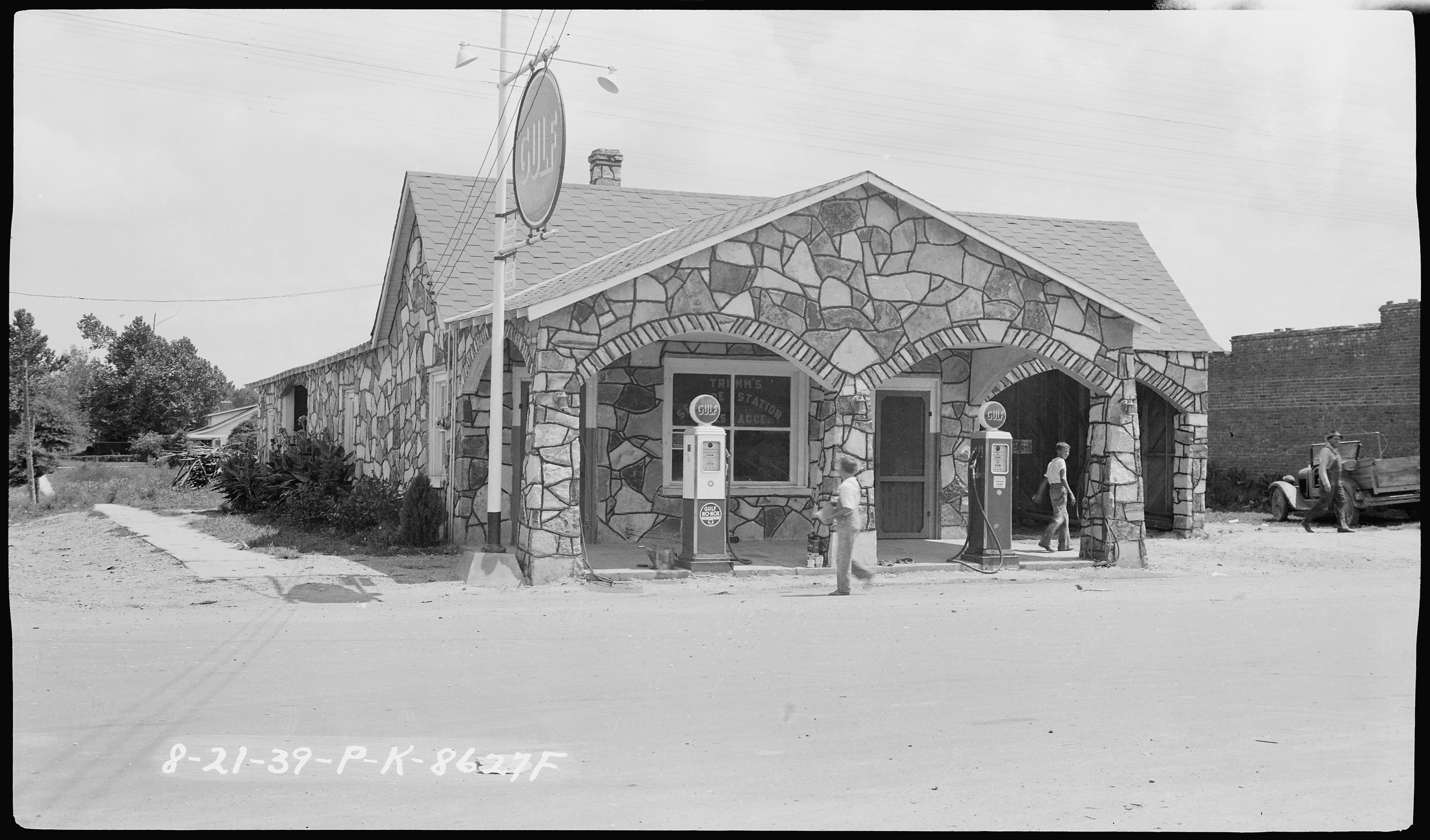
Tishomingo Filling Station (1939)

Tishomingo is named for Tishomingo, who signed the Treaty of Pontotoc in 1832. He served with Major-General Anthony Wayne against the Shawnees in the Northwest Territory and received a silver medal from President George Washington. During the War of 1812, he served under Andrew Jackson. After his service in the military, he retired to become a farmer until white settlers came onto his land. In 1837, a final treaty forced the Chickasaws to move to the Indian Territory in present-day Oklahoma. Tishomingo died of smallpox on the Trail of Tears and is buried in Arkansas somewhere near Little Rock. His son, Iuka, is the namesake of the county seat of Tishomingo County, Mississippi.

This town developed with the building of the Illinois Central Railroad. Andrew Jackson also camped at the site of Tishomingo, on his way to visit the Creek nation.

=== National Register of Historic Places ===
Four sites near Tishomingo are listed on the National Register of Historic Places, including Bear Creek Mound and Village Site, and Tishomingo State Park.

== Geography ==
According to the United States Census Bureau, the town has a total area of 0.6 square miles (1.6 km^{2}), all land. The town is situated along Mississippi Highway 25, south of the highway's intersection with Mississippi Highway 30, and north of its intersection with the Natchez Trace Parkway. The Mississippi-Alabama border lies a few miles to the east, Tishomingo State Park lies to the southeast, and Bay Springs Lake (part of the Tennessee-Tombigbee Waterway) lies to the west. Via MS-25, Iuka, the county seat of Tishomingo County, is 13 mi (21 km) north, and Belmont is 9 mi (14 km) south.

=== Communities near Tishomingo ===
- Belmont - 8.86 miles (14.26 km)
- Paden - 2.51 miles (4.04 km)

=== Rivers and streams ===
- King Creek

== Demographics ==
Historical population
Census	Pop.	Note	%±
1910	212		—
1920	273		28.8%
1930	402		47.3%
1940	423		5.2%
1950	335		−20.8%
1960	415		23.9%
1970	410		−1.2%
1980	387		−5.6%
1990	332		−14.2%
2000	316		−4.8%
2010	339		7.3%
2020	370		9.1%
U.S. Decennial Census

As of the census of 2000, there were 316 people, 144 households, and 87 families residing in the town. The population density was 572.5 inhabitants per square mile (221.0/km^{2}). There were 165 housing units at an average density of 299.0 per square mile (115.4/km^{2}). The racial makeup of the town was 97.15% White, 1.90% African American, 0.63% from other races, and 0.32% from two or more races. 1.27% of the population were Hispanic or Latino of any race.

There were 144 households, out of which 28.5% had children under the age of 18 living with them, 48.6% were married couples living together, 11.1% had a female householder with no husband present, and 38.9% were non-families. 36.8% of all households were made up of individuals, and 16.7% had someone living alone who was 65 years of age or older. The average household size was 2.19 and the average family size was 2.89.

In the town, the population was spread out, with 23.7% under the age of 18, 7.6% from 18 to 24, 26.6% from 25 to 44, 21.2% from 45 to 64, and 20.9% who were 65 years of age or older. The median age was 40 years. For every 100 females, there were 73.6 males. For every 100 females age 18 and over, there were 74.6 males.

The median income for a household in the town was $19,044, and the median income for a family was $31,250. Males had a median income of $26,250 versus $14,107 for females. The per capita income for the town was $18,480. 20.9% of the population and 16.5% of families were below the poverty line. Out of the total population, 18.9% of those under the age of 18 and 27.3% of those 65 and older were living below the poverty line.

== Education ==
=== Public schools ===
- Tishomingo Elementary School - grades K-8 with an enrollment of 350 students
- Tishomingo County Alternative School

=== Libraries ===
- Margaret McRae Memorial Library - a local branch of the Northeast Regional Library System

== Recreation ==
- Tishomingo State Park - 1,530 acres (6.2 km^{2}) of geology and terrain unique in Mississippi. Located in the foothills of the Appalachian Mountains.
- Bear Creek - a popular stream for canoeing and fishing, is a beautiful stream that passes through Tishomingo State Park

== In popular culture ==
- "Tishomingo Blues" was a 1917 song composed by Spencer Williams that became a Jazz standard. It was also the theme music for Garrison Keillor on public radio until his 2016 retirement.
- Tishomingo Blues was a 2002 novel by best-selling crime author Elmore Leonard.
- Tishomingo is mentioned in the film O Brother, Where Art Thou?, where the characters record "Man of Constant Sorrow" at WEZY

== Notable people ==
- Quinton Claunch, songwriter, music producer.
- Dolan Nichols, baseball player with the Chicago Cubs
