= Atoka Agreement =

1897 treaty between the United States, Choctaw, and Chickasaw

The Atoka Agreement is a document signed by representatives of the Choctaw and Chickasaw Indian Nations and members of the United States Dawes Commission on April 23, 1897, at Atoka, Indian Territory (now Oklahoma). It provided for the allotment of communal tribal lands of the Choctaw and Chickasaw nations in the Indian Territory to individual households of members of the tribes, who were certified as citizens of the tribes. Land in excess of the allotments could be sold to non-natives. Provisions of this agreement were later incorporated into the Curtis Act of 1898, which provided for widespread allotment of communal tribal lands.

The agreement also reserved the "coal and asphalt lands" from the allotment process. These lands were to be sold or leased, and the proceeds used for the benefit of the two tribes. Under this agreement, the tribal governments were to be terminated on March 4, 1906. These actions were taken to extinguish Native American tribal claims to the land in order to enable the territory to be admitted as a state. In addition, the federal government representatives believed that adoption of subsistence farming by individual households, along the majority model of European Americans, would help these peoples assimilate and prosper.

The two tribes ratified the document in November, 1897. However, Chickasaw law required that it be submitted to the voters of the Chickasaw Nation, who rejected it. The Curtis Act required that the Atoka Agreement be resubmitted to the voters of both nations. The agreement was approved in a joint election on August 24, 1898.

Charles N. Haskell later told an interviewer that the Atoka Agreement "... was made with the express understanding that it was a step towards statehood,... and went so far as to specify that 'the lands now occupied by the Five Civilized Tribes shall be prepared for admission as a state.' There was no thought of including Oklahoma (Territory) in the proposed state, and it was well known that the Indians objected to inclusion in a state where the whites would have the controlling voice in government."

Thus, the Atoka Agreement was a direct precursor to the Sequoyah Constitutional Convention, which wrote a constitution for the proposed State of Sequoyah and submitted it to a vote of the Indian Territory residents. (Note: About 57,000 votes of the 67,000 cast favored the new constitution, according to Haskell.) Haskell was skeptical that Congress would accept the proposed Sequoyah convention. He met with the tribal chiefs and told them:

"I told the governors that I did not believe that Congress would grant statehood but that they were entitled to it under the (Atoka Agreement of 1898) Treaty," Haskell said. "I told them in the event we failed to secure statehood for Indian Territory that I wanted them to accept the verdict of Congress and support statehood for the two territories."

Haskell said that all the representatives of the Five Civilized Tribes signed an agreement to that effect.
