= Tishomingo, Oklahoma =

City in Oklahoma

- City
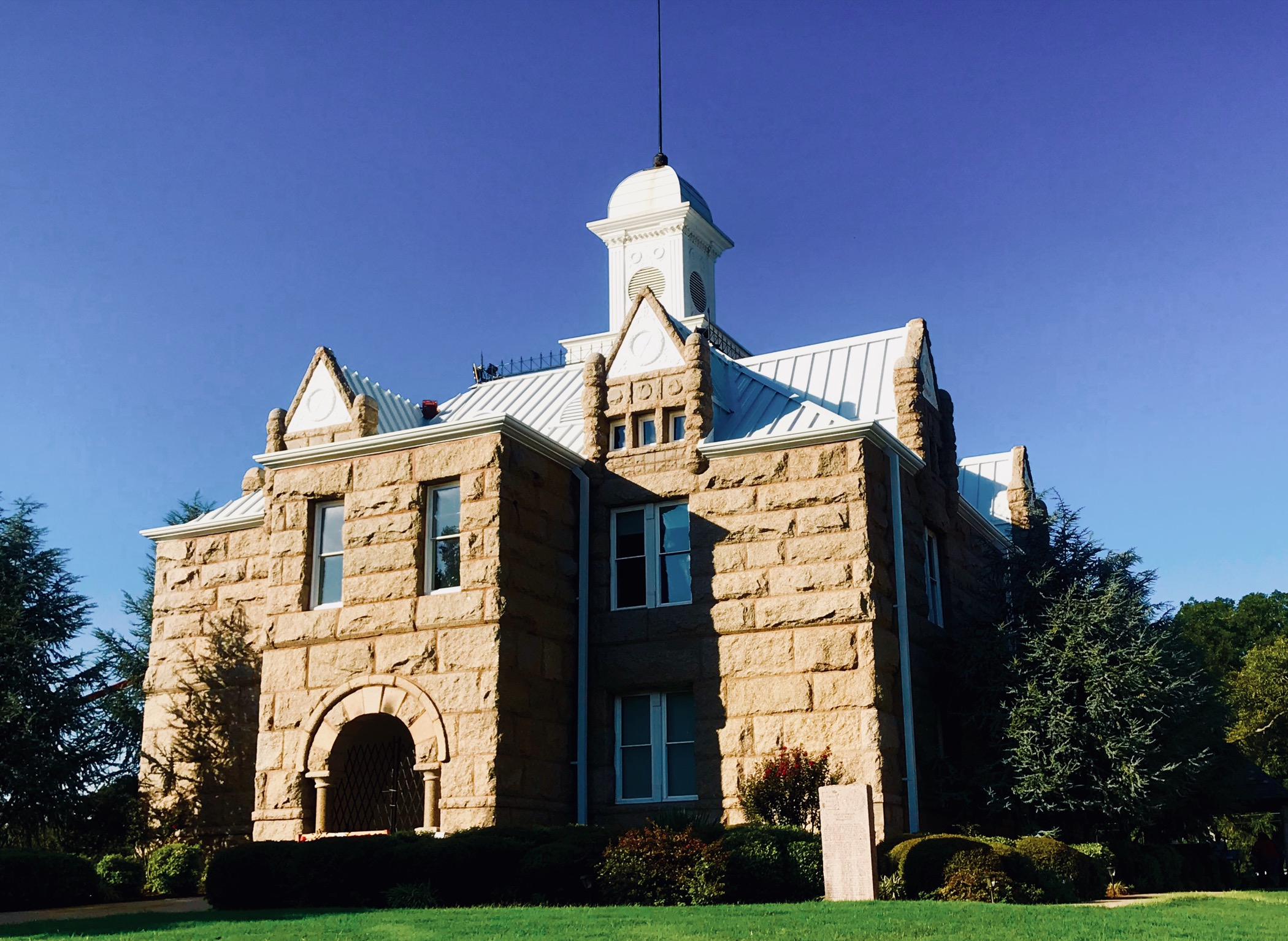
- Main façade of the Old Chickasaw Nation Capitol building in September 2018
- Motto: "Progressive, Growing, Beautiful"
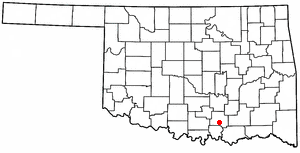
- Location of Tishomingo, Oklahoma
- Coordinates: 34°14′20″N 96°40′59″W
- Country: United States
- State: Oklahoma
- County: Johnston
- Named for: Tishomingo

Government
  - Type: Home Rule (council-manager)
  - City manager: Steve Kelly

Area
  - Total: 5.34 sq mi (13.84 km^{2})
  - Land: 5.26 sq mi (13.62 km^{2})
  - Water: 0.085 sq mi (0.22 km^{2})
- Elevation: 682 ft (208 m)

Population (2020)
  - Total: 3,101
  - Density: 589.6/sq mi (227.66/km^{2})
- Time zone: UTC-6 (Central (CST))
  - Summer (DST): UTC-5 (CDT)
- ZIP code: 73460
- Area code: 580
- FIPS code: 40-73900
- GNIS feature ID: 2412072
- Website: Official website

Tishomingo is the largest city in and the county seat of Johnston County, Oklahoma, United States. The population was 3,101 as of the 2020 census, an increase of 2.2% over the population of 3,034 reported at the 2010 census. It was the first capital of the Chickasaw Nation, from 1856 until Oklahoma statehood in 1907. The city is home to Murray State College, a community college with an annual enrollment of 3,000 students. Tishomingo is part of the Texoma region.

== History ==
Tishomingo was named for Tishomingo, who died of smallpox on the Trail of Tears near Little Rock, Arkansas, after the Chickasaw had been removed in the 1830s from their original homelands in and around Tishomingo, Mississippi.

Before the founding of Tishomingo in 1852, the area was known as "Good Springs". Its several springs made the area an attractive campsite along the road between Fort Washita and Fort Arbuckle. A small town had developed that replaced the old campsites with permanent structures and was renamed "Tishomingo" by 1856. That year it was designated as the Chickasaw capital. A post office was established in 1857.

The Chickasaw Capitol Building was constructed in 1897 from local red granite and officially dedicated in 1898. It housed the tribal governor, the bicameral legislature, and other government officials and clerks. The territorial court also met there from time to time.

The territorial government was dissolved at statehood. In 1910, the building was sold to the newly established Johnston County, organized under statehood. It was taken for use as the county court house.

The Western Oklahoma Railroad was built from Haileyville to Ardmore via Tishomingo in 1902, and bought by the Chicago, Rock Island and Pacific Railway in the same year. It was abandoned in 1938.

Tishomingo Cemetery dates back to at least 1832. Notables buried there include two former Oklahoma governors, William H. Murray and Johnston Murray, and Chickasaw Nation governors Douglas H. Johnston and Robert M. Harris.

== Geography ==
Tishomingo is located in south-central Johnston County. U.S. Route 377 runs through the center of the city, leading south 13 miles (21 km) to Madill and north 40 miles (64 km) to Ada. Oklahoma State Highway 22 also passes through the center of Tishomingo, leading southeast 23 miles (37 km) to Kenefic and west 4 miles (6 km) to Ravia. Ardmore is 31 miles (50 km) west of Tishomingo, and Oklahoma City is 116 miles (187 km) to the northwest.

According to the United States Census Bureau, Tishomingo has a total area of 4.5 square miles (11.6 km^{2}), of which 4.4 square miles (11.3 km^{2}) are land and 0.1 square miles (0.3 km^{2}), or 2.38%, are water. Pennington Creek flows through the west side of the city, leading south 2 miles (3 km) to the Washita River where it becomes an arm of Lake Texoma. The Tishomingo National Wildlife Refuge, covering the bottomlands of the river and creek valleys, borders the city to the south.

== Demographics ==
Historical population
| Census | Pop. | Note | %± |
|---|---|---|---|
| 1910 | 1,408 | | — |
| 1920 | 1,871 | | 32.9% |
| 1930 | 1,281 | | −31.5% |
| 1940 | 1,951 | | 52.3% |
| 1950 | 2,325 | | 19.2% |
| 1960 | 2,381 | | 2.4% |
| 1970 | 2,663 | | 11.8% |
| 1980 | 3,212 | | 20.6% |
| 1990 | 3,116 | | −3.0% |
| 2000 | 2,987 | | −4.1% |
| 2010 | 3,034 | | 1.6% |
| 2020 | 3,101 | | 2.2% |
U.S. Decennial Census

=== 2020 census ===
As of the 2020 census, Tishomingo had a population of 3,101. The median age was 32.6 years, with 22.5% of residents under the age of 18 and 15.5% of residents aged 65 years or older. For every 100 females there were 99.5 males, and for every 100 females age 18 and over there were 98.3 males age 18 and over.

0% of residents lived in urban areas, while 100.0% lived in rural areas.

There were 1,144 households in Tishomingo, of which 31.7% had children under the age of 18 living in them. Of all households, 32.6% were married-couple households, 23.3% were households with a male householder and no spouse or partner present, and 36.0% were households with a female householder and no spouse or partner present. About 37.5% of all households were made up of individuals and 14.2% had someone living alone who was 65 years of age or older.

There were 1,344 housing units, of which 14.9% were vacant. Among occupied housing units, 49.5% were owner-occupied and 50.5% were renter-occupied. The homeowner vacancy rate was 1.5% and the rental vacancy rate was 14.0%.

Racial composition as of the 2020 census
| Race | Percent |
|---|---|
| White | 61.3% |
| Black or African American | 6.4% |
| American Indian and Alaska Native | 15.0% |
| Asian | 1.4% |
| Native Hawaiian and Other Pacific Islander | 0.2% |
| Some other race | 2.9% |
| Two or more races | 12.9% |
| Hispanic or Latino (of any race) | 7.6% |

=== 2000 census ===
As of the census of 2000, there were 3,162 people, 1,218 households, and 768 families residing in the city. The population density was 671.0 inhabitants per square mile (259.1/km^{2}). There were 1,407 housing units at an average density of 298.6 per square mile (115.3/km^{2}). The racial makeup of the city was 73.12% White, 4.65% African American, 15.24% Native American, 0.44% Asian, 0.03% Pacific Islander, 0.98% from other races, and 5.53% from two or more races. Hispanic or Latino of any race were 3.04% of the population.

There were 1,218 households, out of which 30.8% had children under the age of 18 living with them, 43.8% were married couples living together, 15.0% had a female householder with no husband present, and 36.9% were non-families. 32.3% of all households were made up of individuals, and 16.3% had someone living alone who was 65 years of age or older. The average household size was 2.39 and the average family size was 3.02.

In the city, the population was spread out, with 24.8% under the age of 18, 14.2% from 18 to 24, 22.9% from 25 to 44, 19.8% from 45 to 64, and 18.3% who were 65 years of age or older. The median age was 36 years. For every 100 females, there were 88.4 males. For every 100 females age 18 and over, there were 85.8 males.

The median income for a household in the city was $20,938, and the median income for a family was $28,462. Males had a median income of $25,655 versus $16,957 for females. The per capita income for the city was $14,429. About 21.8% of families and 27.1% of the population were below the poverty line, including 31.6% of those under age 18 and 20.9% of those age 65 or over.

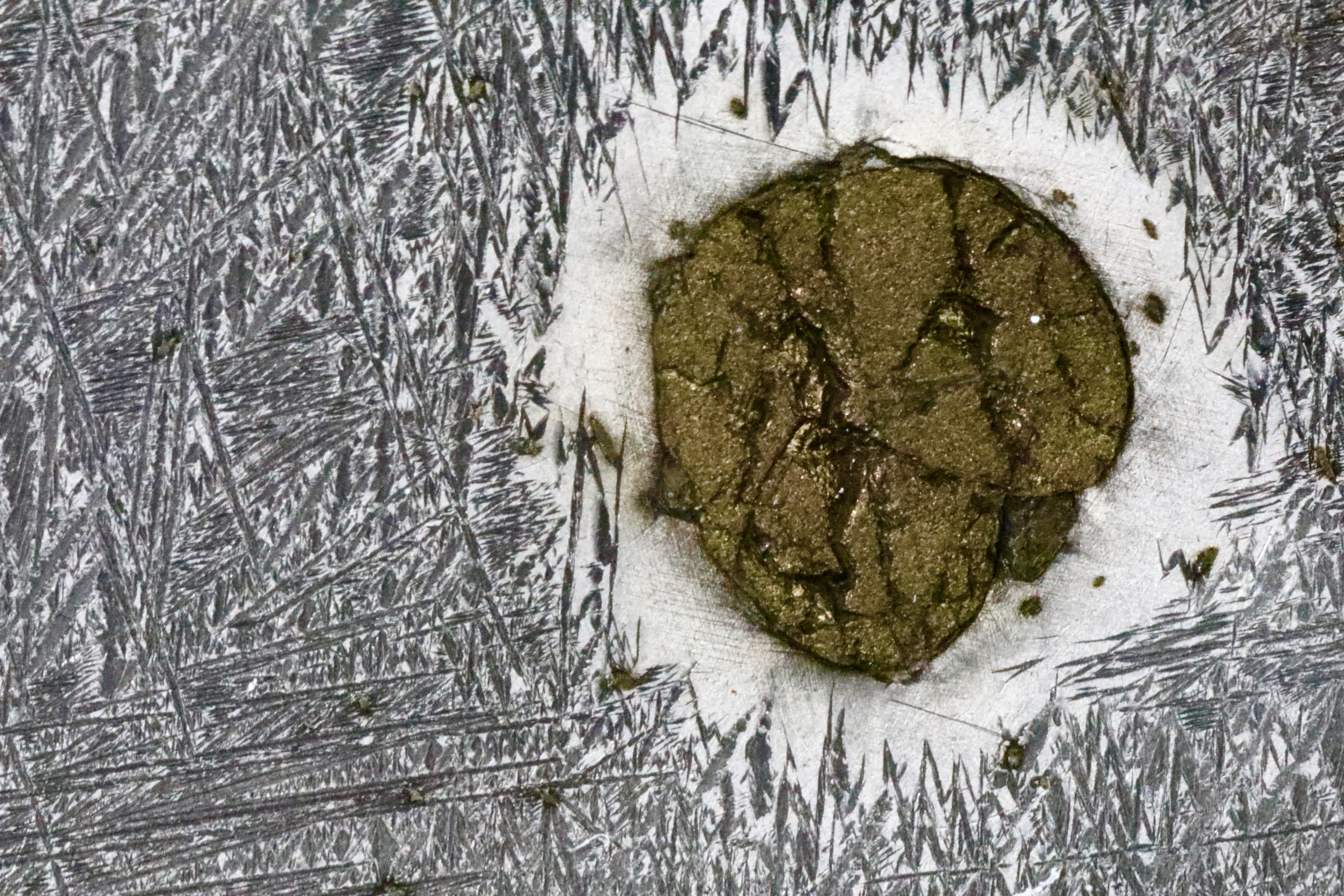
The Tishomingo Iron Meteorite, found in 1965

== Government ==
Tishomingo has a home-rule charter form of government, headed by a city manager and city council.

== Notable people ==
- Bill Anoatubby, former governor of the Chickasaw Nation
- Neill Armstrong, Chicago Bears head football coach, 1979–1982
- Charles W. Blackwell, first ambassador of the Chickasaw Nation to the United States (1995-2013)
- Linda Hogan, Native American storyteller
- Richard Miles McCool, WWII Medal of Honor recipient
- Alfred P. Murrah, federal district and appellate judge
- Johnston Murray, first Native American to be elected as governor (Oklahoma's 14th) in the United States
- William H. Murray,"Alfalfa Bill", 9th Governor of Oklahoma
- Dustin Rowe, Chief Justice of the Oklahoma Supreme Court
- Blake Shelton, country music singer (current resident)
- Bill Spiller, American professional golfer who helped break the color barrier in the sport
