= Acree =

Acree may refer to:

- Acree, Georgia, a community in the United States
- USS Acree (DE-167), an American navy Cannon-class destroyer escort
- USS Lloyd E. Acree (DE-356), an American navy John C. Butler-class destroyer escort

== People with this surname ==
- Cindy Acree (born 1961), US politician
- Lloyd Edgar Acree (1920-1942), US Navy sailor
- John White Acree (died 1942), after whom USS Acree (DE-167) was named
- Neal Acree (born 1974), US composer
- T. J. Acree (born 1982), Canadian football player
