= Tornadoes in Oklahoma =

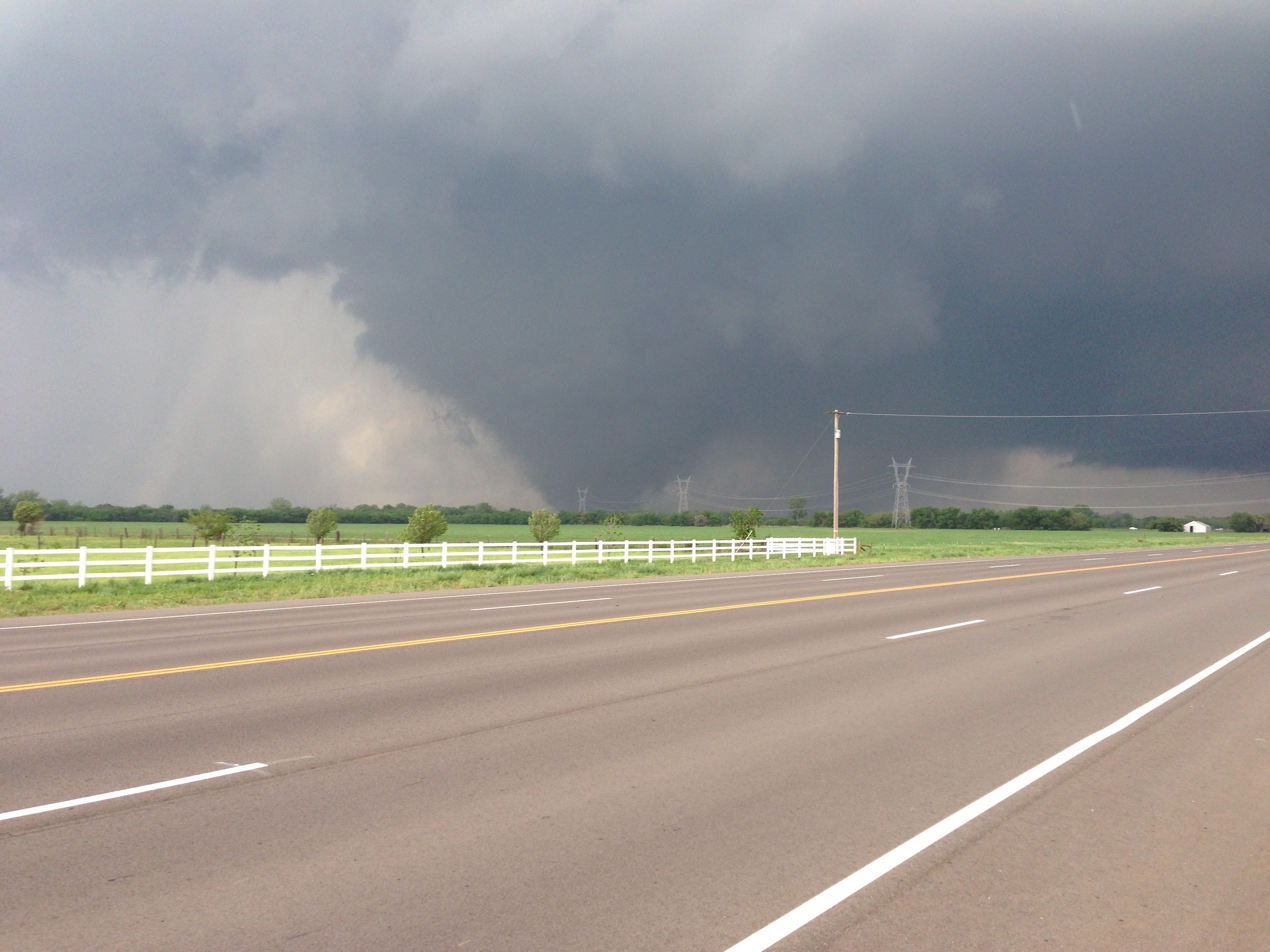
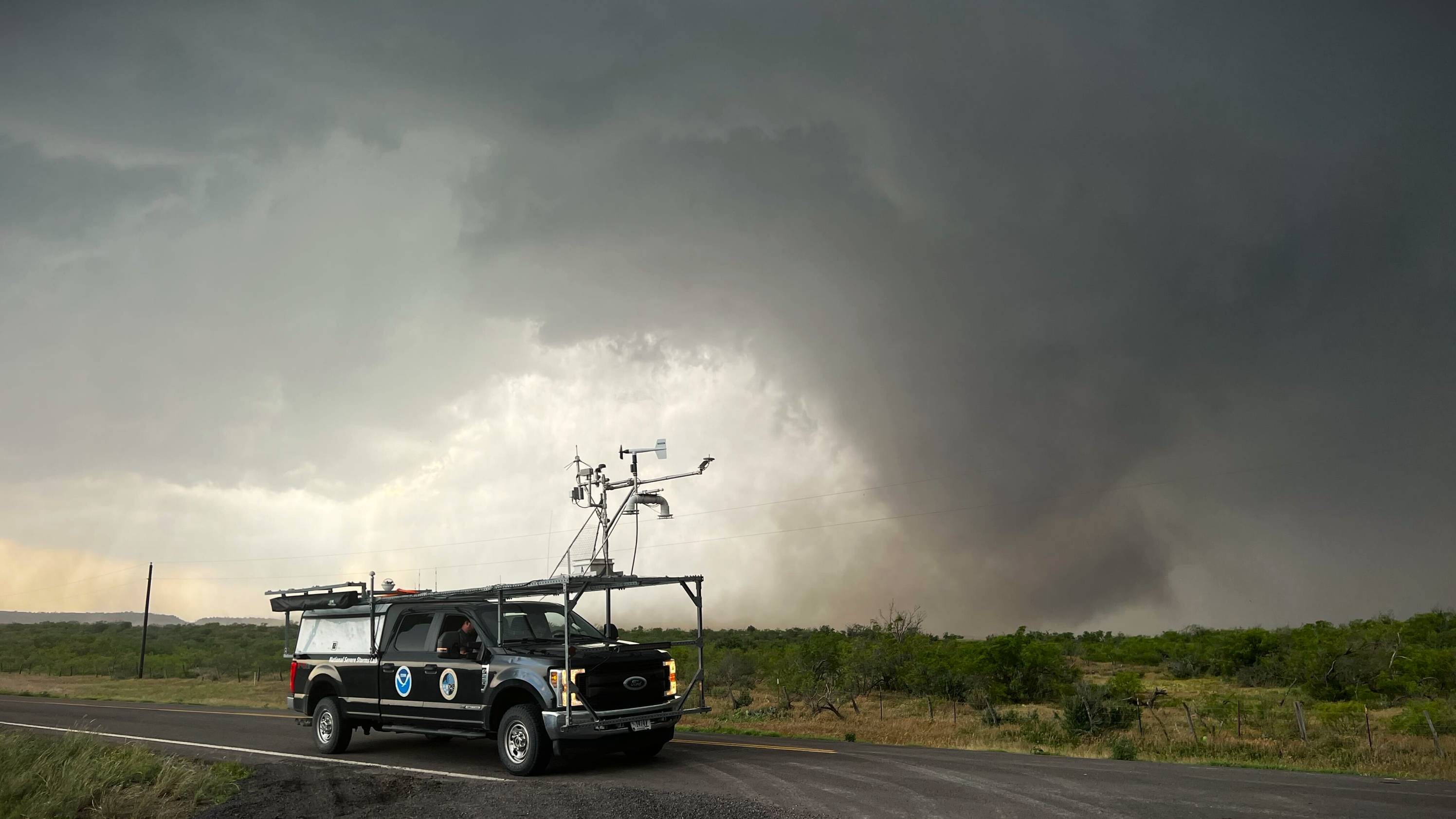
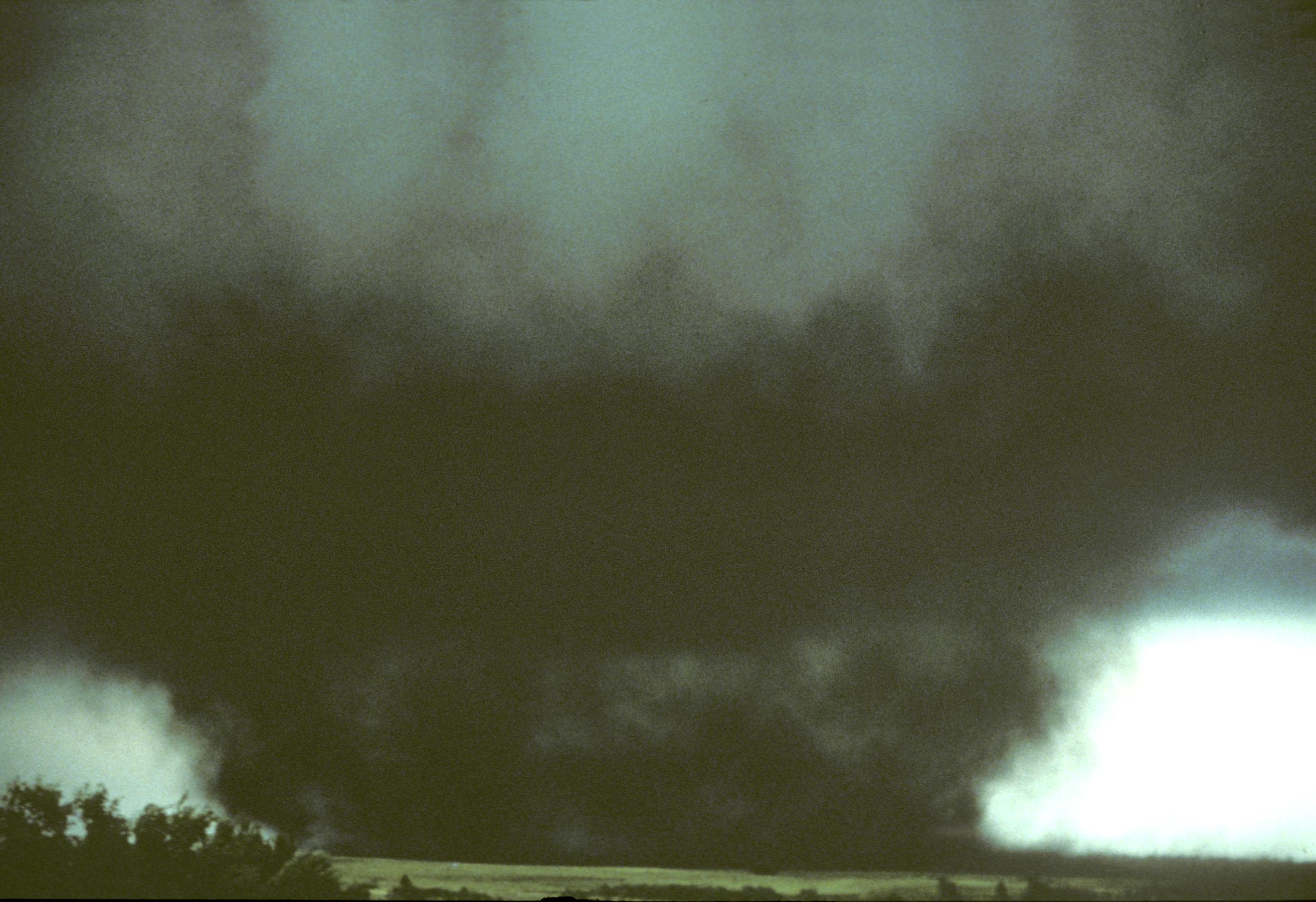
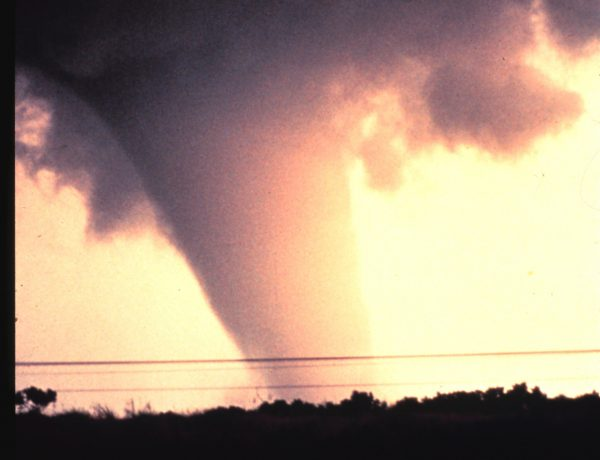
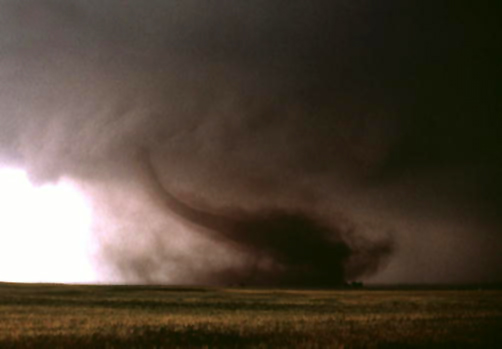
- Clockwise from top: An EF5 tornado in Moore on May 20, 2013; A wedge tornado near Binger; A rope tornado near Cordell; Radar scan of a powerful EF1 tornado near Hollister in April 2024; An F4 tornado that hit Union City; An EF2 tornado being observed by a Doppler On Wheels truck near Duke
- Tornadoes statewide: 4,518
- Location of max. windspeeds: 321 mph (517 km/h) Bridge Creek, Oklahoma F5 tornado on May 3, 1999
- Fatalities: >1,707
- Injuries: >14,000
- Deadliest single tornado: 116 deaths Woodward, Oklahoma F5 tornado on April 9, 1947
- Most active year: 2024 (152 tornadoes)

Several recorded destructive tornadoes have hit the U.S. state of Oklahoma since 1882, the year with the first recorded tornado within state boundaries. Oklahoma, located in Tornado Alley, experiences around 68 tornadoes annually, with each EF3+ tornado killing an average of 2.9 people. 497 tornadoes have been classified as "intense" in Oklahoma, being rated F3+ on the Fujita scale (Note: Official ratings were assigned after 1950. Prior to that, ratings are assigned by tornado historian Thomas P. Grazulis.) or EF3+ on the Enhanced Fujita scale. Oklahoma has seen thirteen F5 or EF5 tornadoes since 1905, the most recent hitting Moore in May 2013. The deadliest sliced through the Oklahoma panhandle in April 1947, hitting Woodward and killing at least 182 people.

Oklahoma was struck by several significant tornadoes prior to 1950, including an F5 tornado that hit Snyder and a large tornado that passed over Woodward and surrounding communities. The first tornado warning ever issued in the United States was sent out for the Tinker Air Force Base area on March 25, 1948, shortly before an F3 tornado hit the base. The 1950s were particularly devastating for Oklahoma, with 546 tornadoes killing a total of 154 people. A large F5-rated tornado hit Blackwell in the early hours of May 26, 1955, and an F4 tornado killed seven people west of Stonewall in May 1959. Tornadoes in the 1960s were less damaging, with a total of 581 tornadoes touching down within state boundaries, killing 57 people. An F5 tornado moved through Prague and Sapulpa in May 1960, killing five people along a 71.8 mi (115.6 km) track. An F3 tornado hit downtown Oklahoma City five days earlier, inflicting $2.5 million (1960 USD) in damages to the city and injuring 57 people.

The 1970s, like the 1950s, was a particularly deadly decade for tornadoes in Oklahoma, with 433 tornadoes killing a combined total of 110 people. The deadliest, rated F4, hit Wichita Falls, Texas before moving into Jefferson County on April 10, 1979. 42 people were killed by the tornado and a further 1,740 were injured. The majority of casualties took place along the tornado's track through Texas. Only 25 people were killed by tornadoes through the 1980s, eight of which were the result of an F3 tornado that moved through Morris on April 26, 1984. The strongest tornado was an F5 that moved through rural Choctaw and McCurtain counties, injuring 29.

The 1990s were a significant decade for severe weather in Oklahoma, with over 55 people being killed by a total of 688 tornadoes. The deadliest and most powerful devastated Bridge Creek, Moore and surrounding suburbs of Oklahoma City on May 3, 1999, where 41 people were killed. The tornado, which received an F5 rating, had the highest measured windspeeds ever recorded on Earth, at 321 miles per hour (517 km/h). The tornado inflicted a total of $1 billion (1999 USD) in damage to the Oklahoma City metropolitan area, making it the second-costliest in Oklahoma history. A large F4 tornado killed two people in Cimarron City and Mulhall on the same day; it was the largest tornado ever measured quantitatively.

The 2000s were less significant, with 483 tornadoes killing a total of 32 people. A large F4 tornado moved through southwestern Oklahoma City in May 2003, injuring 134 people. The first violent tornado to be rated on the Enhanced Fujita scale in Oklahoma hit the town of Picher on May 10, 2008, killing 21 people and inflicting an estimated $15,000,000 (2008 USD) in damages to structures and farms along a 75.5 mi (121.5 km) spanning from Craig County in Oklahoma to Barry County in Missouri. The 2010s would mark a broad increase in the number of tornadoes that touched down annually, jumping from 103 in 2010 to 149 in 2019; the latter was the second-worst year for tornadoes in Oklahoma history, only behind 2024, which saw 152 tornadoes. The deadliest tornado of the decade would again hit Moore on May 20, 2013, killing 24 people and receiving a rating of EF5, making it the last tornado worldwide to top the Enhanced Fujita Scale until 2025. The tornado was the costliest in Oklahoma history and the third costliest in US history, leaving an estimated $2 billion (2013 USD) worth of damages in its wake.

Tornadoes in Oklahoma have broken numerous national and worldwide records. Both the widest and most powerful tornadoes ever recorded occurred in Oklahoma. Two of the top ten costliest tornadoes in history have happened in Oklahoma and the state also has the most violent tornadoes out of any other state. Tornadoes in Oklahoma have also been extensively depicted in media; both 1996's Twister and its 2024 sequel Twisters take place primarily in Oklahoma. Into the Storm and 13 Minutes, released in 2014 and 2021 respectively, are both set in fictional Oklahoma towns that were hit by tornadoes.

== Climatology ==
Oklahoma is located in Tornado Alley, an expanse of land stretching from South Dakota to Texas. Tornadoes are more frequent in Tornado Alley than anywhere else in the world, and Oklahoma sees the second-highest number of tornadoes out of any state. In the alley, warm and humid air from the Gulf of Mexico meets cold, dry air from Canada and produced by the Rocky Mountains. This creates an ideal environment for tornadoes to form within supercellular thunderstorms.

Worst tornado years for Oklahoma
Year	Max F/EF#	Tornadoes	Deaths
2024	EF4	152	8
2019	EF3	149	4
1999	F5	145	42
2011	EF5	119	14
2015	EF3	111	2
1957	F4	107	22

== Deadliest tornadoes ==
Ten deadliest Oklahoma tornadoes
Date	F/EF#	Deaths	Injuries	Hardest-hit community
April 9, 1947	F5	116	782	Woodward
The deadliest tornado to strike within the borders of the state of Oklahoma occurred on April 9, 1947, in the city of Woodward. The Woodward tornadic supercell thunderstorm began in the Texas Panhandle during the afternoon of April 9, 1947, and produced at least six tornadoes along a 220 mi (350 km) path that stretched from White Deer, Texas to St. Leo, Kansas. At least 116 lives were lost in Oklahoma and another 68 deaths were recorded in Texas as a direct result of the tornado.
May 10, 1905	F5	97	58	Snyder
This tornado developed about 2 mi (3.2 km) southeast of the Frances school house in Greer County (now Jackson County). Homes were swept away about 14 mi (23 km) southeast of Altus. From its inception, this tornado moved east-northeast crossing the North Fork of the Red River near the mouth of Otter Creek. The tornado followed very close to Otter Creek curving to the northeast through what is now northern Tillman County (but was still part of Kiowa County at the time). Three people were killed about 6 mi (9.7 km) southwest of Snyder. As the tornado continued northeast it struck the city of Snyder at around 8:45 pm CST. The tornado struck Snyder beginning in the southwest corner of town and destroyed or damaged homes and other buildings west of Main Street and from 6th Street northward through the city. No buildings north of the railroad were left standing. After moving through Snyder, the tornado continued to the northeast, destroying a couple of small residences within two miles of the town site, then lifted about 3 mi (4.8 km) northeast of Snyder.
May 2, 1920	F4	71	100	Peggs
This violent tornado began 2 miles southwest of Peggs, moved northeast, and cut a 3 mi-long (4.8 km), 0.5 mi-wide (0.80 km) swath of devastation that included the entire town of 250 people. Around 8:30 pm CST, a loud roar was heard by residents just before the tornado hit Peggs at 8:35 pm CST. The town was almost completely destroyed, with only seven buildings remaining partially intact. Only a small, wood house, used as the city jail and located next to a smashed concrete store, was still standing. A cement block schoolhouse that was located west of Peggs had only partly standing walls after the tornado hit it. The tornado traveled at least as far as the Illinois River to the east of Peggs where a house was demolished. Wheat fields were scoured and trees were carried away by the storm, and scores of livestock were killed or injured. Eleven members of one family were killed by the tornado, and in one smashed house a total of 20 mud-covered bodies were recovered. A total of 71 persons were killed and another 100 were injured by the storm. Nearly 30% of the town's population was killed and another 40% were injured.
April 12, 1945	F5	69	353	Antlers
This violent tornado was part of an outbreak of devastating severe weather and flooding that occurred in Oklahoma on April 12–15, 1945, and was one of the 5 violent twisters that hit the state on April 12. The tornado touched down at 5:30 pm CST in about 5 miles southwest of Antlers near the Hall Community in Pushmataha County. The tornado moved to the northeast and struck Antlers, passing from the southwest corner of the town through the northeast portion. It produced a damage swath a half-mile wide through both business and residential areas, and devastated about a third of the town. Some areas were swept completely clean of all debris. The tornado then continued for another 20 mi (32 km)+, striking the One Creek area before dissipating near Nashoba, Oklahoma. The tornado killed 69 persons and injured 353 more people. A total of 379 homes and 254 buildings were destroyed, and 200 more homes and buildings were damaged. Approximately 1500 people were made homeless by the tornado. Damage estimates were at $1.5 million (1945 USD).
April 27, 1942	F4	52	350	Pryor Creek
This tornado touched down 5 mi (8.0 km) south of Claremore at about 3:15 pm CST, and moved storm east-northeast through rural parts of Rogers and Mayes Counties before taking aim on the town of Pryor Creek. At 3:45 pm CST, the tornado entered Pryor Creek and traveled directly through the main portion of the town, including the principal business section. Its violent winds demolished dozens of frame buildings and several brick buildings, including the First Baptist Church. After leaving Pryor Creek, the tornado caused damage to the northeast of the town, completely wrecking everything in its path before it lifted about 3 mi (4.8 km) northeast of Pryor Creek. The damage swath was a quarter of a mile in width, and about a third of Pryor Creek was destroyed by the tornado. A total of 49 people were killed in Pryor, with another three persons killed to the west-southwest of the town. A total of 350 people were injured with 192 of those being hospitalized. Damages totaled $2.3 million (1942 USD) and 500 buildings were damaged or destroyed.
May 3, 1999	F5	36	583	Bridge Creek, Newcastle, Moore, Del City, Midwest City
This violent, long-lived tornado was the most infamous of nearly 60 tornadoes that struck central Oklahoma during an unprecedented outbreak on the afternoon and evening of May 3, 1999. The tornado was the ninth of fourteen tornadoes produced by a supercell thunderstorm during the tornado outbreak. It formed around 5:26 pm CST about 2 mi (3.2 km) south-southwest of Amber, and grew rapidly as it headed northeast, paralleling Interstate 44. It moved across Bridge Creek and rural parts of northwest Newcastle, causing continuous F4 and sporadic F5 damage. The tornado was estimated to be a mile in diameter in this area. Total losses from this tornado include 36 direct fatalities (12 in Bridge Creek, one in Newcastle, nine in southern/southeastern Oklahoma City, five in Moore, six in Del City, and three in Midwest City), five indirect fatalities during or shortly after the tornado, 583 direct injuries, numerous indirect injuries, 1,800 homes destroyed, and 2,500 homes damaged. The tornado was also the 118th tornado to strike the Oklahoma City area since 1890. Total damage was estimated at $1 billion (1999 USD).
June 12, 1942	F4	35	100	Oklahoma City metropolitan area
This was the deadliest tornado to strike the Oklahoma City area until the May 3, 1999, F5 tornado. The funnel cut a twisting, erratic path through the southwest part of Oklahoma City. Movement was generally to the northeast, but it often "cut to the east or west". Thirty-five people were killed and 100 persons injured, with 29 people being hospitalized; an estimated total of 110 families were affected by the tornado. A total of 73 homes were destroyed and another 31 damaged, and many outbuildings were destroyed. Numerous automobiles and other vehicles were destroyed or damaged. Most of the damage occurred in the 27–29th Street areas between Portland and Goff Avenues. Damage estimates for this tornado were $500,000 (1942 USD).
April 25, 1893	F4	31	100	Moore
This massive tornado, reportedly over 1.25 mi (2.01 km) miles in width at one point, moved northeast along a 15 mi (24 km) path from northwest of Newcastle through rural areas between Norman and Moore (through what is now extreme northern Norman and extreme southern Moore), and swept away at least 30 homes. Thirty-three people were killed with 11 people dying in one home, six in a second home and four in a third home. This tornado was one of at least five strong to violent tornadoes occurring in central Oklahoma on this day. This was the second tornado to affect areas near Norman this day with the first one passing just south and east of Norman.
May 20, 2013	EF5	24	212	Moore
This violent tornado was first observed developing at 1:56 pm CST in McClain County around 1.5 mi (2.4 km) south of State Highway 37 in northwest Newcastle to the east of Rockwell Avenue. EF4 damage was observed soon after the tornado crossed State Highway 37. The tornado continued to expand in size as it approached the Canadian River and moved into Cleveland County. The center of the large tornado path passed near SW 149th Street and Western Avenue. After crossing Western Avenue, numerous buildings were destroyed and horses killed at Orr Family Farm. Two storage tanks estimated to weigh approximately 10 tons were lifted from Orr Family Farm and landed about 1.5 mi (2.4 km) mile east. Moving east, the tornado destroyed much of Briarwood Elementary School, where the National Weather Service storm survey team rated damage as EF5. Despite the destruction of this elementary school during school hours, no fatalities occurred at the school. After crossing Santa Fe Avenue, the tornado moved through more suburban neighborhoods and toward Plaza Towers Elementary School. Damage to the school was extensive and seven children were killed when a wall collapsed at the school. Nine other people were killed in eight different neighborhood homes within one-quarter-mile of Plaza Towers Elementary School, most occurring just south of the school. Overall, over 300 homes experienced EF4 to EF5 damage along the tornado path. Damages with this storm were estimated at $2 billion (2013 USD), and the tornado killed a total of 24 people.
November 19, 1930	F4	23	150	Bethany
This rare tornado is one of only three violent tornadoes to have been documented to have occurred during the month of November in Oklahoma since 1900. Between 9:30 am and 9:58 am CST, it moved north-northeast from 3 mi (4.8 km) west of the Oklahoma City limits and hit the eastern part of Bethany. About 110 homes and 700 other buildings, or about a fourth of the town, were damaged or destroyed. Near the end of the damage path, 3.5 mi (5.6 km) northeast of Wiley Post Airfield, the tornado hit the Camel Creek school. Buildings blew apart just as the students were falling to the floor and looking for shelter, and five students and a teacher were killed. A total of 23 people were killed and another 150 injured, with 77 being seriously injured. Damage estimates were listed at $500,000 (1930 USD).

== Costliest tornadoes ==
Ten costliest Oklahoma tornadoes
Date	F/EF#	Damages (in United States dollars)	Hardest-hit community
May 20, 2013	EF5	$2 billion (2013 USD)	Moore
May 3, 1999	F5	$1 billion (1999 USD)	Moore
May 8, 2003	F4	$370 million (2003 USD)	Moore
May 11, 1982	F3	$200 million (1982 USD)	Altus
May 7, 1995	F3	$100+ million (1995 USD)	Ardmore
October 9, 2001	F3	$100 million (2001 USD)	Cordell
April 19, 1981	F3	$75+ million (1981 USD)	Tulsa
May 3, 1999	F3	$60 million (1999 USD)	Stroud
April 24, 1993	F4	$50+ million (1993 USD)	Catoosa
March 15, 1982	F2	$30–40 million (1982 USD)	Bartlesville

== Intense tornadoes ==
=== Pre–1925 ===
FU	F0	F1	F2	F3	F4	F5	Total
1	0	3	128	66	40	1	239
Deaths: 583				Injuries: >2,475			

107 intense tornadoes hit Oklahoma prior to the year 1925. The majority of these tornadoes were deadly, with each tornado killing an average of 3.6 people. Tornadoes in this time-frame hit several populated places including Moore, Stillwater and Sulphur. The strongest tornado touched down on May 10, 1905, striking the community of Snyder and killing 97 people. The tornado was the first to receive a rating of F5 on the Fujita scale in Oklahoma's history.

† Deadliest in Oklahoma history at time of event
‡ Tornado crossed state lines in or out of Oklahoma

Intense (F3+) tornadoes in Oklahoma, pre–1925
F#	Date	Deaths	Injuries	Location	County	Path length	Max width
F3	May 8, 1882	3	13	Near Cherokee	Alfalfa	Unknown	
F3	May 8, 1882	21†	42	McAlester	Pittsburg	6.1 mi (9.8 km)	400 yd (370 m)
F3	December 16, 1887	6	50	N of Durant	Johnston, Bryan	25.7 mi (41.4 km)	Unknown
F3	June 8, 1889	0	3	E of Elgin	Osage	12.8 mi (20.6 km)	200 yd (180 m)
F4	May 12, 1892	5	25	NE of Olustee	Jackson	15.4 mi (24.8 km)	1000 yd (910 m)
F3	May 12, 1892	2	3	NE of Kingfisher	Kingfisher	12.3 mi (19.8 km)	500 yd (460 m)
F4	April 25, 1893	4	25	S of Stillwater	Logan, Payne	23.2 mi (37.3 km)	400 yd (370 m)
F4	April 25, 1893	31†	100	Moore	Cleveland	14.7 mi (23.7 km)	100 yd (91 m)
F4	April 25, 1893	1	11	SW of Marietta	Love	15 mi (24 km)‡	150 yd (140 m)
F4	April 28, 1893	6	20	S of Ponca City	Kay	15.4 mi (24.8 km)	400 yd (370 m)
F4	April 26, 1894	3	37	E of Oilton	Creek, Pawnee	22 mi (35 km)	880 yd (800 m)
F3	April 26, 1894	8	95	Morris	Okmulgee	22 mi (35 km)	1760 yd (1610 m)
F4	April 29, 1894	1	60	N of Westport	Creek, Pawnee	27 mi (43 km)	200 yd (180 m)
F3	October 31, 1894	0	0	Rural Woodward County	Woodward	20 mi (32 km)	250 yd (230 m)
F3	April 8, 1896	0	3	E of Norman	Cleveland	Unknown	100 yd (91 m)
F3	May 12, 1896	0	5	S of Stillwater	Logan, Payne	18.4 mi (29.6 km)	200 yd (180 m)
F3	May 20, 1896	0	0	E of Newkirk	Kay	15.6 mi (25.1 km)‡	100 yd (91 m)
F3	May 27, 1896	0	1	Marshall	Kingfisher, Logan, Garfield	10.5 mi (16.9 km)	Unknown
F3	October 28, 1896	3	0	W of Carney	Lincoln	8.3 mi (13.4 km)	70 yd (64 m)
F3	October 28, 1896	2	2	E of McAlester	Pittsburg	9.7 mi (15.6 km)	50 yd (46 m)
F4	March 30, 1897	14	40	Chandler	Lincoln	17.7 mi (28.5 km)	800 yd (730 m)
F3	June 2, 1897	2	8	S of Chelsea	Rogers	10 mi (16 km)	400 yd (370 m)
F3	May 15, 1903	0	10	Carnegie	Kiowa, Caddo	10.6 mi (17.1 km)	Unknown
F3	May 18, 1903	0	10	W of Oklahoma City	Canadian, Oklahoma, Logan	47.2 mi (76.0 km)	200 yd (180 m)
F4	May 23, 1903	3	10	NW of Burns Flat	Washita	15.5 mi (24.9 km)	400 yd (370 m)
F4	May 23, 1903	2	40	Camargo	Roger Mills, Dewey, Woodward, Major	65.3 mi (105.1 km)	600 yd (550 m)
F3	May 23, 1903	2	20	Carmen	Woods, Alfalfa	10 mi (16 km)	300 yd (270 m)
F3	April 24, 1904	3	20	E of Tulsa to W of Grove	Tulsa, Wagoner, Rogers, Mayes, Delaware	67.4 mi (108.5 km)	400 yd (370 m)
F4	April 24, 1904	5	35	Fairland	Delaware, Ottawa	14.9 mi (24.0 km)	400 yd (370 m)
F3	March 17, 1905	0	16	E of Carter	Beckham	Unknown	800 yd (730 m)
F5	May 10, 1905	97†	150	Snyder	Jackson, Tillman, Kiowa	40 mi (64 km)	800 yd (730 m)
F3	November 4, 1905	8	16	Mountain View	Kiowa	3.1 mi (5.0 km)	100 yd (91 m)
F3	June 4, 1906	2	5	N of Verden	Grady	6.2 mi (10.0 km)	Unknown
F3	June 4, 1906	0	1	W of Bridgeport	Caddo, Blaine	6.2 mi (10.0 km)	800 yd (730 m)
F3	June 22, 1907	1	7	NE of Owasso	Rogers	Unknown	
F4	May 10, 1908	5	40	SW of Arnett to W of Fairview	Ellis, Dewey, Woodward, Major	79.9 mi (128.6 km)‡	800 yd (730 m)
F4	May 26, 1908	7	8	N of Mooreland to S of Burlington	Woodward, Woods, Alfalfa	49.9 mi (80.3 km)	400 yd (370 m)
F3	May 28, 1908	0	3	SW of Cimarron City	Kingfisher, Logan, Oklahoma	10 mi (16 km)	250 yd (230 m)
F3	May 28, 1908	0	0	W of Lawton	Comanche, Stephens	8.4 mi (13.5 km)	200 yd (180 m)
F3	May 29, 1909	1	20	SE of Stroud	Lincoln, Creek	13.6 mi (21.9 km)	400 yd (370 m)
F4	May 29, 1909	6	20	N of Prague	Lincoln, Okfuskee, Creek	14.9 mi (24.0 km)	200 yd (180 m)
F3	May 29, 1909	0	8	E of Wetumka	Hughes	17.1 mi (27.5 km)	800 yd (730 m)
F3	May 6, 1910	1	4	SE of Coweta	Wagoner	4.8 mi (7.7 km)	200 yd (180 m)
F4	May 20, 1910	3	20	E of Elmore City	Garvin	12.2 mi (19.6 km)	400 yd (370 m)
F3	April 10, 1911	1	4	SE of Frederick	Tillman	Unknown	
F3	April 12, 1911	0	2	S of Chandler	Lincoln	8.9 mi (14.3 km)	Unknown
F3	April 12, 1911	1	3	NW of Okmulgee	Okmulgee	4.8 mi (7.7 km)	Unknown
F4	April 12, 1911	5	50	Barnsdall	Osage	12.2 mi (19.6 km)	300 yd (270 m)
F3	April 12, 1911	2	25	S of Checotah	McIntosh	14.9 mi (24.0 km)	400 yd (370 m)
F3	April 20, 1912	0	0	W of Addington	Jefferson	6.1 mi (9.8 km)	100 yd (91 m)
F3	April 20, 1912	0	0	S of Anadarko	Caddo	1 mi (1.6 km)	200 yd (180 m)
F3	April 20, 1912	0	3	SW to E of Oklahoma City	Grady, Canadian, Cleveland, Oklahoma, Lincoln	63.6 mi (102.4 km)	100 yd (91 m)
F3	April 20, 1912	0	0	NE of Edmond	Oklahoma, Logan, Lincoln	14.3 mi (23.0 km)	300 yd (270 m)
F3	April 20, 1912	0	14	Perry	Noble	10.9 mi (17.5 km)	Unknown
F4	April 20, 1912	1	1	E of El Reno	Canadian, Oklahoma	15.3 mi (24.6 km)	200 yd (180 m)
F4	April 20, 1912	2	6	S of Hennessey	Kingfisher	11.3 mi (18.2 km)	800 yd (730 m)
F4	April 20, 1912	3	12	N of Morrison	Noble, Osage	30.4 mi (48.9 km)	800 yd (730 m)
F4	May 27, 1912	7	30	SW of Skiatook	Pawnee, Tulsa	7.4 mi (11.9 km)	300 yd (270 m)
F3	June 15, 1912	1	15	Barnsdall	Osage	19.5 mi (31.4 km)	Unknown
F3	April 17, 1914	1	15	Chickasha	Grady	10.2 mi (16.4 km)	Unknown
F4	April 17, 1914	0	12	W of Braman	Grant, Kay	25.2 mi (40.6 km)	600 yd (550 m)
F4	October 9, 1914	6	14	S of Picher	Ottawa	16.4 mi (26.4 km)	200 yd (180 m)
F3	March 24, 1916	2	28	W of Ada		17.7 mi (28.5 km)	400 yd (370 m)
F4	March 24, 1916	8	5	W of Sulphur	Murray	16.6 mi (26.7 km)	400 yd (370 m)
F4	May 20, 1916	9	52	Kemp	Bryan	11.9 mi (19.2 km)	1200 yd (1100 m)
F3	January 4, 1917	16	20	SE of Crowder	Pittsburg	15.1 mi (24.3 km)	200 yd (180 m)
F3	April 18, 1917	0	15	Snyder	Kiowa	5.3 mi (8.5 km)	50 yd (46 m)
F4	May 31, 1917	3	20	NW of Marietta	Love	7.9 mi (12.7 km)	200 yd (180 m)
F3	June 1, 1917	5	5	E of Dougherty	Murray	3.2 mi (5.1 km)	50 yd (46 m)
F4	June 1, 1917	14	100	Coalgate	Coal	12.1 mi (19.5 km)	150 yd (140 m)
F3	June 1, 1917	0	12	N of Seminole	Seminole	7 mi (11 km)	200 yd (180 m)
F3	March 15, 1919	1	8	N of Colony	Washita, Custer	14.1 mi (22.7 km)	400 yd (370 m)
F3	March 15, 1919	2	25	S of Porter	Wagoner	7 mi (11 km)	75 yd (69 m)
F4	March 15, 1919	2	8	W of Bridgeport	Washita, Caddo, Blaine	18.2 mi (29.3 km)	1000 yd (910 m)
F4	March 15, 1919	4	18	N of Kingfisher	Canadian, Kingfisher	30.1 mi (48.4 km)	800 yd (730 m)
F3	April 8, 1919	9	35	E of Durant	Bryan	10.1 mi (16.3 km)	Unknown
F3	April 8, 1919	1	4	Stonewall	Coal, Pontotoc	20 mi (32 km)	200 yd (180 m)
F4	April 8, 1919	8	50	E of Kemp	Bryan	25.2 mi (40.6 km)‡	300 yd (270 m)
F3	October 8, 1919	3	15	W of Fort Towson	Choctaw	23.5 mi (37.8 km)	400 yd (370 m)
F3	April 17, 1920	0	8	SE of Bristow	Creek	6.1 mi (9.8 km)	1500 yd (1400 m)
F3	May 2, 1920	4	8	NE of Chelsea	Rogers	5.2 mi (8.4 km)	200 yd (180 m)
F4	May 2, 1920	71	100	Peggs	Cherokee	3.1 mi (5.0 km)	800 yd (730 m)
F4	May 2, 1920	0	4	S of Pryor Creek	Mayes	3.6 mi (5.8 km)	800 yd (730 m)
F3	April 14, 1921	0	0	W of Carnegie	Caddo, Washita	10.4 mi (16.7 km)	200 yd (180 m)
F3	March 13, 1922	3	40	Sulphur	Murray	4 mi (6.4 km)	150 yd (140 m)
F3	April 8, 1922	3	40	W of Lawton	Comanche	5.1 mi (8.2 km)	300 yd (270 m)
F3	May 7, 1922	1	10	Gould	Harmon, Jackson, Greer	26.3 mi (42.3 km)	200 yd (180 m)
F4	November 4, 1922	11	40	W of Tulsa	Creek, Tulsa	23.9 mi (38.5 km)	300 yd (270 m)
F3	May 21, 1923	0	8	W of Eagle City	Blaine	2.4 mi (3.9 km)	100 yd (91 m)
F4	May 22, 1923	2	9	W of Freedom	Harper, Woods	10.3 mi (16.6 km)	1500 yd (1400 m)
F3	May 22, 1923	0	4	N of Freedom	Woods	28.7 mi (46.2 km)‡	800 yd (730 m)
F4	March 28, 1924	8	80	SW of Norman to N of Prague	Cleveland, Pottawatomie, Lincoln, Okfuskee	52.6 mi (84.7 km)	300 yd (270 m)
F3	March 28, 1924	0	4	W of Davidson	Tillman	10.6 mi (17.1 km)‡	300 yd (270 m)
F4	May 28, 1924	7	30	Wetumka	Hughes, Okfuskee	25.5 mi (41.0 km)	200 yd (180 m)
F3	May 28, 1924	3	50	N of Keota	Haskell, LeFlore	22 mi (35 km)	200 yd (180 m)
F3	May 28, 1924	5	25	N of Tamaha	Muskogee, Haskell	41.9 mi (67.4 km)	150 yd (140 m)

=== 1925–1949 ===
FU	F0	F1	F2	F3	F4	F5	Total
2	0	2	188	76	37	4	309
Deaths: 612				Injuries: >4,543			

1925 through 1949 was a particularly devastating period in Oklahoma's tornado history, with 309 confirmed tornadoes killing over 600 people. The deadliest, a long-track F5 tornado, killed 181 people through Northwestern Oklahoma, where it directly impacted Woodward. 117 intense tornadoes hit Oklahoma in this time-frame, hitting several cities, including Moore, Norman, Leedey, Antlers and Pryor Creek. Caney would be hit by two F4 tornadoes in 1926 and 1948, respectively. The first tornado warning in United States history was issued for Tinker Air Force Base on March 25, 1948, shortly before an F3 tornado hit the base.

† Deadliest in Oklahoma history at time of event
‡ Tornado crossed state lines in or out of Oklahoma

Intense (F3+) tornadoes in Oklahoma, 1925–1949
F#	Date	Deaths	Injuries	Location	County	Path length	Max width
F3	February 21, 1925	1	5	Loco	Stephens	Unknown	
F3	April 26, 1925	2	4	S of Madill	Marshall	1.1 mi (1.8 km)	400 yd (370 m)
F4	April 23, 1926	4	15	S of Caney	Johnston, Atoka	19.9 mi (32.0 km)	600 yd (550 m)
F3	May 7, 1926	4	25	N of Panama	LeFlore	9.7 mi (15.6 km)	800 yd (730 m)
F4	May 7, 1926	2	23	NW of Okmulgee	Okfuskee, Okmulgee	30 mi (48 km)	500 yd (460 m)
F3	March 8, 1927	0	3	S of Tonkawa	Garfield, Grant, Kay	37.2 mi (59.9 km)	500 yd (460 m)
F3	April 11, 1927	1	6	NE of Carnegie to SW of Oklahoma City	Washita, Caddo, Grady, Canadian	55.3 mi (89.0 km)	300 yd (270 m)
F3	April 11, 1927	0	5	NE of Carnegie to S of Duncan	Washita, Comanche, Stephens	68.7 mi (110.6 km)	400 yd (370 m)
F3	April 12, 1927	2	18	W of Bokoshe	Haskell, LeFlore	10.5 mi (16.9 km)	300 yd (270 m)
F3	April 12, 1927	2	13	Fort Smith	LeFlore	3.9 mi (6.3 km)‡	150 yd (140 m)
F4	April 17, 1927	4	4	Bokoshe	LeFlore	6.6 mi (10.6 km)	800 yd (730 m)
F4	April 18, 1927	11	72	Fort Towson	Choctaw	19.9 mi (32.0 km)‡	800 yd (730 m)
F3	May 16, 1928	0	1	W of Mangum	Greer	Unknown	800 yd (730 m)
F4	June 8, 1928	2	6	NE of Boise City	Cimarron, Texas	45.2 mi (72.7 km)‡	600 yd (550 m)
F4	June 16, 1928	7	52	Blair to NW of Snyder	Greer, Jackson, Kiowa	29.8 mi (48.0 km)	1500 yd (1400 m)
F3	November 15, 1928	2	7	Orlando	Logan, Payne	1.8 mi (2.9 km)	200 yd (180 m)
F3	April 18, 1929	0	2	N of Gate	Beaver, Harper	8.3 mi (13.4 km)	1000 yd (910 m)
F4	April 19, 1929	3	35	S of Carnegie	Kiowa, Caddo	30.1 mi (48.4 km)	1000 yd (910 m)
F4	April 23, 1929	0	1	N of Buffalo	Harper	12.4 mi (20.0 km)‡	300 yd (270 m)
F4	May 5, 1930	1	16	SE of Hulen	Cotton	7.2 mi (11.6 km)	1000 yd (910 m)
F3	May 5, 1930	0	7	Empire City	Stephens	10.3 mi (16.6 km)	300 yd (270 m)
F4	May 5, 1930	2	9	SW of Alex	Grady	4 mi (6.4 km)	400 yd (370 m)
F3	May 5, 1930	3	18	E of Greenfield	Blaine	10.1 mi (16.3 km)	600 yd (550 m)
F3	November 19, 1930	0	4	S of Carrier	Garfield	5.2 mi (8.4 km)	250 yd (230 m)
F4	November 19, 1930	23	125	Western Oklahoma City	Oklahoma	7.1 mi (11.4 km)	150 yd (140 m)
F3	March 19, 1931	2	20	Clinton	Custer	1.5 mi (2.4 km)	200 yd (180 m)
F3	April 19, 1933	0	4	W of Faxon	Tillman	4 mi (6.4 km)	600 yd (550 m)
F4	April 19, 1933	3	25	W of Alex	Grady	15.4 mi (24.8 km)	1500 yd (1400 m)
F3	May 11, 1933	1	1	S of Snyder	Tillman, Comanche	14.6 mi (23.5 km)	1000 yd (910 m)
F3	May 12, 1933	5	11	Skiatook to Collinsville	Washington, Tulsa, Rogers	19.8 mi (31.9 km)	100 yd (91 m)
F4	May 22, 1933	4	150	E of Tyrone	Texas	9.4 mi (15.1 km)‡	600 yd (550 m)
F3	October 14, 1933	3	1	SE of Sayre	Beckham	0.9 mi (1.4 km)	100 yd (91 m)
F3	May 3, 1934	0	20	Wynnewood	Murray, Garvin	7.1 mi (11.4 km)	100 yd (91 m)
F4	May 4, 1934	3	11	Jenks to Catoosa	Tulsa, Wagoner	14.4 mi (23.2 km)	200 yd (180 m)
F3	May 4, 1934	0	5	E of Bartlesville	Washington	3.4 mi (5.5 km)	400 yd (370 m)
F4	May 4, 1934	1	17	S to NE of South Coffeyville	Nowata	15 mi (24 km)‡	800 yd (730 m)
F3	April 24, 1935	0	0	E of Blackwell	Kay	12.3 mi (19.8 km)	800 yd (730 m)
F3	May 8, 1935	0	4	SW of Medford	Grant	4.8 mi (7.7 km)	400 yd (370 m)
F3	June 2, 1935	0	0	W of Fairfax	Osage	Unknown	200 yd (180 m)
F4	June 2, 1935	0	12	Dilworth	Kay	35 mi (56 km)‡	800 yd (730 m)
F3	June 20, 1935	0	0	W of Shidler	Osage	2.2 mi (3.5 km)	800 yd (730 m)
F3	February 25, 1936	0	18	N of Tulsa	Washington, Tulsa	4.8 mi (7.7 km)	100 yd (91 m)
F3	May 1, 1936	3	13	Albert	Caddo	2.1 mi (3.4 km)	400 yd (370 m)
F4	May 8, 1936	2	38	Webbers Falls to Gore	Muskogee, Sequoyah	14.1 mi (22.7 km)	100 yd (91 m)
F3	May 8, 1936	1	30	Hanna	McIntosh	0.9 mi (1.4 km)	150 yd (140 m)
F3	June 5, 1936	1	5	W of Snyder	Tillman, Kiowa	5.5 mi (8.9 km)	75 yd (69 m)
F3	June 9, 1937	4	7	W of Moore	Canadian, Cleveland	19.1 mi (30.7 km)	300 yd (270 m)
F3	June 9, 1937	0	4	Maud	Pottawatomie, Seminole	9.6 mi (15.4 km)	400 yd (370 m)
F3	March 30, 1938	0	7	S to W of Bartlesville	Osage, Washington, Nowata	29.9 mi (48.1 km)	300 yd (270 m)
F4	March 30, 1938	10	200	NW of Welch	Craig	44.9 mi (72.3 km)‡	300 yd (270 m)
F3	May 1, 1938	0	1	NE of Buffalo	Harper	22.3 mi (35.9 km)‡	800 yd (730 m)
F5	April 13, 1939	7	33	S of Vici to NE of Alva	Dewey, Woodward, Major, Woods, Alfalfa	81.2 mi (130.7 km)‡	1000 yd (910 m)
F3	May 21, 1940	0	7	SW of Pocasset	Grady	4.8 mi (7.7 km)	200 yd (180 m)
F3	May 4, 1941	1	3	W of Brooksville	Pottawatomie	9.7 mi (15.6 km)	300 yd (270 m)
F3	March 15, 1942	0	0	Okarche	Canadian, Kingfisher	12.8 mi (20.6 km)	500 yd (460 m)
F4	April 27, 1942	4	12	Talala	Rogers	15.2 mi (24.5 km)	200 yd (180 m)
F4	April 27, 1942	52	350	Tiawah to Pryor Creek	Rogers, Mayes	19.8 mi (31.9 km)	400 yd (370 m)
F4	May 2, 1942	3	28	Pawhuska	Noble, Pawnee, Osage, Washington, Nowata	80.4 mi (129.4 km)	600 yd (550 m)
F4	May 2, 1942	7	20	Cushing to N of Tulsa	Payne, Creek, Tulsa, Osage	55.5 mi (89.3 km)	400 yd (370 m)
F4	May 2, 1942	16	80	W of Shawnee to Prague to W of Okmulgee	Pottawatomie, Lincoln, Okfuskee, Creek, Okmulgee	57.4 mi (92.4 km)	800 yd (730 m)
F3	May 31, 1942	0	0	Guymon	Texas	4.8 mi (7.7 km)	200 yd (180 m)
F4	June 12, 1942	35	100	W of Moore	Oklahoma	2.4 mi (3.9 km)	500 yd (460 m)
F3	April 11, 1943	1	12	NE of Poteau	LeFlore	1.3 mi (2.1 km)	80 yd (73 m)
F3	June 3, 1943	2	5	SW of Temple	Cotton	7.7 mi (12.4 km)	50 yd (46 m)
F3	January 26, 1944	0	2	NE of Fairmont	Garfield	Unknown	
F3	March 3, 1944	0	35	Hugo	Choctaw	14.9 mi (24.0 km)	100 yd (91 m)
F4	April 9, 1944	1	10	SE of Corn	Washita	14.5 mi (23.3 km)	400 yd (370 m)
F3	November 25, 1944	0	5	Collinsville	Tulsa	1.8 mi (2.9 km)	70 yd (64 m)
F3	March 16, 1945	1	6	W of Kemp	Bryan	7.6 mi (12.2 km)	Unknown
F3	April 12, 1945	3	15	Red Oak	Latimer	12.7 mi (20.4 km)	200 yd (180 m)
F4	April 12, 1945	13	200	E of Muskogee	Muskogee	3.1 mi (5.0 km)	400 yd (370 m)
F5	April 12, 1945	69	353	Antlers to S of Clayton	Pushmataha	27.9 mi (44.9 km)	880 yd (800 m)
F4	April 12, 1945	8	200	Moore to Nicoma Park	Oklahoma	20 mi (32 km)	400 yd (370 m)
F3	April 13, 1945	0	10	Farris	Atoka	3.5 mi (5.6 km)	400 yd (370 m)
F3	April 14, 1945	1	1	E of Newport	Carter	Unknown	100 yd (91 m)
F3	June 5, 1945	0	3	SW of Alva	Woods	13.1 mi (21.1 km)	400 yd (370 m)
F3	February 12, 1946	1	15	Ardmore	Carter	4.3 mi (6.9 km)	Unknown
F4	March 22, 1946	0	0	SE of Wynona	Osage	3 mi (4.8 km)	800 yd (730 m)
F3	May 10, 1946	1	5	NW to E of Eufaula	McIntosh, Pittsburg	10 mi (16 km)	Unknown
F3	October 17, 1946	0	0	SE of Hugo	Choctaw	7.5 mi (12.1 km)‡	200 yd (180 m)
F5	April 9, 1947	181† (Note: As of July 2025, this tornado is the deadliest in Oklahoma history.)	970	S of Shattuck to Woodward to NW of Capron	Ellis, Woodward, Woods	207.8 mi (334.4 km)‡	1500 yd (1400 m)
F3	May 11, 1947	0	5	Hitchcock	Blaine	15.9 mi (25.6 km)	200 yd (180 m)
F5	May 31, 1947	7	15	Leedey	Roger Mills, Dewey	18.1 mi (29.1 km)	800 yd (730 m)
F3	March 8, 1948	0	3	S of Sayre	Beckham	16 mi (26 km)	Unknown
F3	March 8, 1948	0	0	N of Purcell	McClain	6.2 mi (10.0 km)	Unknown
F3	May 1, 1948	4	175	NW of Grove	Rogers, Craig, Delaware	35.8 mi (57.6 km)	100 yd (91 m)
F3	May 1, 1948	0	15	Grove	Craig, Delaware	15.2 mi (24.5 km)	100 yd (91 m)
F4	May 3, 1948	0	3	NW of Dougherty to Caney	Murray, Johnston, Atoka	55.5 mi (89.3 km)	600 yd (550 m)
F3	March 25, 1949	2	25	NW of McAlester	Pittsburg	35.3 mi (56.8 km)	800 yd (730 m)
F4	March 29, 1949	4	31	Canton	Dewey, Blaine	19.6 mi (31.5 km)	Unknown
F3	March 29, 1949	0	7	N of Enid to Blackwell	Garfield, Grant, Kay	42.4 mi (68.2 km)	Unknown
F3	April 30, 1949	0	0	NE of Frederick	Tillman	6.2 mi (10.0 km)	Unknown
F3	April 30, 1949	0	0	S of Frederick	Tillman	Unknown	
F3	April 30, 1949	0	4	E of Lawton	Comanche, Grady	34.8 mi (56.0 km)	200 yd (180 m)
F3	April 30, 1949	0	1	W of Paoli	Garvin, McClain	17.1 mi (27.5 km)	150 yd (140 m)
F3	April 30, 1949	0	7	Bennington	Bryan	35.2 mi (56.6 km)	600 yd (550 m)
F3	April 30, 1949	1	8	W of Soper	Bryan, Choctaw, Pushmataha	29.6 mi (47.6 km)	400 yd (370 m)
F4	April 30, 1949	0	48	Norman	McClain, Cleveland	22.3 mi (35.9 km)	400 yd (370 m)
F3	April 30, 1949	3	8	SE of McLoud	Cleveland, Pottawatomie, Lincoln	23.8 mi (38.3 km)	250 yd (230 m)
F4	May 15, 1949	1	3	Texhoma to Goodwell	Texas	59.9 mi (96.4 km)‡	400 yd (370 m)
F3	May 17, 1949	0	0	E of Binger	Caddo	9 mi (14 km)	300 yd (270 m)
F4	May 20, 1949	1	7	S of Watonga	Blaine	15.3 mi (24.6 km)	400 yd (370 m)
F3	May 20, 1949	0	0	N of Waynoka	Woodward, Woods	30.4 mi (48.9 km)	100 yd (91 m)
F3	May 20, 1949	1	1	N of Shattuck	Ellis	Unknown	100 yd (91 m)
F3	May 20, 1949	0	1	Cleveland	Pawnee, Osage	4.8 mi (7.7 km)	Unknown
F3	October 9, 1949	0	3	SW to N of Laverne	Beaver, Harper	34.7 mi (55.8 km)	200 yd (180 m)

=== 1950–1974 ===
FU	F0	F1	F2	F3	F4	F5	Total
0	381	495	365	96	29	3	1369
Deaths: 251				Injuries: 2,315			

1950 through 1974 saw 128 intense tornadoes in Oklahoma, resulting in the deaths of 240 people. The deadliest touched down in Kay County before crossing state lines into Kansas, striking the town of Udall, Kansas and killing eighty. The tornado was one of two to receive an F5 rating on May 25, 1955; the other killed twenty people in Blackwell. The Oklahoma City metropolitan area was hit particularly hard, with intense tornadoes moving through the area in 1951, 1960, 1973 and 1974. The largest tornado outbreak took place on June 8, 1974, with 22 tornadoes killing a combined total of 22 people. Two F3-rated tornadoes moved through metropolitan Tulsa on June 8, crossing paths over Jenks.

‡ Tornado crossed state lines in or out of Oklahoma

Intense (F3+) tornadoes in Oklahoma, 1950–1974
F#	Date	Deaths	Injuries	Location	County	Path length	Max width
F3	April 30, 1951	0	0	Downtown Oklahoma City	Oklahoma	7.4 mi (11.9 km)	200 yd (180 m)
F3	June 8, 1951	0	0	Corn to Colony	Washita, Caddo	10.9 mi (17.5 km)	173 yd (158 m)
F3	March 13, 1953	2	11	NW of Marietta	Love, Carter, Marshall, Johnston	45.3 mi (72.9 km)	200 yd (180 m)
F3	March 13, 1953	1	8	E of Bradley	Grady	1 mi (1.6 km)	100 yd (91 m)
F3	June 5, 1953	0	0	SW of Sulphur	Garvin, Murray	16.9 mi (27.2 km)	10 yd (9.1 m)
F3	April 30, 1954	0	12	Hugo	Choctaw	1 mi (1.6 km)	150 yd (140 m)
F3	May 1, 1954	3	3	E of Grandfield	Tillman, Cotton	12.3 mi (19.8 km)	10 yd (9.1 m)
F3	May 1, 1954	0	0	W of Waurika	Cotton, Jefferson	8 mi (13 km)	300 yd (270 m)
F3	May 1, 1954	0	0	Marlow	Stephens	6.2 mi (10.0 km)	100 yd (91 m)
F4	May 1, 1954	0	2	W of Frederick	Tillman, Kiowa	68.6 mi (110.4 km)‡	440 yd (400 m)
F4	May 1, 1954	0	65	NE of Moore	Oklahoma, Pottawatomie, Lincoln, Creek	59.2 mi (95.3 km)	10 yd (9.1 m)
F3	April 18, 1955	0	0	SW of Cheyenne	Roger Mills	8.9 mi (14.3 km)‡	100 yd (91 m)
F3	May 25, 1955	0	1	Deer Creek	Grant	13.3 mi (21.4 km)	440 yd (400 m)
F4	May 25, 1955	2	18	SW of Cheyenne	Roger Mills	45.1 mi (72.6 km)‡	1100 yd (1000 m)
F5	May 25, 1955	20	280	Blackwell	Kay	28.4 mi (45.7 km)‡	500 yd (460 m)
F5	May 25, 1955	80 (Note: The majority of deaths occurred when the tornado struck Udall, Kansas.)	273	NW of Newkirk	Kay	56.4 mi (90.8 km)‡	1320 yd (1210 m)
F3	April 2, 1956	5	68	Stroud	Lincoln, Creek	42.6 mi (68.6 km)	300 yd (270 m)
F3	April 2, 1956	0	2	SW of Alva	Woods, Alfalfa	20 mi (32 km)	400 yd (370 m)
F3	April 2, 1956	0	3	SE of Sobol	Choctaw	2 mi (3.2 km)	100 yd (91 m)
F4	April 2, 1956	2	29	NW of Kaw City	Kay	108.3 mi (174.3 km)‡	880 yd (800 m)
F4	April 2, 1956	0	59	Miami	Ottawa	41.8 mi (67.3 km)‡	400 yd (370 m)
F3	April 8, 1956	0	4	SE of Enid	Garfield	7.3 mi (11.7 km)	400 yd (370 m)
F3	April 8, 1956	0	0	S of Covington	Garfield	7.7 mi (12.4 km)	400 yd (370 m)
F4	January 22, 1957	10	20	NW of Gans	Sequoyah	0.1 mi (0.16 km)	880 yd (800 m)
F4	April 2, 1957	2	6	E of Kingston	Marshall, Bryan	5.2 mi (8.4 km)	200 yd (180 m)
F4	April 2, 1957	3	3	Durant	Bryan	7.9 mi (12.7 km)	200 yd (180 m)
F3	April 22, 1957	0	1	Carnegie	Caddo	1 mi (1.6 km)	200 yd (180 m)
F3	May 20, 1957	0	1	Sallisaw	Haskell, Sequoyah	20.4 mi (32.8 km)	200 yd (180 m)
F4	May 24, 1957	4	5	S of Lawton	Cotton, Comanche	21.6 mi (34.8 km)	880 yd (800 m)
F4	September 14, 1957	2	6	Asher to Wetumka	Cleveland, Pottawatomie, Seminole, Hughes	67.5 mi (108.6 km)	440 yd (400 m)
F3	June 20, 1958	0	0	S of Gage	Ellis	0.5 mi (0.80 km)	67 yd (61 m)
F3	November 17, 1958	0	4	S of Frederick	Tillman, Cotton	65.8 mi (105.9 km)‡	50 yd (46 m)
F3	November 17, 1958	0	15	S to NE of Seminole	Seminole, Okfuskee	18.3 mi (29.5 km)	300 yd (270 m)
F3	November 17, 1958	0	0	Fairmont to Blackwell	Garfield, Noble, Kay	39.2 mi (63.1 km)	10 yd (9.1 m)
F3	March 31, 1959	0	3	NE of Oilton	Creek, Pawnee	3.8 mi (6.1 km)	100 yd (91 m)
F3	March 31, 1959	0	10	S of Kingston	Marshall	13.2 mi (21.2 km)	600 yd (550 m)
F4	May 9, 1959	7	12	W of Stonewall	Pontotoc	6.2 mi (10.0 km)	900 yd (820 m)
F3	May 9, 1959	0	0	SW to NE of Talala	Washington, Rogers, Nowata	23.4 mi (37.7 km)	50 yd (46 m)
F3	May 9, 1959	0	3	Ketchum	Mayes, Craig, Delaware	23.2 mi (37.3 km)	880 yd (800 m)
F3	May 26, 1959	0	8	Graham	Carter	3.3 mi (5.3 km)	60 yd (55 m)
F3	August 30, 1959	0	1	Devol	Cotton	2 mi (3.2 km)	100 yd (91 m)
F4	September 27, 1959	1	1	NW of Welch	Craig	8.2 mi (13.2 km)‡	440 yd (400 m)
F3	April 28, 1960	0	0	S of Binger	Caddo	3.3 mi (5.3 km)	100 yd (91 m)
F3	April 28, 1960	0	2	NW of Amber	Grady	3.6 mi (5.8 km)	200 yd (180 m)
F3	April 28, 1960	0	1	NW of Tuttle	Grady	1.5 mi (2.4 km)	200 yd (180 m)
F3	April 28, 1960	0	57	Downtown Oklahoma City	Oklahoma	11.7 mi (18.8 km)	333 yd (304 m)
F4	May 4, 1960	0	3	E of Antlers	Pushmataha	30.8 mi (49.6 km)	150 yd (140 m)
F3	May 4, 1960	0	0	NE of Marlow	Stephens	0.1 mi (0.16 km)	10 yd (9.1 m)
F3	May 4, 1960	0	6	NW of Ada	Pontotoc, Seminole	18.3 mi (29.5 km)	10 yd (9.1 m)
F3	May 4, 1960	0	4	Bethany to The Village	Oklahoma	5.1 mi (8.2 km)	400 yd (370 m)
F4	May 4, 1960	0	0	E of Asher	Pottawatomie, Seminole	8 mi (13 km)	10 yd (9.1 m)
F3	May 5, 1960	0	0	NE of Wayne to W of Sand Springs	Cleveland, Pottawatomie, Lincoln, Creek, Tulsa	101.9 mi (164.0 km)	400 yd (370 m)
F4	May 5, 1960	16	106	Wilburton to Keota	Pushmataha, Haskell, Sequoyah	62.4 mi (100.4 km)	200 yd (180 m)
F5	May 5, 1960	5	81	Tecumseh to Sapulpa	Pottawatomie, Lincoln, Creek, Tulsa	71.8 mi (115.6 km)	800 yd (730 m)
F4	May 5, 1960	5	13	Roland	Sequoyah	5.4 mi (8.7 km)	10 yd (9.1 m)
F3	May 5, 1960	1	0	W of Gans	LeFlore, Sequoyah	23.7 mi (38.1 km)	10 yd (9.1 m)
F3	May 5, 1960	1	0	E of Roland	Sequoyah	4.5 mi (7.2 km)‡	10 yd (9.1 m)
F3	May 5, 1960	0	0	Maysville	Garvin	7.3 mi (11.7 km)	200 yd (180 m)
F3	May 5, 1960	2	15	SW of Hoffman	Okmulgee	0.8 mi (1.3 km)	150 yd (140 m)
F3	June 7, 1960	0	0	S of Olustee	Jackson	0.8 mi (1.3 km)	100 yd (91 m)
F3	August 7, 1960	0	0	Quapaw	Ottawa	4.7 mi (7.6 km)	200 yd (180 m)
F3	February 17, 1961	0	7	Spencer to Luther	Oklahoma	16.8 mi (27.0 km)	300 yd (270 m)
F3	February 17, 1961	0	11	Stratford to Henryetta	Garvin, Pontotoc, Seminole, Hughes, Okfuskee, Okmulgee	73 mi (117 km)	300 yd (270 m)
F3	March 26, 1961	0	0	E of Kaw City	Kay, Osage	8 mi (13 km)	100 yd (91 m)
F3	March 26, 1961	0	1	W to NE of Eufaula	McIntosh	21.4 mi (34.4 km)	200 yd (180 m)
F3	April 30, 1961	0	2	N of Minco	Grady	2 mi (3.2 km)	77 yd (70 m)
F3	May 4, 1961	1	0	NW of Calumet	Blaine, Canadian	9.5 mi (15.3 km)	10 yd (9.1 m)
F4	May 5, 1961	16	58	E of Talihina	LeFlore	26.4 mi (42.5 km)	400 yd (370 m)
F3	May 5, 1961	0	0	NE of Hugo	Choctaw	0.1 mi (0.16 km)	10 yd (9.1 m)
F3	May 7, 1961	0	1	Bluejacket	Craig, Ottawa	8.9 mi (14.3 km)	400 yd (370 m)
F3	May 21, 1961	0	0	S of Cushing	Payne	0.1 mi (0.16 km)	10 yd (9.1 m)
F3	May 21, 1961	0	0	SE of Cushing	Payne	0.1 mi (0.16 km)	10 yd (9.1 m)
F3	April 26, 1962	0	0	N of Sayre	Beckham	3.6 mi (5.8 km)	300 yd (270 m)
F3	May 25, 1962	0	4	Weatherford	Custer	1.5 mi (2.4 km)	10 yd (9.1 m)
F4	May 25, 1962	0	9	Dill City	Washita	7.2 mi (11.6 km)	250 yd (230 m)
F4	May 26, 1962	0	1	E of Randlett	Cotton	10.1 mi (16.3 km)	400 yd (370 m)
F3	May 26, 1963	0	5	SE of Midwest City	Oklahoma	0.1 mi (0.16 km)	10 yd (9.1 m)
F3	May 26, 1963	1	4	Arcadia to N of Meeker	Oklahoma, Lincoln	34.3 mi (55.2 km)	10 yd (9.1 m)
F3	May 26, 1963	0	2	Bowlegs	Seminole	0.1 mi (0.16 km)	10 yd (9.1 m)
F3	July 15, 1963	0	0	SW of Beaver	Beaver	0.1 mi (0.16 km)	10 yd (9.1 m)
F3	April 3, 1964	0	1	E of Kingston	Marshall, Bryan	16.7 mi (26.9 km)	200 yd (180 m)
F3	May 10, 1964	0	0	S of Tahlequah	Cherokee	2 mi (3.2 km)	440 yd (400 m)
F4	March 16, 1965	0	7	S of Nash to N of Braman	Grant, Kay	82.7 mi (133.1 km)‡	300 yd (270 m)
F3	April 11, 1966	0	6	W of Coweta	Wagoner, Tulsa	7.3 mi (11.7 km)	100 yd (91 m)
F3	April 27, 1966	0	0	N of Haywood	Pittsburg	8 mi (13 km)	400 yd (370 m)
F4	April 27, 1966	0	2	S of Wapanucka	Johnston, Atoka	10.2 mi (16.4 km)	300 yd (270 m)
F3	April 20, 1967	0	0	S of Anadarko	Caddo	1 mi (1.6 km)	200 yd (180 m)
F4	June 10, 1967	4	1	W of Butler	Roger Mills, Custer	8.7 mi (14.0 km)	300 yd (270 m)
F4	June 10, 1967	0	0	E of Watonga	Blaine	0.1 mi (0.16 km)	10 yd (9.1 m)
F3	June 10, 1967	0	1	W of Kingfisher	Kingfisher	16.7 mi (26.9 km)	10 yd (9.1 m)
F3	April 19, 1968	0	0	SW of Little	Seminole	6.6 mi (10.6 km)	150 yd (140 m)
F3	May 13, 1968	0	0	W to N of Konawa	Pontotoc, Pottawatomie, Seminole	11.6 mi (18.7 km)	100 yd (91 m)
F3	April 26, 1970	0	0	E of Ames	Major	1 mi (1.6 km)	10 yd (9.1 m)
F3	June 11, 1970	0	1	Northwestern Oklahoma City	Canadian, Oklahoma	13.2 mi (21.2 km)	100 yd (91 m)
F3	June 11, 1970	1	45	Stilwell	Adair	51.8 mi (83.4 km)‡	250 yd (230 m)
F4	October 5, 1970	4	84	Shawnee to Prague	Pottawatomie, Lincoln, Okfuskee	25 mi (40 km)	150 yd (140 m)
F3	October 8, 1970	0	4	E of Colcord	Delaware	6.9 mi (11.1 km)	200 yd (180 m)
F3	March 12, 1971	0	4	Colbert	Marshall, Bryan	41.6 mi (66.9 km)	250 yd (230 m)
F3	May 5, 1971	0	0	Haskell to SE of Hulbert	Muskogee, Wagoner, Cherokee	37 mi (60 km)	600 yd (550 m)
F3	June 7, 1971	0	0	SW of Thomas	Custer	1.5 mi (2.4 km)	50 yd (46 m)
F4	April 19, 1972	5	6	SE of Ratliff City	Carter, Murray, Garvin	28.2 mi (45.4 km)	10 yd (9.1 m)
F3	May 22, 1972	0	0	SW of Willow	Greer	9.5 mi (15.3 km)	100 yd (91 m)
F3	October 21, 1972	0	1	Idabel	McCurtain	1.5 mi (2.4 km)	33 yd (30 m)
F3	April 19, 1973	0	21	Ada	Pontotoc	7.9 mi (12.7 km)	100 yd (91 m)
F4	May 24, 1973	2	4	Union City	Canadian, Grady	13.3 mi (21.4 km)	300 yd (270 m)
F4	May 26, 1973	5	25	N of Warner	Muskogee	3.6 mi (5.8 km)	500 yd (460 m)
F3	May 26, 1973	0	6	NE of Webbers Falls	Sequoyah	18.7 mi (30.1 km)	250 yd (230 m)
F3	May 26, 1973	0	3	N of Copan	Washington	0.3 mi (0.48 km)	100 yd (91 m)
F3	June 18, 1973	0	29	Frederick	Tillman	3.3 mi (5.3 km)	50 yd (46 m)
F3	June 18, 1973	0	0	N of Carnegie	Caddo, Washita	16.8 mi (27.0 km)	133 yd (122 m)
F3	June 18, 1973	0	0	E of Hominy	Osage	2.5 mi (4.0 km)	40 yd (37 m)
F3	September 24, 1973	0	14	N of Afton	Craig, Ottawa	20.8 mi (33.5 km)	100 yd (91 m)
F3	November 19, 1973	5	36	Moore	McClain, Cleveland, Oklahoma	24.2 mi (38.9 km)	500 yd (460 m)
F3	April 20, 1974	0	3	N of Moore	Grady, Canadian, Cleveland, Oklahoma, Lincoln	63.6 mi (102.4 km)	100 yd (91 m)
F3	April 20, 1974	0	0	N of Waurika	Jefferson	6.1 mi (9.8 km)	100 yd (91 m)
F3	June 8, 1974	0	14	Downtown Oklahoma City	Oklahoma	8.9 mi (14.3 km)	250 yd (230 m)
F3	June 8, 1974	0	0	Choctaw	Oklahoma	9 mi (14 km)	127 yd (116 m)
F3	June 8, 1974	0	0	N of Jones	Oklahoma	10.2 mi (16.4 km)	600 yd (550 m)
F3	June 8, 1974	0	8	Davenport	Lincoln	6.8 mi (10.9 km)	1300 yd (1200 m)
F3	June 8, 1974	0	0	E of Sparks	Lincoln	2.5 mi (4.0 km)	350 yd (320 m)
F3	June 8, 1974	0	0	E of Prague	Seminole, Pottawatomie, Okfuskee, Creek	29.9 mi (48.1 km)	1300 yd (1200 m)
F3	June 8, 1974	0	42	Jenks to Chouteau	Creek, Tulsa, Wagoner, Rogers, Mayes	48.9 mi (78.7 km)	100 yd (91 m)
F3	June 8, 1974	2	80	Jenks to Vinita	Tulsa, Rogers, Mayes, Craig	63.6 mi (102.4 km)	100 yd (91 m)
F3	June 8, 1974	0	0	SW of Jay	Delaware	2.7 mi (4.3 km)	150 yd (140 m)
F4	June 8, 1974	14	150	Drumright to Westport	Payne, Creek, Pawnee, Osage	29 mi (47 km)	400 yd (370 m)

=== 1975–1999 ===
FU	F0	F1	F2	F3	F4	F5	Total
0	650	396	234	73	19	3	239
Deaths: 150				Injuries: >3,821			

1975 through 1999 saw 293 tornadoes, which collectively resulted in the deaths of over 150 people. The deadliest in Oklahoma moved through Bridge Creek, Newcastle, Moore and Del City on May 3, 1999; the tornado, which received an F5 rating, had the highest measured windspeeds ever recorded on Earth, at 321 miles per hour (517 km/h). The tornado inflicted an estimated total of $1 billion (1999 USD) in damage to the Oklahoma City metropolitan area, making it the second-costliest in Oklahoma history. An F4 tornado that had killed 42 people in Wichita Falls, Texas on April 10, 1979, moved into Jefferson County, but caused no deaths along the Oklahoma portion of its path. Three F5 tornadoes hit Oklahoma during this time period, striking in 1976, 1982 and 1999. One of these tornadoes moved south of Spiro, killing two people. Another, which crossed Choctaw and McCurtain counties, injured 29 people near Broken Bow.

‡ Tornado crossed state lines in or out of Oklahoma

Intense (F3+) tornadoes in Oklahoma, 1975–1999
F#	Date	Deaths	Injuries	Location	County	Path length	Max width
F3	May 2, 1975	0	0	E of Dill City	Washita	4.7 mi (7.6 km)	150 yd (140 m)
F3	June 13, 1975	0	8	Stillwater	Payne	5.1 mi (8.2 km)	440 yd (400 m)
F3	December 5, 1975	0	38	Downtown Tulsa	Tulsa	1.5 mi (2.4 km)	700 yd (640 m)
F3	December 5, 1975	0	0	W of Haskell	Okmulgee, Muskogee, Wagoner	27 mi (43 km)	50 yd (46 m)
F4	March 26, 1976	1	4	N of Talihina	Latimer, LeFlore	10.7 mi (17.2 km)	440 yd (400 m)
F5	March 26, 1976	2	64	S of Spiro	LeFlore	11.9 mi (19.2 km)	440 yd (400 m)
F4	April 16, 1976	0	6	E of Fort Cobb	Caddo	32.9 mi (52.9 km)	440 yd (400 m)
F3	April 19, 1976	0	2	W of Leon	Jefferson	10.4 mi (16.7 km)	373 yd (341 m)
F3	March 2, 1977	0	1	E of Duncan	Stephens	4.3 mi (6.9 km)‡	200 yd (180 m)
F3	May 15, 1977	1	2	E of Duncan	Stephens	0.8 mi (1.3 km)	180 yd (160 m)
F3	May 16, 1977	0	0	NW of Sayre	Beckham, Roger Mills	18.2 mi (29.3 km)	1320 yd (1210 m)
F3	May 16, 1977	0	0	N of Erick	Beckham	6.5 mi (10.5 km)	800 yd (730 m)
F4	May 18, 1977	0	0	Keyes	Cimarron	38.6 mi (62.1 km)	440 yd (400 m)
F3	May 20, 1977	0	3	E of Altus	Jackson, Kiowa	10.4 mi (16.7 km)	880 yd (800 m)
F3	May 20, 1977	0	0	SE of Tipton	Tillman	1.5 mi (2.4 km)	200 yd (180 m)
F3	May 20, 1977	0	0	NE of Arcadia	Oklahoma, Logan	9.9 mi (15.9 km)	400 yd (370 m)
F3	April 30, 1978	0	0	SE of Slapout	Beaver	14.4 mi (23.2 km)	100 yd (91 m)
F4	April 30, 1978	0	0	S to W of Piedmont	Canadian, Oklahoma	9.3 mi (15.0 km)	1760 yd (1610 m)
F3	March 18, 1979	0	0	Copan to Wann	Washington, Nowata	7.9 mi (12.7 km)	30 yd (27 m)
F3	April 10, 1979	3	100	Lawton	Comanche	4.5 mi (7.2 km)	170 yd (160 m)
F3	April 10, 1979	0	0	SE of Ratliff City	Jefferson, Stephens, Carter, Garvin	12.8 mi (20.6 km)	170 yd (160 m)
F4	April 10, 1979	11	68	S of Davidson	Tillman	39.7 mi (63.9 km)‡	880 yd (800 m)
F4	April 10, 1979	42 (Note: The majority of deaths occurred when the tornado impacted Wichita Falls, Texas.)	1,740	Waurika	Jefferson	47.3 mi (76.1 km)‡	1320 yd (1210 m)
F3	May 2, 1979	0	0	SW of Covington	Garfield	8.4 mi (13.5 km)	120 yd (110 m)
F4	May 2, 1979	1	25	N of Ringwood	Major, Garfield	20.6 mi (33.2 km)	880 yd (800 m)
F3	October 30, 1979	3	2	NW of Ardmore	Carter	8.4 mi (13.5 km)	530 yd (480 m)
F3	April 7, 1980	0	4	S of Afton	Mayes, Craig, Delaware	24.8 mi (39.9 km)	440 yd (400 m)
F3	April 7, 1980	0	9	W of Cameron	Le Flore	0.5 mi (0.80 km)	127 yd (116 m)
F3	April 19, 1981	0	0	W of Tahlequah	Cherokee	3 mi (4.8 km)	100 yd (91 m)
F3	April 19, 1981	0	7	Tulsa metropolitan area	Tulsa	4.9 mi (7.9 km)	200 yd (180 m)
F3	April 19, 1981	0	1	Tulsa metropolitan area	Tulsa	0.5 mi (0.80 km)	10 yd (9.1 m)
F3	April 19, 1981	5	49	S of Bixby	Tulsa	9.9 mi (15.9 km)	880 yd (800 m)
F3	May 17, 1981	0	6	Tecumseh	Pottawatomie	10.2 mi (16.4 km)	587 yd (537 m)
F3	May 17, 1981	0	0	Cromwell to Okemah	Seminole, Okfuskee	15.4 mi (24.8 km)	350 yd (320 m)
F4	May 17, 1981	0	2	W of Cromwell to SW of Okmulgee	Seminole, Okfuskee, Okmulgee	33.6 mi (54.1 km)	600 yd (550 m)
F3	May 22, 1981	0	12	Clinton	Custer	10.3 mi (16.6 km)	267 yd (244 m)
F4	May 22, 1981	0	0	N of Binger	Caddo, Canadian	16.7 mi (26.9 km)	1333 yd (1219 m)
F3	May 23, 1981	0	0	Durant	Bryan	9.7 mi (15.6 km)	100 yd (91 m)
F3	March 15, 1982	1	36	Ada	Pontotoc	6 mi (9.7 km)	60 yd (55 m)
F4	March 18, 1982	0	12	E of Hardesty to Beaver	Texas, Beaver	88 mi (142 km)‡	800 yd (730 m)
F5	April 2, 1982	0	29	Broken Bow	Choctaw, McCurtain	53 mi (85 km)	500 yd (460 m)
F3	April 2, 1982	0	0	N of Marietta	Love	0.5 mi (0.80 km)	30 yd (27 m)
F3	April 2, 1982	0	0	NE of Boswell	Choctaw	8 mi (13 km)	100 yd (91 m)
F3	April 2, 1982	1	4	S of Tom	McCurtain	52 mi (84 km)‡	233 yd (213 m)
F3	May 11, 1982	0	41	Altus	Jackson	4 mi (6.4 km)	350 yd (320 m)
F3	May 11, 1982	2	18	NE of Blair	Jackson, Greer	10 mi (16 km)	700 yd (640 m)
F3	May 11, 1982	0	0	E of Lone Wolf	Kiowa	7 mi (11 km)	100 yd (91 m)
F3	May 13, 1983	0	0	Kingfisher	Kingfisher	8.8 mi (14.2 km)	250 yd (230 m)
F3	November 22, 1983	0	3	Albion	Pushmataha	3 mi (4.8 km)	100 yd (91 m)
F3	November 22, 1983	0	0	NW of Westville	Adair	19 mi (31 km)‡	100 yd (91 m)
F3	April 26, 1984	8	95	SE of Okmulgee to Morris	Okmulgee	22 mi (35 km)	1760 yd (1610 m)
F4	April 26, 1984	3	37	E of Jennings	Creek, Pawnee	22 mi (35 km)	880 yd (800 m)
F4	April 29, 1984	1	60	E of Jennings	Creek, Pawnee, Osage	27 mi (43 km)	200 yd (180 m)
F3	October 31, 1984	0	0	N of Seiling	Woodward, Major	20 mi (32 km)	250 yd (230 m)
F3	May 8, 1986	0	15	Downtown Oklahoma City	Oklahoma	4 mi (6.4 km)	200 yd (180 m)
F3	March 22, 1987	0	0	NW of Shattuck	Ellis	30 mi (48 km)‡	440 yd (400 m)
F3	March 13, 1990	0	1	SE of Duncan	Stephens	22 mi (35 km)	200 yd (180 m)
F3	March 13, 1990	0	0	E of Wakita	Grant	19 mi (31 km)	200 yd (180 m)
F3	March 13, 1990	0	0	E of Wakita	Grant	22 mi (35 km)‡	200 yd (180 m)
F3	May 15, 1990	1	12	NW of Stillwater	Payne	7 mi (11 km)	440 yd (400 m)
F3	May 26, 1990	0	0	SE of Hinton	Caddo	3 mi (4.8 km)	200 yd (180 m)
F3	March 21, 1991	0	2	Ada	Pontotoc	11 mi (18 km)	350 yd (320 m)
F3	March 26, 1991	0	0	SE of Wakita	Grant, Kay	67 mi (108 km)‡	500 yd (460 m)
F3	April 12, 1991	0	0	SW of Pond Creek	Garfield, Grant	9 mi (14 km)	800 yd (730 m)
F3	April 12, 1991	0	0	Pond Creek	Grant	9.5 mi (15.3 km)	500 yd (460 m)
F4	April 26, 1991	0	6	NW of Fairfax	Garfield, Noble, Osage	66 mi (106 km)	1500 yd (1400 m)
F4	April 26, 1991	1	24	SE of Westport	Pawnee, Osage, Tulsa	32 mi (51 km)	1700 yd (1600 m)
F4	April 26, 1991	0	22	Oologah	Rogers	4 mi (6.4 km)	1300 yd (1200 m)
F3	April 26, 1991	0	0	E of Enid	Garfield	6 mi (9.7 km)	350 yd (320 m)
F3	May 15, 1991	0	3	Laverne	Harper	11.5 mi (18.5 km)	900 yd (820 m)
F3	May 26, 1991	0	0	Mooreland	Woodward	12.5 mi (20.1 km)	1000 yd (910 m)
F4	May 11, 1992	0	3	N of Kiowa	Pittsburg	10 mi (16 km)	400 yd (370 m)
F3	May 11, 1992	0	1	NE of Tupelo	Coal	12 mi (19 km)	150 yd (140 m)
F3	July 2, 1992	0	1	W of Oologah	Tulsa, Rogers	4 mi (6.4 km)	100 yd (91 m)
F4	April 24, 1993	7	100	W of Catoosa	Tulsa, Rogers	5.5 mi (8.9 km)	250 yd (230 m)
F3	April 24, 1993	0	30	S of Catoosa	Tulsa, Wagoner, Rogers	8 mi (13 km)	250 yd (230 m)
F3	May 5, 1993	0	0	SE of Guymon	Texas	12 mi (19 km)	500 yd (460 m)
F3	May 5, 1993	0	0	NW of Hooker	Texas	18.5 mi (29.8 km)‡	1200 yd (1100 m)
F3	June 8, 1993	0	0	N of Kildare	Kay	11.5 mi (18.5 km)	150 yd (140 m)
F3	May 7, 1995	3	6	NW of Marietta	Love, Carter	34.1 mi (54.9 km)	880 yd (800 m)
F3	May 26, 1997	0	1	W of Indianola	McIntosh, Pittsburg	5 mi (8.0 km)	440 yd (400 m)
F3	May 24, 1998	0	0	W of Lamont	Grant	5.3 mi (8.5 km)	1300 yd (1200 m)
F3	October 4, 1998	0	1	Prague	Seminole, Pottawatomie, Lincoln	10 mi (16 km)	880 yd (800 m)
F3	May 3, 1999	0	3	NE of Apache	Caddo	6.4 mi (10.3 km)	100 yd (91 m)
F3	May 3, 1999	0	4	W of Chickasha	Caddo, Grady	9.3 mi (15.0 km)	880 yd (800 m)
F3	May 3, 1999	0	0	N of El Reno	Canadian, Kingfisher	22 mi (35 km)	350 yd (320 m)
F3	May 3, 1999	0	4	W of Kingfisher	Kingfisher	21 mi (34 km)	Unknown
F3	May 3, 1999	0	13	E of Crescent	Logan	13 mi (21 km)	880 yd (800 m)
F4	May 3, 1999	1	11	Dover	Kingfisher	15 mi (24 km)	880 yd (800 m)
F5	May 3, 1999	36	583	S of Amber to Bridge Creek to Moore to Midwest City	Grady, Cleveland, Oklahoma	37.3 mi (60.0 km)	1430 yd (1310 m)
F4	May 3, 1999	2	26	Cimarron City to Mulhall	Logan, Payne, Noble	40 mi (64 km)	1760 yd (1610 m)
F3	May 3, 1999	0	13	Davenport to Stroud	Lincoln, Creek	16 mi (26 km)	450 yd (410 m)
F3	May 4, 1999	0	0	SE of Stilwell	Sequoyah, Adair	38.2 mi (61.5 km)‡	Unknown
F3	June 1, 1999	0	0	S of Checotah	McIntosh	4.5 mi (7.2 km)	350 yd (320 m)
F3	June 1, 1999	2	5	W of Hulbert	Cherokee	2 mi (3.2 km)	350 yd (320 m)

=== 2000–2006 ===
FU	F0	F1	F2	F3	F4	F5	Total
0	200	92	21	8	1	0	322
Deaths: 1				Injuries: 203			

The years 2000 through 2006 only saw nine intense tornadoes, none of which were fatal. These tornadoes caused a combined total of 154 injuries, the majority of which were sustained when an F4 tornado hit southwest Oklahoma City on May 8, 2003. One fatality was recorded when an F2 tornado moved rural Coal and Atoka counties west of Coalgate on April 10, 2001. The Fujita scale, which had been used by the National Weather Service during tornado damage surveys to rate tornado damage, was discontinued in February 2007, being replaced by the Enhanced Fujita scale.

Intense (F3+) tornadoes in Oklahoma, 2000–2006
F#	Date	Deaths	Injuries	Location	County	Path length	Max width
F3	October 9, 2001	0	0	NW of Elk City	Beckham, Washita, Custer	11.5 mi (18.5 km)	600 yd (550 m)
F3	October 9, 2001	0	9	Cordell	Washita	6 mi (9.7 km)	500 yd (460 m)
F3	October 9, 2001	0	1	N of Mountain View	Kiowa	13 mi (21 km)	440 yd (400 m)
F3	April 17, 2002	0	0	W of Seiling	Dewey, Woodward	8 mi (13 km)	600 yd (550 m)
F4	May 8, 2003	0	134	Moore	Cleveland, Oklahoma	17.3 mi (27.8 km)	700 yd (640 m)
F3	May 8, 2003	0	0	W of Bartlesville	Osage	45 mi (72 km)	880 yd (800 m)
F3	May 9, 2003	0	2	NE of Oklahoma City	Oklahoma	17.8 mi (28.6 km)	1320 yd (1210 m)
F3	May 29, 2004	0	0	N of Depew	Creek	7.5 mi (12.1 km)	700 yd (640 m)
F3	March 12, 2006	0	8	SW to NE of Kansas	Cherokee, Delaware	29 mi (47 km)	440 yd (400 m)

=== 2007–present ===
EFU	EF0	EF1	EF2	EF3	EF4	EF5	Total
126	507	440	106	30	13	2	1,220
Deaths: 110				Injuries: 1,515			

As of July 2025, a total of 1,220 tornadoes, 41 being intense, have killed over 99 people in Oklahoma since the implementation of the Enhanced Fujita Scale in 2007. The deadliest struck Moore on May 20, 2013, killing 24 people and injuring 212 others. Two EF5 tornadoes have been recorded within state boundaries since 2007, both of which hit areas around Oklahoma City. The widest tornado ever recorded, which reached a peak width of 4576 yd (4184 m) (2.6 miles), moved through rural farmland south of El Reno on May 31, 2013, killing eight people.

‡ Tornado crossed state lines in or out of Oklahoma

Intense (EF3+) tornadoes in Oklahoma, 2007–present
EF#	Date	Deaths	Injuries	Location	County	Path length	Max width
EF3	May 5, 2007	0	1	NE of Sweetwater	Beckham, Roger Mills	7.7 mi (12.4 km)	150 yd (140 m)
EF4	May 10, 2008	21	350	S of Picher	Craig, Ottawa	75.5 mi (121.5 km)‡	1760 yd (1610 m)
EF3	May 23, 2008	0	0	S of Selman	Harper	5 mi (8.0 km)	1100 yd (1000 m)
EF3	May 23, 2008	0	0	N of Freedom	Woods	11 mi (18 km)‡	980 yd (900 m)
EF4	February 10, 2009	8	46	W of Ardmore	Jefferson, Love, Carter	37 mi (60 km)‡	880 yd (800 m)
EF3	April 9, 2009	0	7	E of Eagletown	McCurtain	37.2 mi (59.9 km)‡	850 yd (780 m)
EF3	May 10, 2010	0	0	NW of Ardmore	Carter	4.9 mi (7.9 km)	400 yd (370 m)
EF3	May 10, 2010	0	28	Tecumseh	Pottawatomie, Seminole, Okfuskee	37.2 mi (59.9 km)	2200 yd (2000 m)
EF3	May 10, 2010	0	3	NW of Shawnee	Pottawatomie	6.5 mi (10.5 km)	880 yd (800 m)
EF4	May 10, 2010	1	32	E of Norman	Cleveland, Pottawatomie	22.2 mi (35.7 km)	880 yd (800 m)
EF4	May 10, 2010	2	49	SE of Moore	Cleveland, Oklahoma	24 mi (39 km)	2000 yd (1800 m)
EF3	May 10, 2010	0	3	N of Medford	Grant, Kay	47.7 mi (76.8 km)‡	1500 yd (1400 m)
EF3	April 14, 2011	2	40	SW to NE of Atoka	Atoka	17 mi (27 km)	1320 yd (1210 m)
EF3	May 22, 2011	0	4	S of Grove	Delaware	17.9 mi (28.8 km)	1550 yd (1420 m)
EF3	May 24, 2011	0	0	N of Lookeba	Caddo	8.6 mi (13.8 km)	800 yd (730 m)
EF4	May 24, 2011	1	48	S of Chickasha to Newcastle	Grady, Cleveland	33.3 mi (53.6 km)	880 yd (800 m)
EF5	May 24, 2011	9	181	N of El Reno	Canadian, Kingfisher, Logan	64.9 mi (104.4 km)	1760 yd (1610 m)
EF4	May 24, 2011	0	61	W of Washington	Grady, Cleveland	23.1 mi (37.2 km)	880 yd (800 m)
EF3	May 24, 2011	1	2	E of Seiling	Dewey, Blaine, Major	13.2 mi (21.2 km)	880 yd (800 m)
EF4	November 7, 2011	0	0	Tipton	Jackson, Tillman	17.4 mi (28.0 km)‡	500 yd (460 m)
EF3	April 14, 2012	6	29	Arnett to Woodward	Ellis, Woodward	34 mi (55 km)	400 yd (370 m)
EF3	May 19, 2013	0	4	S of Carney	Oklahoma, Lincoln	20.8 mi (33.5 km)	1200 yd (1100 m)
EF4	May 19, 2013	2	10	E of Norman	Cleveland, Pottawatomie	23 mi (37 km)	1500 yd (1400 m)
EF5	May 20, 2013	24	212	Moore	Grady, Cleveland	13.8 mi (22.2 km)	1900 yd (1700 m)
EF3	May 31, 2013	8	26	S of El Reno	Canadian	16.2 mi (26.1 km)	4576 yd (4184 m)
EF3	May 6, 2015	0	0	Bridge Creek	Grady	10.3 mi (16.6 km)	1500 yd (1400 m)
EF3	May 6, 2015	0	12	Valley Brook	Oklahoma	2 mi (3.2 km)	700 yd (640 m)
EF3	May 16, 2015	0	0	S of Snyder	Jackson, Tillman, Kiowa	40.4 mi (65.0 km)‡	1600 yd (1500 m)
EF3	May 25, 2015	1	1	NW of Bokchito	Bryan, Atoka	18.8 mi (30.3 km)	700 yd (640 m)
EF4	May 9, 2016	1	0	Katie	Garvin	8.9 mi (14.3 km)	400 yd (370 m)
EF3	May 9, 2016	0	0	N of Sulphur	Murray, Pontotoc	16.6 mi (26.7 km)	1500 yd (1400 m)
EF3	May 9, 2016	1	0	NW of Wapanucka	Johnston, Coal	9.1 mi (14.6 km)	700 yd (640 m)
EF3	May 9, 2016	0	2	S of Boswell	Bryan, Choctaw	13.8 mi (22.2 km)	3100 yd (2800 m)
EF3	April 30, 2019	2	16	SW to N of Bokchito	Bryan, Atoka	27.6 mi (44.4 km)	1400 yd (1300 m)
EF3	May 23, 2019	0	0	SW of Laverne	Beaver, Ellis, Harper	15.7 mi (25.3 km)‡	1500 yd (1400 m)
EF3	May 25, 2019	2	29	S of El Reno	Canadian	2.2 mi (3.5 km)	75 yd (69 m)
EF4	November 4, 2022	0	1	Sawyer	Choctaw	44.7 mi (71.9 km)‡	1700 yd (1600 m)
EF4	November 4, 2022	1	13	Idabel	McCurtain	60.9 mi (98.0 km)‡	1056 yd (966 m)
EF3	April 29, 2023	2	0	Cole	Cleveland	10.9 mi (17.5 km)	1200 yd (1100 m)
EF3	April 29, 2023	0	0	S of Pink	Pottawatomie	0.6 mi (0.97 km)	250 yd (230 m)
EF3	April 27, 2024	1	30	Sulphur	Murray, Pontotoc	9.9 mi (15.9 km)	440 yd (400 m)
EF3	April 27, 2024	2	4	W of Holdenville	Hughes, Okfuskee	27.9 mi (44.9 km)	1760 yd (1610 m)
EF4	April 27, 2024	1	6	Marietta to Baum	Love, Carter	26.8 mi (43.1 km)	900 yd (820 m)
EF4	May 6, 2024	2	33	Barnsdall	Osage, Washington	40.8 mi (65.7 km)	1700 yd (1600 m)
EF3	November 3, 2024	0	6	E of Oklahoma City	Cleveland, Oklahoma	2.4 mi (3.9 km)	300 yd (270 m)
EF3	November 3, 2024	0	0	S of Comanche	Stephens	22 mi (35 km)	500 yd (460 m)
EF3	November 3, 2024	0	5	Harrah	Oklahoma, Lincoln	25.1 mi (40.4 km)	1000 yd (910 m)
EF3	May 18, 2025	0	0	SE of Arnett	Ellis	6 mi (9.7 km)	50 yd (46 m)
EF3	May 19, 2025	0	1	E of Pittsburg	Pittsburg	16.01 mi (25.77 km)	2972 yd (2718 m)
EF3	March 6, 2026	2	2	NE Beggs to N of Winchester	Okmulgee	6.8 mi (10.9 km)	950 yd (870 m)
EF4	April 23, 2026	0	10	NW of Waukomis to SE of Enid	Garfield	10.37 mi (16.69 km)	500 yd (460 m)

== Tornadoes by county ==
Tornadoes in Oklahoma, by county (1950–2025)
County	F0/EF0	F1/EF1	F2/EF2	F3/EF3	F4/EF4	F5/EF5	Total (Note: Due to the existence of unrated (F?/EF?) and unknown (FU/EFU) tornadoes, the total numbers are inconsistent with the count of rated tornadoes.)	Ref.
Adair	5	22	9	3	0	0	40	
Alfalfa	21	15	12	1	0	0	52	
Atoka	14	21	13	3	1	0	53	
Beaver	43	15	10	2	1	0	76	
Beckham	37	21	5	5	0	0	74	
Blaine	19	21	8	2	1	0	52	
Bryan	7	12	12	5	1	0	39	
Caddo	59	33	26	8	2	0	131	
Canadian	45	39	19	5	3	1	113	
Carter	22	20	9	7	3	0	66	
Cherokee	9	28	7	4	0	0	49	
Choctaw	7	8	2	4	2	1	27	
Cimarron	29	8	4	0	1	0	56	
Cleveland	32	39	24	3	6	2	111	
Coal	10	8	7	2	0	0	31	
Comanche	29	22	10	1	1	0	68	
Cotton	20	10	4	4	2	0	43	
Craig	12	21	13	4	2	0	54	
Creek	24	28	10	7	4	1	76	
Custer	31	21	10	4	1	0	74	
Delaware	11	31	18	8	0	0	69	
Dewey	22	18	9	2	0	0	54	
Ellis	39	26	15	4	0	0	84	
Garfield	34	21	14	6	3	0	78	
Garvin	18	30	12	3	2	0	65	
Grady	22	37	19	7	2	1	96	
Grant	36	18	7	8	1	0	73	
Greer	22	10	7	2	0	0	46	
Harmon	12	14	4	0	0	0	37	
Harper	10	12	4	3	0	0	33	
Haskell	17	12	3	0	1	0	34	
Hughes	14	8	15	2	2	0	42	
Jackson	37	16	17	5	2	0	80	
Jefferson	18	12	4	3	2	0	43	
Johnston	11	16	7	2	1	0	45	
Kay	46	25	20	5	3	2	102	
Kingfisher	37	22	15	4	1	1	84	
Kiowa	46	27	10	5	2	0	95	
Latimer	10	12	8	0	1	0	33	
LeFlore	17	37	17	4	2	1	81	
Lincoln	29	36	17	9	2	1	95	
Logan	25	21	12	4	1	1	65	
Love	12	10	6	3	2	0	36	
Major	18	16	8	3	1	0	53	
Marshall	14	9	9	3	1	0	38	
Mayes	24	45	13	6	1	0	92	
McClain	31	32	14	2	2	2	85	
McCurtain	17	26	21	3	1	1	69	
McIntosh	23	20	15	2	0	0	61	
Murray	13	17	9	3	1	0	46	
Muskogee	23	23	12	2	1	0	66	
Noble	17	19	6	1	2	1	49	
Nowata	15	15	9	2	0	0	46	
Okfuskee	21	24	7	5	2	1	63	
Oklahoma	43	47	23	19	3	1	138	
Okmulgee	21	25	8	4	1	0	59	
Osage	49	35	18	3	5	0	116	
Ottawa	7	26	9	3	2	0	49	
Pawnee	16	7	4	0	3	0	30	
Payne	18	24	12	4	2	0	61	
Pittsburg	32	39	13	3	1	0	89	
Pontotoc	22	27	15	7	1	0	74	
Pottawatomie	26	22	23	8	6	1	93	
Pushmataha	11	22	13	2	1	0	49	
Roger Mills	19	17	16	2	1	0	57	
Rogers	14	39	18	6	2	0	81	
Seminole	16	21	19	9	3	0	68	
Sequoyah	18	25	8	5	3	0	45	
Stephens	21	23	14	8	0	0	75	
Texas	47	19	7	3	0	0	76	
Tillman	34	28	10	4	3	0	90	
Tulsa	34	31	21	8	2	0	101	
Wagoner	23	21	14	4	0	0	64	
Washington	10	17	8	2	1	0	39	
Washita	15	21	8	6	1	0	58	
Woods	20	22	12	2	0	0	58	
Woodward	40	16	3	4	0	0	65	
Total	1,792	1,703	893	311	113	19	5,058	(Note: Due to some tornadoes crossing county lines, some tornadoes are counted more than once.)

== Tornadoes by month ==
Tornadoes in Oklahoma, by month (1950–present)
	January	February	March	April	May	June	July	August	September	October	November	December
No. of tornadoes	30	64	287	926	1,830	539	122	97	125	197	155	38
Highest year	2023	2023	1991	2024	2019	1995	1956	1979	1992	2021	2024	2022
Max F/EF#	F4	EF4	F5	F5 (Note: F5 tornadoes touched down in April 1939, 1945, 1947 and 1982.)	EF5 (Note: F5 tornadoes touched down in May 1905, 1947, twice in 1955, 1960 and 1999. EF5 tornadoes touched down in May 2011 and 2013.)	F4 (Note: F4 tornadoes touched down in June 1917, twice in 1928, 1935 and 1942.)	EF4	EF4	F4 (Note: F4 tornadoes touched down in September 1957 and 1959.)	F4 (Note: F4 tornadoes touched down in October 1914 and 1970.)	EF4 (Note: EF4 tornadoes touched down in November 2011 and twice in 2022.)	EF3

== Longest span without a tornado ==
The longest timespan without a single tornado reported in Oklahoma was from May 17, 2003, to March 3, 2004, or 291 days. The run was ended on March 4, 2004, when an F0 tornado touched down near Muldrow.

Longet consecutive timespan without a tornado in Oklahoma
No. of days	Start date	End date
291	May 17, 2003	March 3, 2004
248	August 8, 2013	April 12, 2014
248	July 16, 1990	March 20, 1991
245	July 4, 2016	March 5, 2017
234	July 4, 1976	February 22, 1977
220	August 24, 1977	March 31, 1978
200	August 8, 1955	February 23, 1956
193	September 6, 1978	March 17, 1979
192	October 22, 2017	May 1, 2018
189	October 11, 1969	April 17, 1970

== See also ==
- List of tornadoes in Cleveland County, Oklahoma
- List of Ohio tornadoes
- List of Texas tornadoes
