= Hendrix, Oklahoma =

Town in Oklahoma, US

- Town
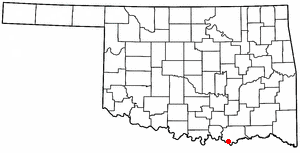
- Location of Hendrix, Oklahoma
- Coordinates: 33°46′31″N 96°24′26″W
- Country: United States
- State: Oklahoma
- County: Bryan

Area
  - Total: 0.12 sq mi (0.31 km^{2})
  - Land: 0.12 sq mi (0.31 km^{2})
  - Water: 0 sq mi (0.00 km^{2})
- Elevation: 587 ft (179 m)

Population (2020)
  - Total: 61
  - Density: 513.9/sq mi (198.42/km^{2})
- Time zone: UTC-6 (Central (CST))
  - Summer (DST): UTC-5 (CDT)
- ZIP code: 74741
- Area code: 580
- FIPS code: 40-33600
- GNIS feature ID: 2412744

Hendrix is a town in Bryan County, Oklahoma, United States. As of the 2020 census, Hendrix had a population of 61. According to the Bryan County Genealogy Society, Hendrix was originally known as Kemp City. This led to it often being confused with the neighboring town that is simply named Kemp. Hendrix was largely destroyed by a 1916 tornado.

== History ==
Hendrix was named for the owner of a general store named James A. Hendrix. originally called Kemp City when the Missouri, Oklahoma and Gulf Railway (MO&G) bypassed the town of Kemp in 1908 while building a line to Texas. In 1910, residents petitioned the Oklahoma Corporation Commission to force the MO&G to build a side track and stop station called Kemp City at present-day Hendrix. The commission ordered the railroad to satisfy the request, but the MO&G appealed to the Oklahoma Supreme Court, which upheld the commission in 1911.

== Geography ==
According to the United States Census Bureau, the town has a total area of 0.1 square miles (0.26 km^{2}), all land.

== Demographics ==
Historical population
Census	Pop.	Note	%±
1920	130		—
1930	84		−35.4%
1940	145		72.6%
1950	152		4.8%
1960	142		−6.6%
1970	117		−17.6%
1980	106		−9.4%
1990	108		1.9%
2000	79		−26.9%
2010	79		0.0%
2020	61		−22.8%
U.S. Decennial Census

=== 2020 census ===
As of the 2020 census, Hendrix had a population of 61. The median age was 42.8 years. 24.6% of residents were under the age of 18 and 24.6% of residents were 65 years of age or older. For every 100 females there were 134.6 males, and for every 100 females age 18 and over there were 155.6 males age 18 and over.

0.0% of residents lived in urban areas, while 100.0% lived in rural areas.

There were 32 households in Hendrix, of which 43.8% had children under the age of 18 living in them. Of all households, 28.1% were married-couple households, 34.4% were households with a male householder and no spouse or partner present, and 31.3% were households with a female householder and no spouse or partner present. About 34.4% of all households were made up of individuals and 15.7% had someone living alone who was 65 years of age or older.

There were 37 housing units, of which 13.5% were vacant. The homeowner vacancy rate was 0.0% and the rental vacancy rate was 0.0%.

Racial composition as of the 2020 census
Race	Number	Percent
White	43	70.5%
Black or African American	9	14.8%
American Indian and Alaska Native	3	4.9%
Asian	0	0.0%
Native Hawaiian and Other Pacific Islander	0	0.0%
Some other race	0	0.0%
Two or more races	6	9.8%
Hispanic or Latino (of any race)	1	1.6%

=== 2000 census ===
As of the census of 2000, there were 79 people, 32 households, and 24 families residing in the town. The population density was 650.2 inhabitants per square mile (251.0/km^{2}). There were 38 housing units at an average density of 312.7 per square mile (120.7/km^{2}). The racial makeup of the town was 65.82% White, 17.72% African American, 7.59% Native American, and 8.86% from two or more races.

There were 32 households, out of which 25.0% had children under the age of 18 living with them, 56.3% were married couples living together, 21.9% had a female householder with no husband present, and 21.9% were non-families. 21.9% of all households were made up of individuals, and 3.1% had someone living alone who was 65 years of age or older. The average household size was 2.47 and the average family size was 2.76.

In the town, the population was spread out, with 22.8% under the age of 18, 1.3% from 18 to 24, 30.4% from 25 to 44, 27.8% from 45 to 64, and 17.7% who were 65 years of age or older. The median age was 42 years. For every 100 females, there were 125.7 males. For every 100 females age 18 and over, there were 110.3 males.

The median income for a household in the town was $15,750, and the median income for a family was $16,563. Males had a median income of $21,250 versus $13,750 for females. The per capita income for the town was $9,378. There were 34.8% of families and 31.1% of the population living below the poverty line, including 36.4% of under eighteens and 15.4% of those over 64.
