= Kemp, Oklahoma =

Town in Oklahoma, US

- Town
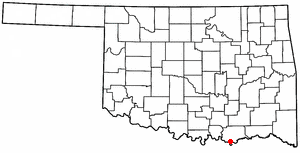
- Location of kemp, Oklahoma
- Coordinates: 33°46′10″N 96°21′16″W
- Country: United States
- State: Oklahoma
- County: Bryan

Area
  - Total: 0.18 sq mi (0.47 km^{2})
  - Land: 0.18 sq mi (0.47 km^{2})
  - Water: 0 sq mi (0.00 km^{2})
- Elevation: 637 ft (194 m)

Population (2020)
  - Total: 126
  - Density: 689.9/sq mi (266.38/km^{2})
- Time zone: UTC-6 (Central (CST))
  - Summer (DST): UTC-5 (CDT)
- ZIP code: 74747
- Area code: 580
- FIPS code: 40-39050
- GNIS feature ID: 2412822

Kemp is a town in Bryan County, Oklahoma, United States. As of the 2020 census, Kemp had a population of 126.

== Geography ==
According to the United States Census Bureau, the town has a total area of 0.2 square miles (0.52 km^{2}), all land.

== Demographics ==
Historical population
| Census | Pop. | Note | %± |
|---|---|---|---|
| 1900 | 221 | | — |
| 1910 | 336 | | 52.0% |
| 1920 | 396 | | 17.9% |
| 1930 | 186 | | −53.0% |
| 1940 | 204 | | 9.7% |
| 1950 | 158 | | −22.5% |
| 1960 | 153 | | −3.2% |
| 1970 | 153 | | 0.0% |
| 1980 | 178 | | 16.3% |
| 1990 | 138 | | −22.5% |
| 2000 | 144 | | 4.3% |
| 2010 | 133 | | −7.6% |
| 2020 | 126 | | −5.3% |
U.S. Decennial Census

=== 2020 census ===
As of the 2020 census, Kemp had a population of 126. The median age was 41.0 years. 17.5% of residents were under the age of 18 and 21.4% of residents were 65 years of age or older. For every 100 females there were 93.8 males, and for every 100 females age 18 and over there were 100.0 males age 18 and over.

0.0% of residents lived in urban areas, while 100.0% lived in rural areas.

There were 54 households in Kemp, of which 31.5% had children under the age of 18 living in them. Of all households, 46.3% were married-couple households, 24.1% were households with a male householder and no spouse or partner present, and 24.1% were households with a female householder and no spouse or partner present. About 29.6% of all households were made up of individuals and 11.1% had someone living alone who was 65 years of age or older.

There were 67 housing units, of which 19.4% were vacant. The homeowner vacancy rate was 12.0% and the rental vacancy rate was 0.0%.

Racial composition as of the 2020 census
| Race | Number | Percent |
|---|---|---|
| White | 82 | 65.1% |
| Black or African American | 0 | 0.0% |
| American Indian and Alaska Native | 29 | 23.0% |
| Asian | 0 | 0.0% |
| Native Hawaiian and Other Pacific Islander | 0 | 0.0% |
| Some other race | 2 | 1.6% |
| Two or more races | 13 | 10.3% |
| Hispanic or Latino (of any race) | 3 | 2.4% |

=== 2000 census ===
As of the census of 2000, there were 144 people, 65 households, and 44 families residing in the town. The population density was 788.6 inhabitants per square mile (304.5/km^{2}). There were 77 housing units at an average density of 421.7 per square mile (162.8/km^{2}). The racial makeup of the town was 74.31% White, 0.69% African American, 18.75% Native American, 1.39% from other races, and 4.86% from two or more races. Hispanic or Latino of any race were 3.47% of the population.

There were 65 households, out of which 32.3% had children under the age of 18 living with them, 49.2% were married couples living together, 15.4% had a female householder with no husband present, and 32.3% were non-families. 30.8% of all households were made up of individuals, and 13.8% had someone living alone who was 65 years of age or older. The average household size was 2.22 and the average family size was 2.64.

In the town, the population was spread out, with 24.3% under the age of 18, 4.2% from 18 to 24, 31.3% from 25 to 44, 20.1% from 45 to 64, and 20.1% who were 65 years of age or older. The median age was 40 years. For every 100 females, there were 94.6 males. For every 100 females age 18 and over, there were 98.2 males.

The median income for a household in the town was $30,000, and the median income for a family was $30,938. Males had a median income of $28,125 versus $15,250 for females. The per capita income for the town was $13,039. There were 31.9% of families and 27.3% of the population living below the poverty line, including 47.2% of under eighteens and 14.8% of those over 64.

== History ==
The incorporated town of Kemp, Oklahoma is located in the southern part of Bryan County, Oklahoma and was originally settled in the 1880s with the name of Warner Springs. The town was renamed Kemp, Indian Territory, in 1890 after prominent Chickasaw Legislator Jackson Kemp. The town is also in the southeast corner of Panola County of the Chickasaw Nation. It became part of Bryan County with the Statehood of Oklahoma in 1907.

The post office for the town of Kemp was established October 20, 1890. The town was surveyed and staked out August 8, 1901, and town lots were sold October 20, 1905. Board sidewalks lined Main Street of Kemp in the early years. The First Bank of Kemp, several grocery stores, a pharmacy, barber shops, livery stables, a hardware store, a blacksmith shop, a butcher shop, cafes, and even a hotel made the business district of the town. However, when the Missouri, Oklahoma and Gulf Railroad (later the Kansas, Oklahoma and Gulf) located three miles west of the town in 1912, many of the businesses including the bank located there in Kemp City, later renamed Hendrix, and the town of Kemp began its decline. The last store in the town closed in 1980.

Many girls of Chickasaw Indian descent from the area attended Bloomfield Academy, an Indian girls’ school located three miles northwest of Kemp operated by the Chickasaw Nation from 1852 until 1911. During the early years of Kemp, the other children would attend school in the one-room log school house called Warner Springs School, located just south of town. A larger frame school building was built around 1907. A brick building was later built that burned around 1940 and was replaced by a rock school building. The first Kemp High School graduating class was in 1932 and the last class to graduate was in 1968, when the school lost its accreditation during the mass consolidation efforts of the state in the late 1960s. The mascot for the school was the Kemp Tigers. Most students in the area now attend school at Achille, Oklahoma. The rock school building is owned by the town and serves the area as the Kemp Community Center. There are two active churches in the town: the Kemp Baptist Church and the Kemp Church of Christ. Most working adults are employed in either Durant, Oklahoma or in Sherman-Denison, Texas. Most adults seeking higher education attend Southeastern Oklahoma State University in Durant, or Grayson County College, in Denison, Texas.
