= USS Lloyd E. Acree =

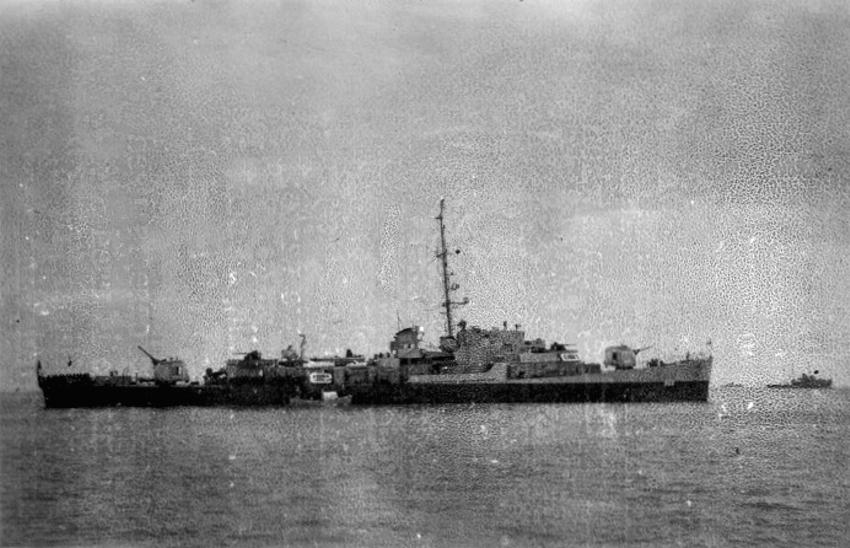
- USS Lloyd E. Acree (DE-356)

History

United States
- Name: Lloyd E. Acree
- Namesake: Lloyd Edgar Acree
- Builder: Consolidated Steel Corporation, Orange, Texas
- Laid down: 24 January 1944
- Launched: 21 March 1944
- Commissioned: 1 August 1944
- Decommissioned: 10 October 1946
- Stricken: 15 January 1972
- Fate: Sold for scrap 13 June 1973

General characteristics
- Class & type: John C. Butler-class destroyer escort
- Displacement: 1,350 long tons (1,372 t)
- Length: 306 ft (93 m)
- Beam: 36 ft 8 in (11.18 m)
- Draft: 9 ft 5 in (2.87 m)
- Propulsion: 2 boilers, 2 geared turbine engines, 12,000 shp (8,900 kW); 2 propellers
- Speed: 24 knots (44 km/h; 28 mph)
- Range: 6,000 nmi (11,000 km; 6,900 mi) at 12 kn (22 km/h; 14 mph)
- Complement: 14 officers, 201 enlisted
- Armament: 2 × single 5 in (127 mm) guns; 2 × twin 40 mm (1.6 in) AA guns; 10 × single 20 mm (0.79 in) AA guns; 1 × triple 21 in (533 mm) torpedo tubes; 8 × depth charge throwers; 1 × Hedgehog ASW mortar; 2 × depth charge racks

USS Lloyd E. Acree (DE-356) was a John C. Butler-class destroyer escort acquired by the United States Navy during World War II. The primary purpose of the destroyer escort was to escort and protect ships in convoy, in addition to other tasks as assigned, such as patrol or radar picket.

== Namesake ==
Lloyd Edgar Acree was born on 31 July 1920 in Beggs, Oklahoma. His family moved to Tulsa, Oklahoma, the year after he was born. He graduated from Central High School in 1939 and the following year, on 17 October 1940, he enlisted in the U.S. Navy at Dallas, Texas. He attended training at the Naval Training Station, San Diego, California, and was then assigned to the heavy cruiser USS Salt Lake City effective 10 December 1940. He received promotion to seaman second class on 17 February 1941 and then to seaman first class on 1 July of that same year. A few months later, on 1 August 1941, he promoted to his final rating of aviation ordnanceman third class.

On the night of 11 October 1942, Salt Lake City was operating as part of Task Group 64 when it encountered a large Imperial Japanese Navy cruiser-destroyer bombardment group off Cape Esperance, the northernmost point of Guadalcanal and a furious night battle ensued. In the midst of the engagement a Japanese shell burst close aboard the starboard side of Salt Lake City and sprayed the cruiser with shell fragments. Acree was loading a 5-inch shell into the No. 3 gun when shrapnel from the explosion tore into his arm and abdomen. He fell to the deck but despite his injuries, clung to the shell he had been holding in order to prevent it from exploding. Although quickly treated, he succumbed to his mortal wounds a short time later. He was posthumously awarded the Navy Cross.

== Construction and commissioning ==
The destroyer escort's keel was laid down by Consolidated Steel Corp. at their yard in Orange, Texas on 24 January 1944. The ship was launched on 21 March 1944, sponsored by Mrs. Ora A. Acree. Lloyd E. Arcee was commissioned on 1 August 1944.

== Operational history ==
After shakedown out of Bermuda and convoy operations, Lloyd E. Acree was assigned to CortDiv 82 and departed Norfolk, Virginia, for the South Pacific Ocean on 21 October. Steaming via the Panama Canal, the Societies, and the New Hebrides, she reached Hollandia, New Guinea on 28 November for duty with the U.S. 7th Fleet.

=== Invasion of the Philippines operations ===
Following antisubmarine warfare (ASW) training off New Guinea, Lloyd E. Acree sailed 13 December as escort for a 44-ship convoy bound for Leyte, Philippines. She arrived San Pedro Bay on 21 December and after an escort run to the Palaus and back, she returned to Hollandia as convoy escort on 13 January 1945. During the first three months of 1945, she continued to escort the vital troop and supply convoys which were important to the success of the Allied offensive in Luzon. The destroyer escort arrived at Mangarin Bay, Mindoro on 18 March and began ASW patrol duty in the South China Sea. During the next four months she cruised in search of enemy submarines from Mindoro to Subic Bay.

=== Rescuing downed flyers ===
While on patrol off Mindoro 8 April, she rescued survivors of a Liberator which had exploded en route to a bombing mission over Formosa. In addition she supported the training of U.S. 7th Fleet submarines off the Philippines.

=== End-of-war operations ===
Lloyd E. Acree resumed convoy escort duty in the closing weeks of the war. She departed Subic Bay on 12 July as escort for a convoy bound for Okinawa. She continued operating between the Philippines and the Ryūkyūs until 12 September when she began weather patrols off the Philippines. For more than five months she operated out of various Philippine ports from Manila, Luzon, to Guiuan, Samar while gathering important weather information in the Philippine Sea.

Departing Manila on 15 February 1946, Lloyd E. Acree steamed to the coast of China and arrived Qingdao 20 February. For almost 2 months she operated in the Yellow and East China Seas in ASW training and supporting Chinese Nationalists during their struggle with Chinese Communists.

=== Post-war decommissioning ===
On 15 April she departed Qingdao via the Marianas, Marshalls, and Pearl Harbor, and reached San Pedro, Los Angeles on 11 May. There she decommissioned on 10 October, was inactivated at San Diego, California, 20 November, and joined the Pacific Reserve Fleet. She was berthed at Mare Island, California, and struck on 15 January 1972. She was sold for scrap on 13 June 1973.
