= USS Acree =

Cannon-class destroyer escort

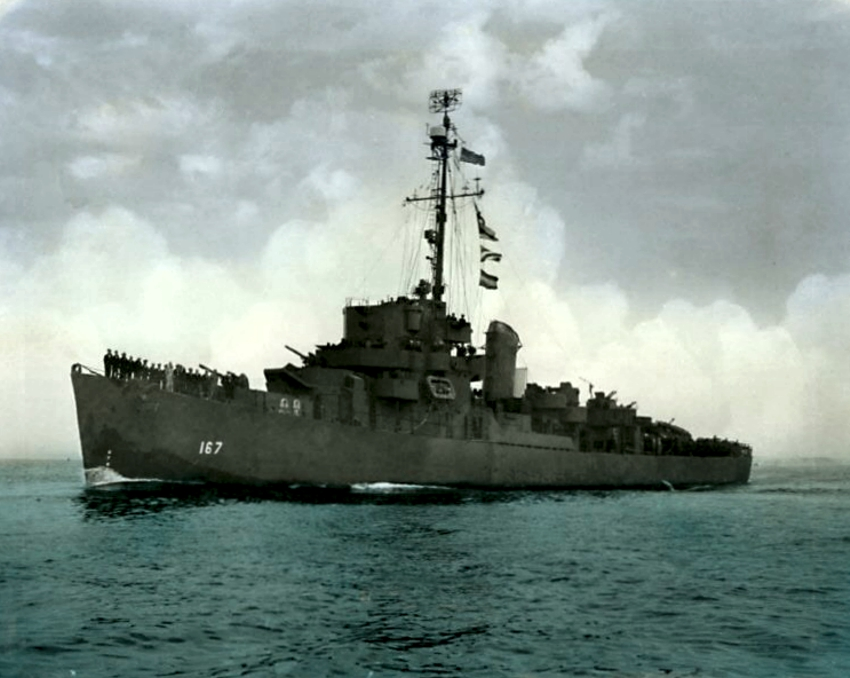

History

United States
- Name: Acree
- Namesake: John White Acree
- Builder: Federal Shipbuilding and Drydock Company, Kearny, New Jersey
- Laid down: 30 November 1942
- Launched: 9 May 1943
- Sponsored by: Mrs. John W. Acree
- Commissioned: 19 July 1943
- Decommissioned: 1 April 1946
- Stricken: 1 July 1972
- Identification: Hull symbol:DE-167; Code letters:NFDQ
- Honors and awards: 5 Battle Stars (World War II); American Campaign Medal; Asiatic-Pacific Campaign Medal; World War II Victory Medal
- Fate: Sold for scrapping, 19 July 1973, to Boston Metals Co., Baltimore, Maryland

General characteristics
- Class & type: Cannon-class destroyer escort
- Displacement: 1,240 long tons (1,260 t) (standard); 1,620 long tons (1,646 t) (full)
- Length: 306 ft (93 m) o/a; 300 ft (91 m) w/l
- Beam: 36 ft 10 in (11.23 m)
- Draft: 10 ft 6 in (3.20 m)
- Installed power: 4 × GM Mod. 16-278A diesel engines; 6,000 shp (4,500 kW)
- Propulsion: 2 × electric drives; 2 × screws
- Speed: 21 kn (39 km/h; 24 mph)
- Range: 10,800 nmi (20,000 km; 12,400 mi) at 12 kn (22 km/h; 14 mph)
- Complement: 15 officers and 201 enlisted
- Armament: 3 × 3 in (76 mm)/50 caliber Mk.22 guns; 1 × twin 40 mm (1.6 in) Mk.1 AA gun; 8 × 20 mm (0.79 in) Mk.4 AA cannons; 3 × 21 inch (533 mm) torpedo tubes; 1 × Hedgehog Mk.10 anti-submarine mortar (144 rounds); 8 × Mk.6 depth charge projectors; 2 × Mk.9 depth charge tracks

USS Acree (DE-167) was a Cannon-class destroyer escort in service the United States Navy from 1943 to 1946. She was scrapped in 1973.

== Construction ==
The Acree was named for John White Acree, a LTJG serving aboard the USS Enterprise. Acree died while leading a damage-control party on 26 October 1942 during the Battle of the Santa Cruz Islands. The ship was laid down on 30 November 1942 by the Federal Shipbuilding and Drydock Company, Kearny, New Jersey; launched on 9 May 1943; sponsored by Mrs. John W. Acree, the widow of LTJG Acree; and commissioned at the New York Navy Yard on 19 July 1943.

== Service history ==
After shakedown off Bermuda and training out of Norfolk, Virginia, the destroyer escort sailed for the South Pacific on 28 September, transited the Panama Canal on 5 October, stopped briefly at the Galapagos Islands three days later, and steamed on independently to Bora Bora in the Society Islands, where she arrived on the 18th. After refueling, Acree rendezvoused with SS Mormactern on 25 October and escorted her to Nouméa, New Caledonia.

As a member of Escort Division 11, Acree carried out numerous convoy and anti-submarine patrol operations in the South Pacific during the next six months. Her stops included Espiritu Santo in the New Hebrides; Lautoka, Fiji Islands; Guadalcanal; Nouméa, New Caledonia; and the Russell Islands. This routine was broken on 28 April 1944 when the ship joined the anti-submarine screen of Task Group (TG) 50.17, which was formed to refuel Vice Admiral Marc Mitscher's Fast Carrier Task Force, TF 58. She completed this assignment on 3 May, sailed back to Purvis Bay, and began antisubmarine patrol duty off that port.

On 9 June, Acree became a member of TG 53.19 slated to take part in the invasion of the Marianas. She arrived off the southern end of Tinian Island on 7 July and provided illuminating and harassing fire on Tinian Town. The destroyer escort opened fire at 1905 and continued firing at 40-minute intervals throughout the night. She moved to Saipan Harbor the next day and later joined the anti-submarine screen off Saipan.

For the next four months, Acree carried out escort and patrol duties in the central Pacific. On 13 November, Acree departed Eniwetok bound for the United States. She stopped at Pearl Harbor on the 21st and arrived at San Francisco on 3 December 1944 and, the following day entered the United Engineering Co., Ltd., shipyard at Alameda, California, for overhaul.

The destroyer escort got underway for sea trials on 31 January 1945; sailed for Hawaii on 4 February; and, following her arrival at Pearl Harbor on the 10th, participated in training exercises north of the Hawaiian Islands in company with the destroyer escort McConnell (DE-163) and escort carrier Sangamon. Acree returned to Eniwetok on 24 March and spent the remainder of the war escorting convoys and acting as a barrier patrol off Pacific islands such as Guam, Eniwetok, Ulithi, Saipan, and Kwajalein.

Following Japan's surrender, the ship got underway from Kwajalein on 15 September, bound for home. After a one-day stop at Pearl Harbor, she resumed her eastward voyage and reached San Diego, California, on 28 September. On 6 October, she sailed for the east coast and, after transiting the Panama Canal, arrived at New York on 20 October to begin a pre-inactivation availability. On 29 November, the destroyer escort arrived at Green Cove Springs, Florida, where she was decommissioned on 1 April 1946.

Acree was struck from the Naval Vessel Register on 1 July 1972 and sold on 19 July 1973 to the Boston Metals Co., of Baltimore, Maryland, for scrapping.
