= Bridgeport, Oklahoma =

Town in Oklahoma, US

- Town
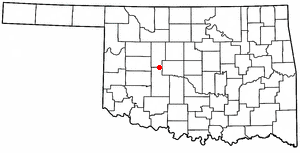
- Location of Bridgeport, Oklahoma
- Coordinates: 35°32′51″N 98°22′39″W
- Country: United States
- State: Oklahoma
- County: Caddo

Area
  - Total: 0.54 sq mi (1.39 km^{2})
  - Land: 0.54 sq mi (1.39 km^{2})
  - Water: 0 sq mi (0.00 km^{2})
- Elevation: 1,490 ft (450 m)

Population (2020)
  - Total: 97
  - Density: 180.7/sq mi (69.75/km^{2})
- Time zone: UTC-6 (Central (CST))
  - Summer (DST): UTC-5 (CDT)
- FIPS code: 40-08750
- GNIS feature ID: 2409906

Bridgeport is a town in Caddo County, Oklahoma, United States. The population was 116 at the 2010 census.

== History ==
Bridgeport was so named on account of there being a toll bridge over the Canadian River at that point.

== Geography ==
Bridgeport is located on the northern border of Caddo County. It is bordered to the north by Blaine County. The town is built on the south side of the valley of the Canadian River, overlooking its floodplain.

Former U.S. Route 66 is 0.5 miles (0.80 km) to the south of the town, and Interstate 40 runs one-half mile further south, though the closest access is 2 miles (3 km) to the east at Exit 101. Downtown Oklahoma City is 52 miles (84 km) east of Bridgeport.

According to the United States Census Bureau, the city has a total area of 0.54 square miles (1.4 km^{2}), all land.

== Demographics ==
Historical population
Census	Pop.	Note	%±
1910	428		—
1920	294		−31.3%
1930	432		46.9%
1940	302		−30.1%
1950	199		−34.1%
1960	139		−30.2%
1970	142		2.2%
1980	115		−19.0%
1990	137		19.1%
2000	109		−20.4%
2010	116		6.4%
2020	97		−16.4%
U.S. Decennial Census

=== 2020 census ===
As of the 2020 census, Bridgeport had a population of 97. The median age was 42.2 years. 16.5% of residents were under the age of 18 and 18.6% of residents were 65 years of age or older. For every 100 females there were 90.2 males, and for every 100 females age 18 and over there were 107.7 males age 18 and over.

<0.1% of residents lived in urban areas, while 100.0% lived in rural areas.

There were 48 households in Bridgeport, of which 37.5% had children under the age of 18 living in them. Of all households, 37.5% were married-couple households, 29.2% were households with a male householder and no spouse or partner present, and 27.1% were households with a female householder and no spouse or partner present. About 35.4% of all households were made up of individuals and 10.5% had someone living alone who was 65 years of age or older.

There were 48 housing units, of which <0.1% were vacant. Among occupied housing units, 87.5% were owner-occupied and 12.5% were renter-occupied. The homeowner vacancy rate was <0.1% and the rental vacancy rate was <0.1%.

Racial composition as of the 2020 census
Race	Percent
White	78.4%
Black or African American	<0.1%
American Indian and Alaska Native	8.2%
Asian	<0.1%
Native Hawaiian and Other Pacific Islander	<0.1%
Some other race	1.0%
Two or more races	12.4%
Hispanic or Latino (of any race)	8.2%

=== 2000 census ===
As of the 2000 census, there were 109 people, 42 households, and 30 families residing in the city. The population density was 203.7 inhabitants per square mile (78.6/km^{2}). There were 46 housing units at an average density of 85.9 per square mile (33.2/km^{2}). The racial makeup of the city was 89.91% White, 0.92% Native American, 1.83% Asian, and 7.34% from two or more races.

There were 42 households, out of which 28.6% had children under the age of 18 living with them, 47.6% were married couples living together, 14.3% had a female householder with no husband present, and 26.2% were non-families. 23.8% of all households were made up of individuals, and 9.5% had someone living alone who was 65 years of age or older. The average household size was 2.60 and the average family size was 3.10.

In the city, the population was spread out, with 24.8% under the age of 18, 6.4% from 18 to 24, 28.4% from 25 to 44, 22.9% from 45 to 64, and 17.4% who were 65 years of age or older. The median age was 38 years. For every 100 females, there were 94.6 males. For every 100 females age 18 and over, there were 105.0 males.

The median income for a household in the city was $18,906, and the median income for a family was $23,333. Males had a median income of $27,500 versus $11,250 for females. The per capita income for the city was $11,380. There were 16.7% of families and 19.4% of the population living below the poverty line, including no under eighteens and 21.6% of those over 64.

== Transportation ==
The town is just north of the old US Route 66, and further north from Interstate 40.

Bridgeport is served by Hinton Municipal Airport (FAA ID: 2O8), which is about 5 miles southeast and features a 4001 x 60 ft. (1220 x 18 m) paved runway.

Commercial air transportation is available at Will Rogers World Airport, about 58 miles to the east-southeast.

Bridgeport is on its own 9.6-mile branch of the AT&L Railroad that runs to Geary, Oklahoma, and on from there to El Reno, Oklahoma, with the AT&L then having overhead trackage rights on Union Pacific to Oklahoma City. Traffic includes grain, fertilizer and agriculture-related products.
