= Oklahoma State Highway 78 =

State highway in Oklahoma, United States

State Highway 78

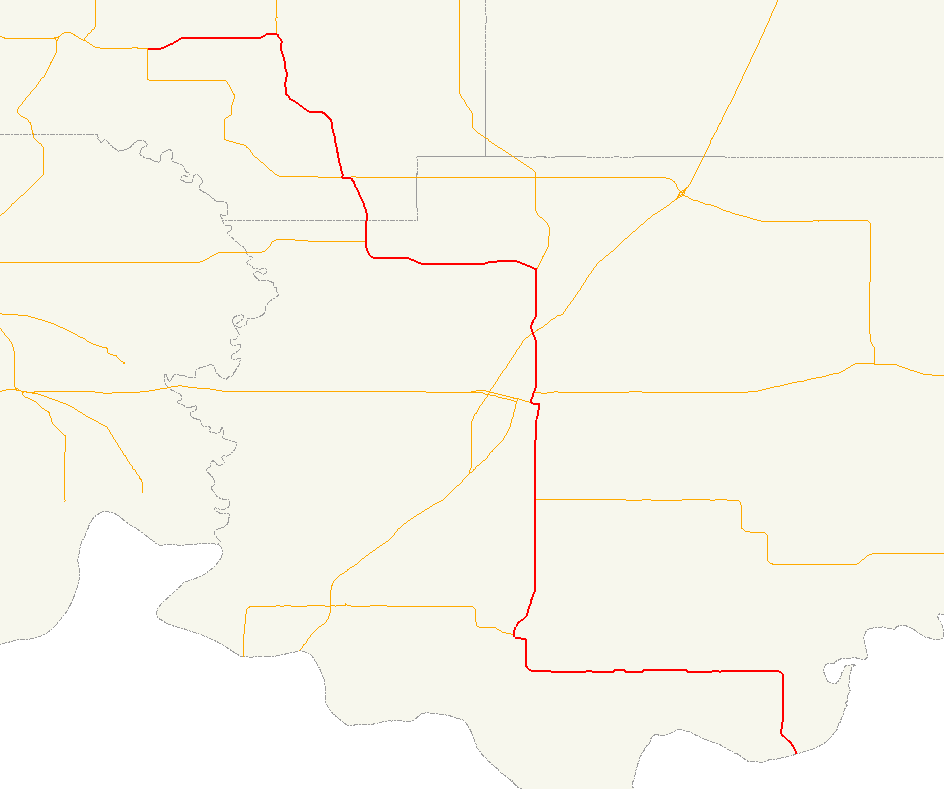

Route information
- Maintained by ODOT
- Length: 60 mi (97 km)

Major junctions
- South end: SH 78 at the Texas state line in Karma
- US 70 in Durant; US 69 / US 75 in Durant
- North end: US 377 / SH-22 / SH-99 in Tishomingo

Location
- Country: United States
- State: Oklahoma

Highway system
- Oklahoma State Highway System; Interstate; US; State; Turnpikes
← US 77	→ SH-79

State Highway 78 is a 60-mile (97 km) long (97 km) state highway in southern Oklahoma. It runs from the Red River (where it crosses into Texas as State Highway 78) to Tishomingo. It has no lettered spur routes.

== Route description ==
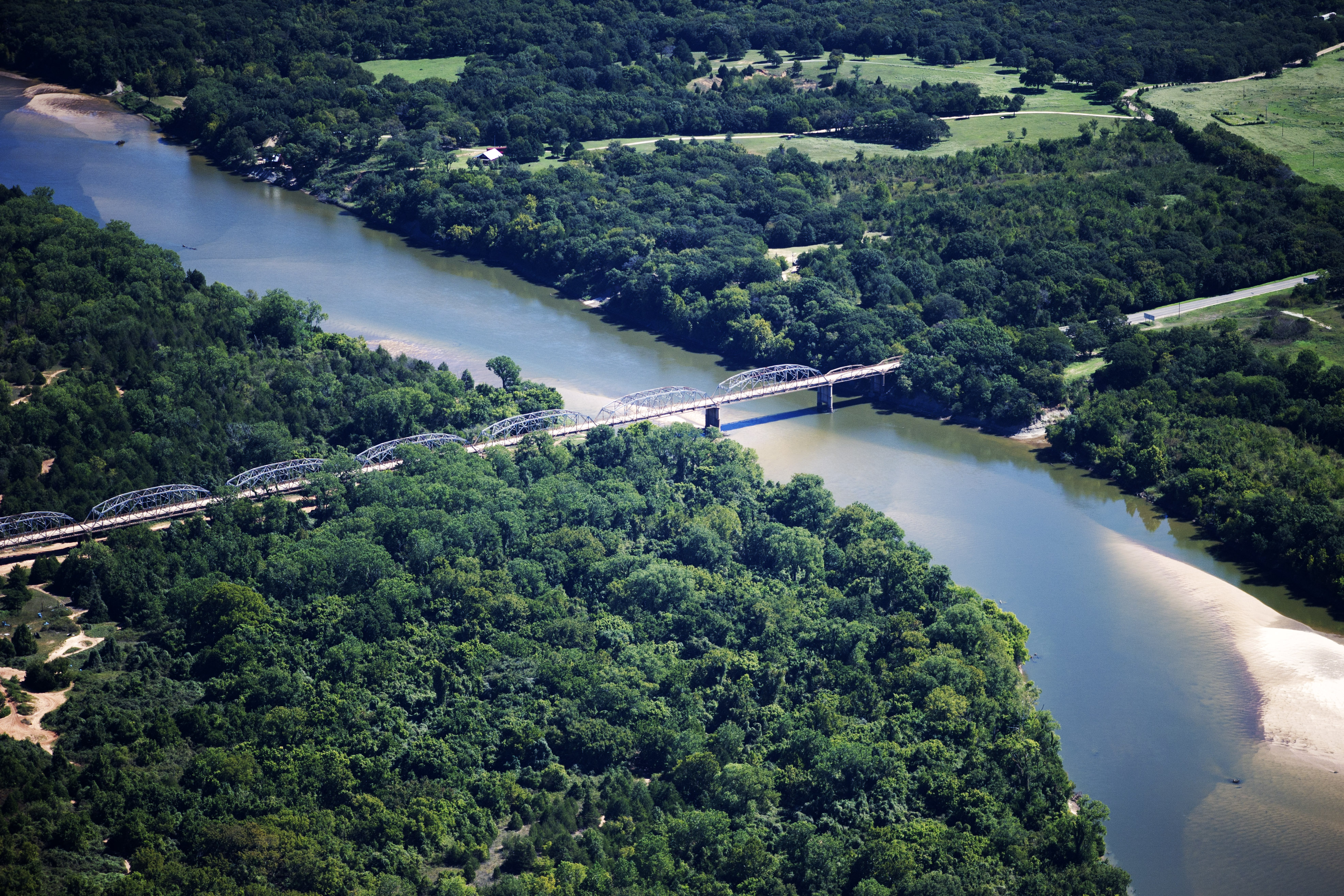
SH-78 crossing the Red River

State Highway 78 enters Oklahoma across the Red River on the State Highway No. 78 Bridge at the Red River, near the unincorporated community of Karma. Near Yuba, SH-78 curves west to head toward Achille, where it meets State Highway 91. It curves back north here, meets State Highway 70E, and then passes through the east part of Durant, where it crosses US-70. In northern Durant, SH-78 has an interchange with the US-69/75 freeway.

Three miles north of US-69/75, SH-78 turns west to head through Cobb and Brown before turning north to meet State Highway 199. It meets SH-22 for the first time at Nida. It then passes through Emet and turns back west at Milburn. It then meets SH-22 for a second time three miles (5 km) east of Tishomingo. It then joins SH-22 into Tishomingo, where it ends at US-377/SH-99.

== History ==
The road that would become SH-78 was originally commissioned as SH-299 on November 22, 1938. SH-299 was renumbered to SH-78 in its entirety in 1955, most likely to match the route number of TX-78.

== Previous Routes ==
SH-78 was originally designated as a route from Boise City to the Texas Border. This route became US 385 in 1955.

== Junction list ==
County	Location	mi	km	Destinations	Notes
Bryan	Red River	0.00	0.00	SH 78 south	Continuation into Texas
Bryan	Red River	0.00	0.00	State Highway 78 Bridge at the Red River	
Bryan	Achille	15.9	25.6	SH-91	
Bryan		22.4	36.0	SH-70E	
Bryan	Durant			US 70	Interchange
Bryan	Durant	30.5	49.1	US 69 / US 75 – Atoka, Denison TX	Half-folded diamond interchange
Bryan		32.8	52.8	SH-48	Southern terminus of SH-48
Bryan	Brown	40.9	65.8	SH-199	Eastern terminus of SH-199
Johnston	Nida	44.1	71.0	SH-22 east – Caddo	South end of SH-22 overlap
Johnston	Nida	44.3	71.3	SH-22 west – Butcher Pen	North end of SH-22 overlap
Johnston	Milburn	52.2	84.0	SH-48A	
Johnston		57.4	92.4	SH-22 east – Nida	South end of SH-22 overlap
Johnston	Tishomingo	60.0	96.6	US 377 / SH-99 north (Kemp Avenue) US 377 / SH-99 south (SH-22 west)	Northern terminus; north end of SH-22 overlap; road continues west as US-377/SH-99 south/SH-22 west (Main Street)
1.000 mi = 1.609 km; 1.000 km = 0.621 mi: Concurrency terminus
