= Bee, Oklahoma =

- Census-designated place
- Location within Oklahoma Location within the United States
- Coordinates: 34°07′19″N 96°34′07″W
- Country: United States
- State: Oklahoma
- County: Johnston

Area
  - Total: 1.31 sq mi (3.39 km^{2})
  - Land: 1.30 sq mi (3.37 km^{2})
  - Water: 0.0077 sq mi (0.02 km^{2})
- Elevation: 692 ft (211 m)

Population (2020)
  - Total: 135
  - Density: 103.7/sq mi (40.02/km^{2})
- Time zone: UTC-6 (Central (CST))
  - Summer (DST): UTC-5 (CDT)
- Area codes: 918 & 539
- GNIS feature ID: 2629906

Bee is an unincorporated community and census-designated place in Johnston County, Oklahoma, United States. The population was 135 as of the 2020 Census.

Bee is generally situated southeast of Tishomingo and northwest of Durant, located southwest of State Highway 22 and west of State Highway 78, while bordered on its west by the far northern end of Lake Texoma. The Fort Washita Historic Site is just to the southeast.

== History ==
The community was intended to be named after Dee Taylor, the daughter of two early settlers; however, the U.S. Post Office Department changed the name to "Bee". Its post office operated from April 5, 1889, until June 15, 1918.

== Geography ==
According to the U.S. Census Bureau, the community has an area of 1.306 square miles (3.38 km^{2}); 1.299 square miles (3.36 km^{2}) of its area is land, and 0.007 square miles (0.018 km^{2}) is water.

== Demographics ==
Historical population
Census	Pop.	Note	%±
2020	135		—
U.S. Decennial Census

=== 2020 census ===
As of the 2020 census, Bee had a population of 135. The median age was 39.8 years. 23.7% of residents were under the age of 18 and 26.7% of residents were 65 years of age or older. For every 100 females there were 90.1 males, and for every 100 females age 18 and over there were 90.7 males age 18 and over.

0.0% of residents lived in urban areas, while 100.0% lived in rural areas.

There were 53 households in Bee, of which 26.4% had children under the age of 18 living in them. Of all households, 43.4% were married-couple households, 41.5% were households with a male householder and no spouse or partner present, and 13.2% were households with a female householder and no spouse or partner present. About 34.0% of all households were made up of individuals and 22.7% had someone living alone who was 65 years of age or older.

There were 80 housing units, of which 33.8% were vacant. The homeowner vacancy rate was 0.0% and the rental vacancy rate was 41.7%.

Racial composition as of the 2020 census
Race	Number	Percent
White	97	71.9%
Black or African American	0	0.0%
American Indian and Alaska Native	19	14.1%
Asian	0	0.0%
Native Hawaiian and Other Pacific Islander	0	0.0%
Some other race	5	3.7%
Two or more races	14	10.4%
Hispanic or Latino (of any race)	12	8.9%
