= Cartwright, Oklahoma =

Unincorporated community in Oklahoma, US

- Rural Community
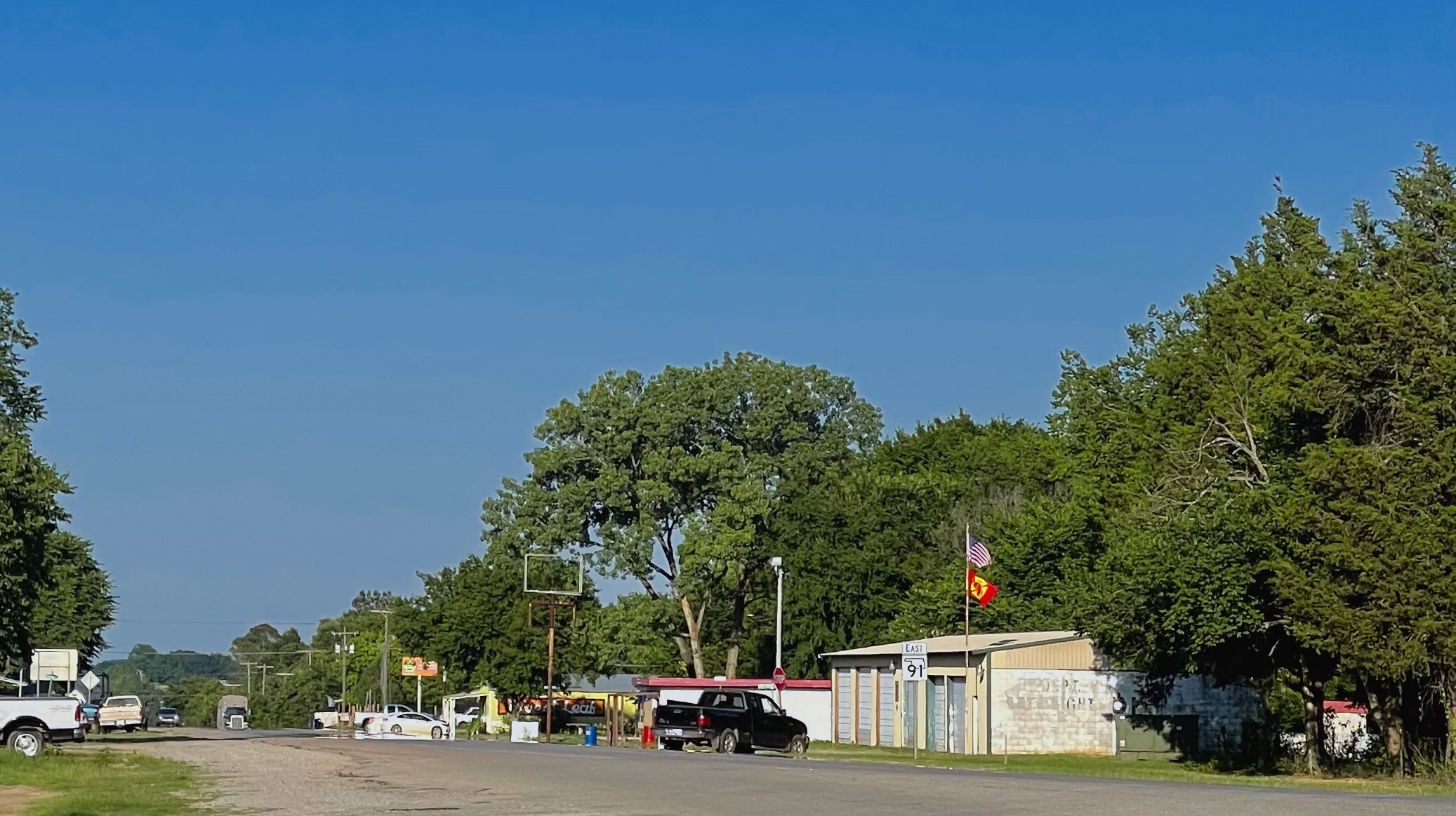
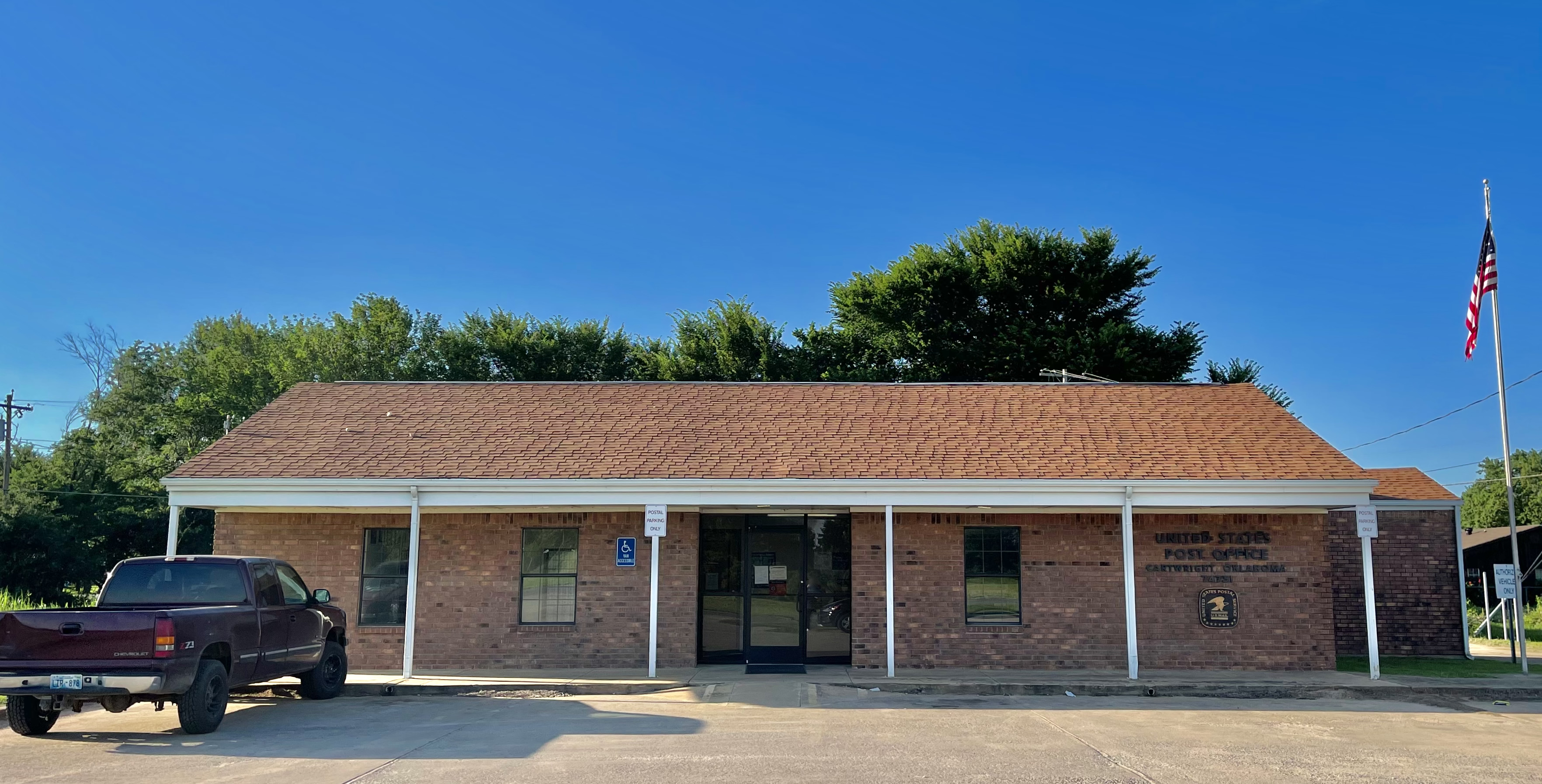
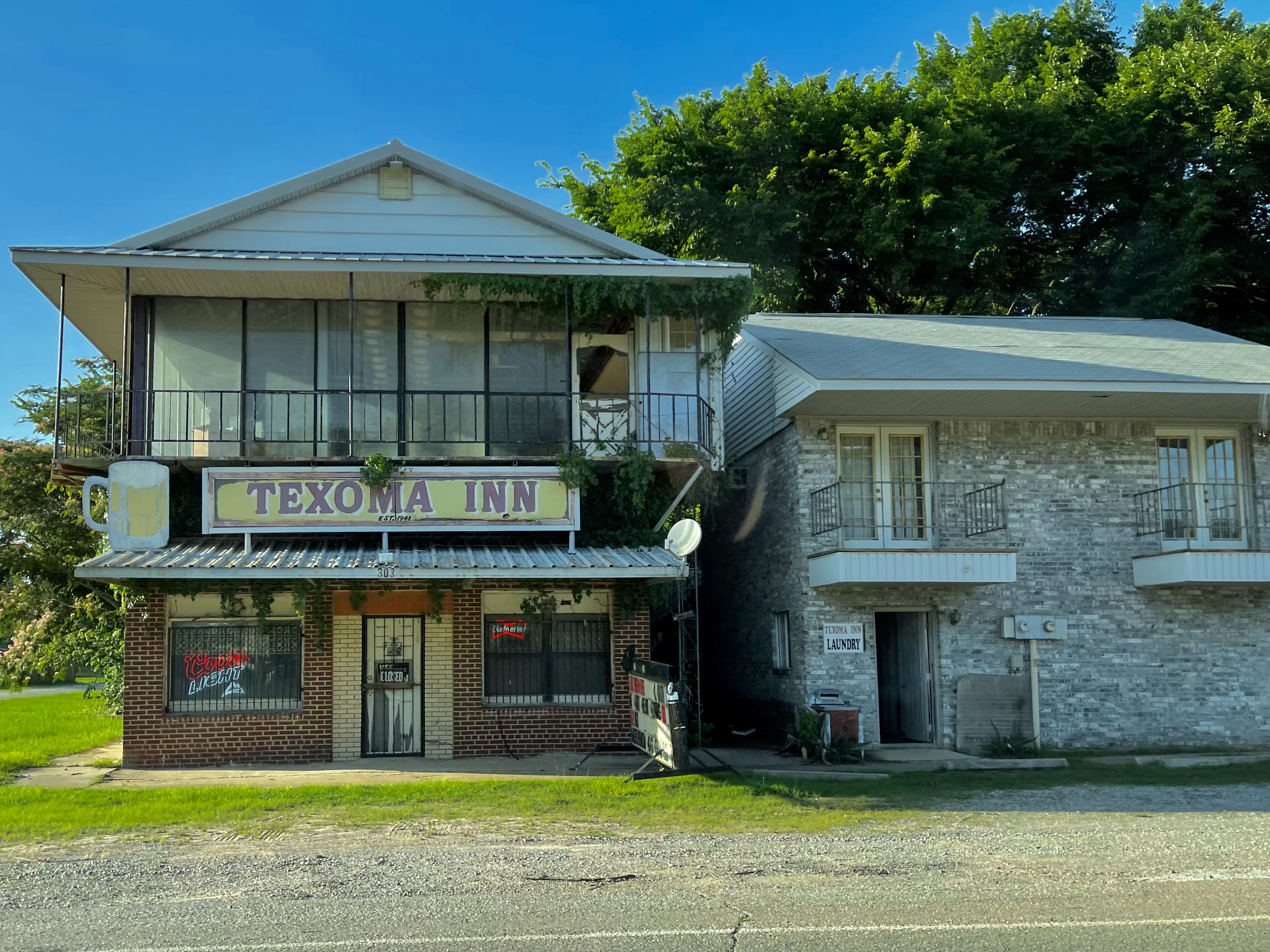
- Top to bottom, left to right: Viewing east on Oklahoma State Highway 91 in Cartwright, the city's United States Postal Service post office, and the Texoma Inn
- Interactive map of Cartwright, Oklahoma
- Coordinates: 33°51′20″N 96°33′40″W
- Country: United States
- State: Oklahoma
- County: Bryan

Area
  - Total: 2.371 sq mi (6.14 km^{2})
  - Land: 2.37 sq mi (6.1 km^{2})
  - Water: 0.01 sq mi (0.026 km^{2})
- Elevation: 666 ft (203 m)

Population (2020)
  - Total: 492
- Time zone: UTC-6 (Central (CST))
  - Summer (DST): UTC-5 (CDT)
- ZIP code: 74731
- Area code: 580
- GNIS feature ID: 2629910

Cartwright is an unincorporated rural community and census-designated place in Bryan County, Oklahoma, United States. As of the 2020 census it had a population of 492.' The post office opened April 25, 1940, and it is one of the newest communities in Bryan County. The ZIP code is 74731.

It is named for Congressman Wilburn Cartwright. Cartwright was established because of the construction of Denison Dam when a community of shelters for workmen was erected.

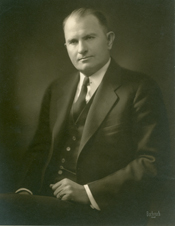
Wilburn Cartwright

== Overview ==
In Cartwright for the years 2010–2014, the median household income is $27,212 and the median house value is $101,500. The median year that a house in Cartwright was built is 1983. The average temperature of Cartwright is 62.50 °F (16.94 °C).

== Demographics ==
=== 2020 census ===
As of the 2020 census, Cartwright had a population of 492. The median age was 47.8 years. 20.7% of residents were under the age of 18 and 27.2% of residents were 65 years of age or older. For every 100 females there were 133.2 males, and for every 100 females age 18 and over there were 122.9 males age 18 and over.

0.0% of residents lived in urban areas, while 100.0% lived in rural areas.

There were 194 households in Cartwright, of which 27.8% had children under the age of 18 living in them. Of all households, 42.8% were married-couple households, 23.7% were households with a male householder and no spouse or partner present, and 25.8% were households with a female householder and no spouse or partner present. About 30.9% of all households were made up of individuals and 18.0% had someone living alone who was 65 years of age or older.

There were 254 housing units, of which 23.6% were vacant. The homeowner vacancy rate was 0.0% and the rental vacancy rate was 27.4%.

Racial composition as of the 2020 census
| Race | Number | Percent |
|---|---|---|
| White | 382 | 77.6% |
| Black or African American | 3 | 0.6% |
| American Indian and Alaska Native | 44 | 8.9% |
| Asian | 2 | 0.4% |
| Native Hawaiian and Other Pacific Islander | 0 | 0.0% |
| Some other race | 17 | 3.5% |
| Two or more races | 44 | 8.9% |
| Hispanic or Latino (of any race) | 38 | 7.7% |
