= Oklahoma State Highway 48 =

State highway in Oklahoma, United States

State Highway 48

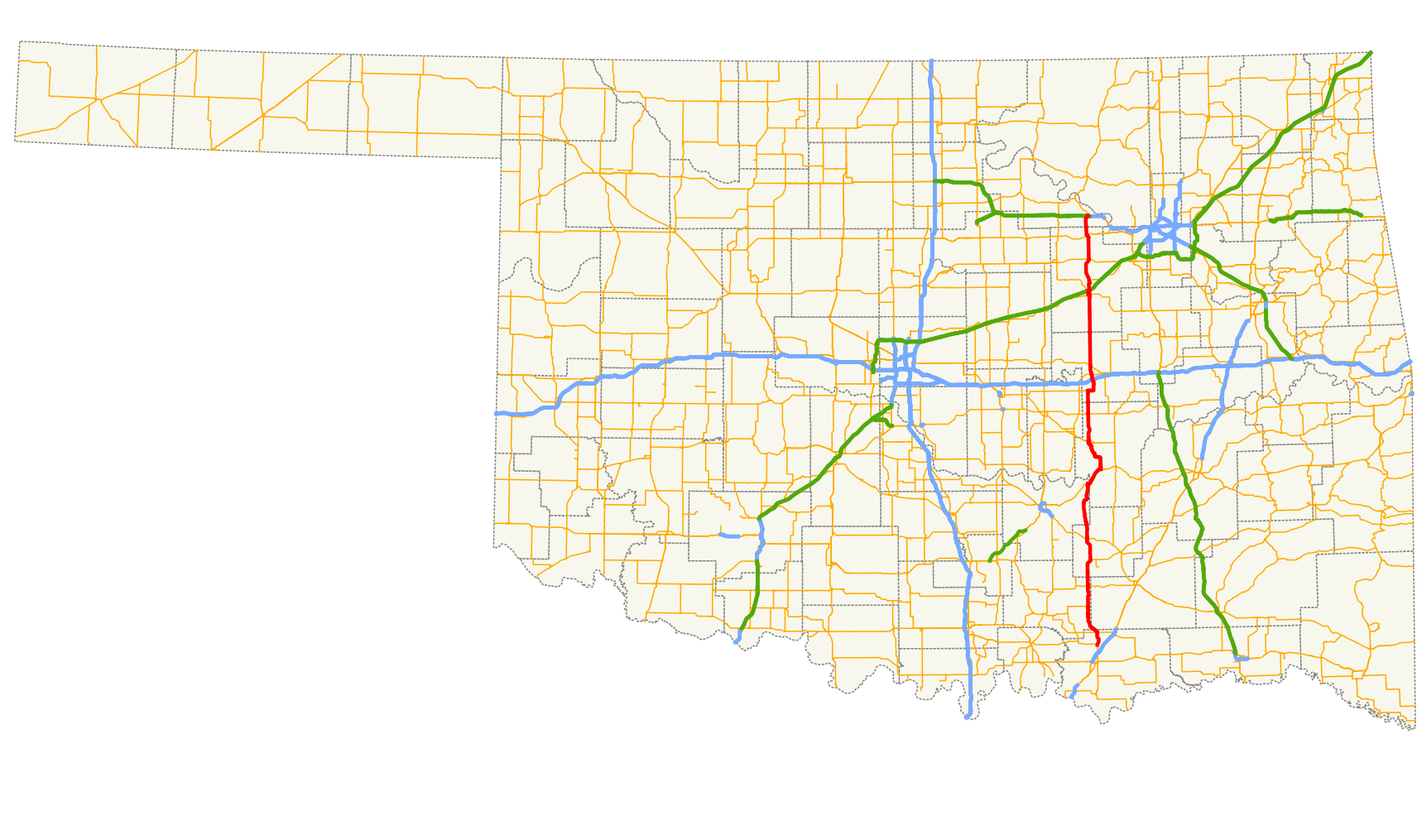

Route information
- Maintained by ODOT
- Length: 159.5 mi (256.7 km)

Major junctions
- South end: SH-78 in Durant
- SH-3 in Tupelo; US 270 / US 270 Bus. in Holdenville; I-40 near Bearden; US 62 in Castle; I-44 / Turner Turnpike in Bristow; Future I-42 / US 412 / Cimarron Turnpike near Westport
- North end: US 64 south of Cleveland

Location
- Country: United States
- State: Oklahoma

Highway system
- Oklahoma State Highway System; Interstate; US; State; Turnpikes
← SH-47	→ SH-49

State Highway 48 (abbreviated SH-48) is a state highway in eastern Oklahoma that runs nearly 159.1 miles (256.0 km) from Bryan County to Pawnee County. SH-48 has one lettered spur, SH-48A, in Johnston County.

== Route description ==
SH-48 begins at SH-78 six miles (9.7 km) north of Durant. Running north, it is five miles (8.0 km) to the first highway intersection, SH-22, just west of Kenefic. Highway 48 continues on to the north, passing through the community of Folsom, and at Coleman, SH-48A spurs off to the west, towards the town of Milburn.

Seven miles ahead is Wapanucka, and the junction with SH-7. Nine miles past Wapanucka, SH-31 intersects, heading to the east, and in seven more miles Highway 48 reaches the town of Tupelo. Just north of Tupelo, SH-48 intersects SH-3, and then continues for 13 miles (21 km) to Allen, where it joins SH-1 for a seven-mile (11 km) concurrency to Atwood.

At Atwood, SH-48 splits off to the north, crosses the Canadian River,(the road originally angled west parallel to the river but was eventually rerouted after years of the river undercutting the roadbed) and soon enters the city of Holdenville, seat of Hughes County. SH-48 meets US-270 Business in Holdenville, then intersects US-270 just north of town. SH-48 intersects with SH-9 in northwestern Hughes County, and then turns to the east the junction with SH-99A, just west of Bearden.

Highway 48 turns back to the north soon after leaving Bearden, and crosses the North Canadian River just south of the I-40 junction. Two miles after I-40, SH-48 crosses SH-56 five miles (8.0 km) west of Okemah, then US-62 five miles (8.0 km) after that, just west of Castle.

The 25 miles (40 km) between US-62 and the SH-16 junction in Bristow is very rural, with no settlements of any size. At Bristow, SH-48 joins SH-16 and SH-66 for a short three-route concurrency through town. SH-16 branches off just north of downtown Bristow, and SH-48/SH-66 intersect with I-44/Turner Turnpike at Bristow's northern edge.

Four miles after I-44, SH-66 splits off the east, and Highway 48 continues north eight miles (13 km) to SH-33, then another nine miles (14 km) to SH-51, two miles (3.2 km) west of Mannford. SH-48 crosses the Cimarron River and skirts the western edge of Keystone Lake as it travels its final few miles, intersecting with US-412/Cimarron Turnpike just before terminating at US-64, eight miles (13 km) south of Cleveland.

== SH-48A ==
State Highway 48A
- Location: Johnston County, Oklahoma
- Length: 9.39 mi (15.11 km)

SH-48 has one lettered spur, State Highway 48A. SH-48A connects SH-48 to SH-78 at Milburn, in Johnston County.

== Junction list ==
County	Location	mi	km	Destinations	Notes
Bryan	Durant	0.0	0.0	SH-78	Southern terminus
Bryan	Kenefic	4.6	7.4	SH-22	
Johnston	Coleman	14.8	23.8	SH-48A	
Johnston	Wapanucka	22.0	35.4	SH-7	
Coal		31.4	50.5	SH-31	
Coal		39.1	62.9	SH-3	
Pontotoc	Allen	59.1	95.1	SH-1	Western end of SH-1 concurrency
Hughes	Atwood	66.2	106.5	SH-1	Eastern end of SH-1 concurrency
Hughes	Holdenville	76.9	123.8	US 270 Bus.	Southern end of US-270 Bus. concurrency
Hughes	Holdenville	78.2	125.9	US 270 / US 270 Bus.	Northern terminus of US-270 Bus.
Hughes		87.8	141.3	SH-9	
Okfuskee	Bearden	95.8	154.2	SH-99A	
Okfuskee		101.6	163.5	I-40	I-40 exit 217
Okfuskee		103.4	166.4	SH-56	
Okfuskee		106.5	171.4	US 62	
Creek	Bristow	131.1	211.0	SH-16	Southern end of SH-16 concurrency
Creek	Bristow	131.5	211.6	SH-66	Southern end of SH-66 concurrency
Creek	Bristow	132.2	212.8	SH-16	Northern end of SH-16 concurrency
Creek	Bristow	132.6	213.4	I-44 Toll / Turner Turnpike	I-44 exit 196
Creek		135.2	217.6	SH-66	Northern end of SH-66 concurrency
Creek		144.1	231.9	SH-33	
Creek		152.5	245.4	SH-51	
Pawnee		159.2	256.2	US 412 / Cimarron Turnpike	Access to westbound US-412 only, eastbound access via US-64
Pawnee		159.5	256.7	US 64	Northern terminus
1.000 mi = 1.609 km; 1.000 km = 0.621 mi: Concurrency terminus; Tolled
