= Oklahoma State Highway 91 =

State highway in Oklahoma, United States

State Highway 91

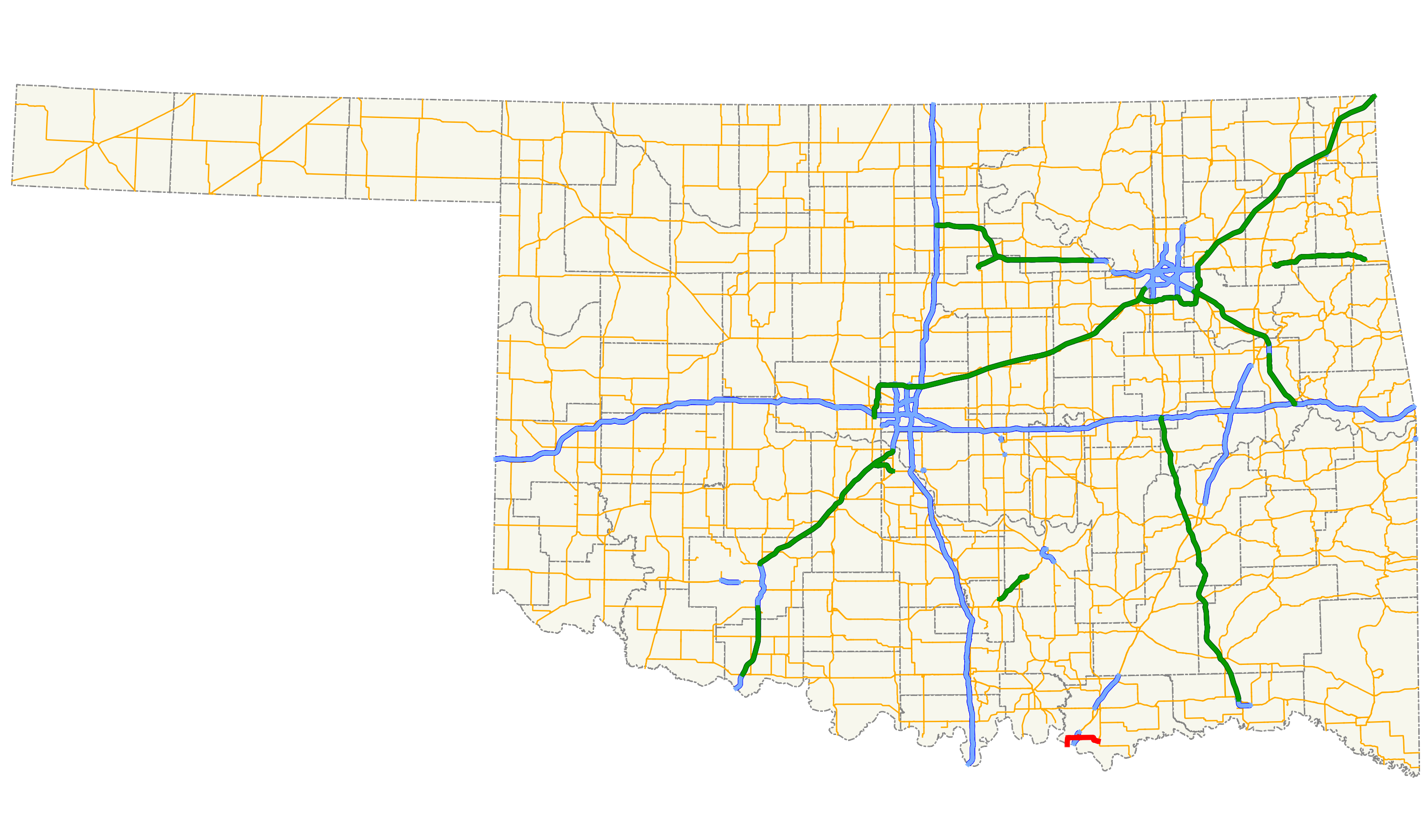

Route information
- Maintained by ODOT
- Length: 13.58 mi (21.85 km)

Major junctions
- West end: SH 91 south of Cartwright
- US 69 / US 75 in Colbert
- East end: SH-78 in Achille

Location
- Country: United States
- State: Oklahoma

Highway system
- Oklahoma State Highway System; Interstate; US; State; Turnpikes
← SH-89	→ SH-92

State Highway 91 (abbreviated SH-91 or OK-91) is a state highway in the U.S. state of Oklahoma. It runs for 13.58 miles (21.85 km), entirely within Bryan County. SH-91 has no lettered spur routes.

== Route description ==
SH-91 begins at Denison Dam at Lake Texoma, connecting to Texas State Highway 91 and heading north. Shortly after reaching the shore it turns east to run through Cartwright. It then has an interchange with US-69 / US-75 near Colbert. SH-91 then ends at SH-78 in Achille.

== History ==
SH-91 was originally State Highway 75A, but was renumbered as a continuation of SH 91 in Texas.

== Junction list ==
County	Location	mi	km	Destinations	Notes
Lake Texoma–Red River		0.0	0.0	Denison Dam; SH 91 continues south into Texas	
Bryan	Colbert	5.5	8.9	US 69 / US 75	Diamond interchange with one loop ramp
Bryan	Achille	13.6	21.9	SH-78	Eastern terminus
1.000 mi = 1.609 km; 1.000 km = 0.621 mi
