= State Highway 78 Bridge at the Red River =

- U.S. National Register of Historic Places
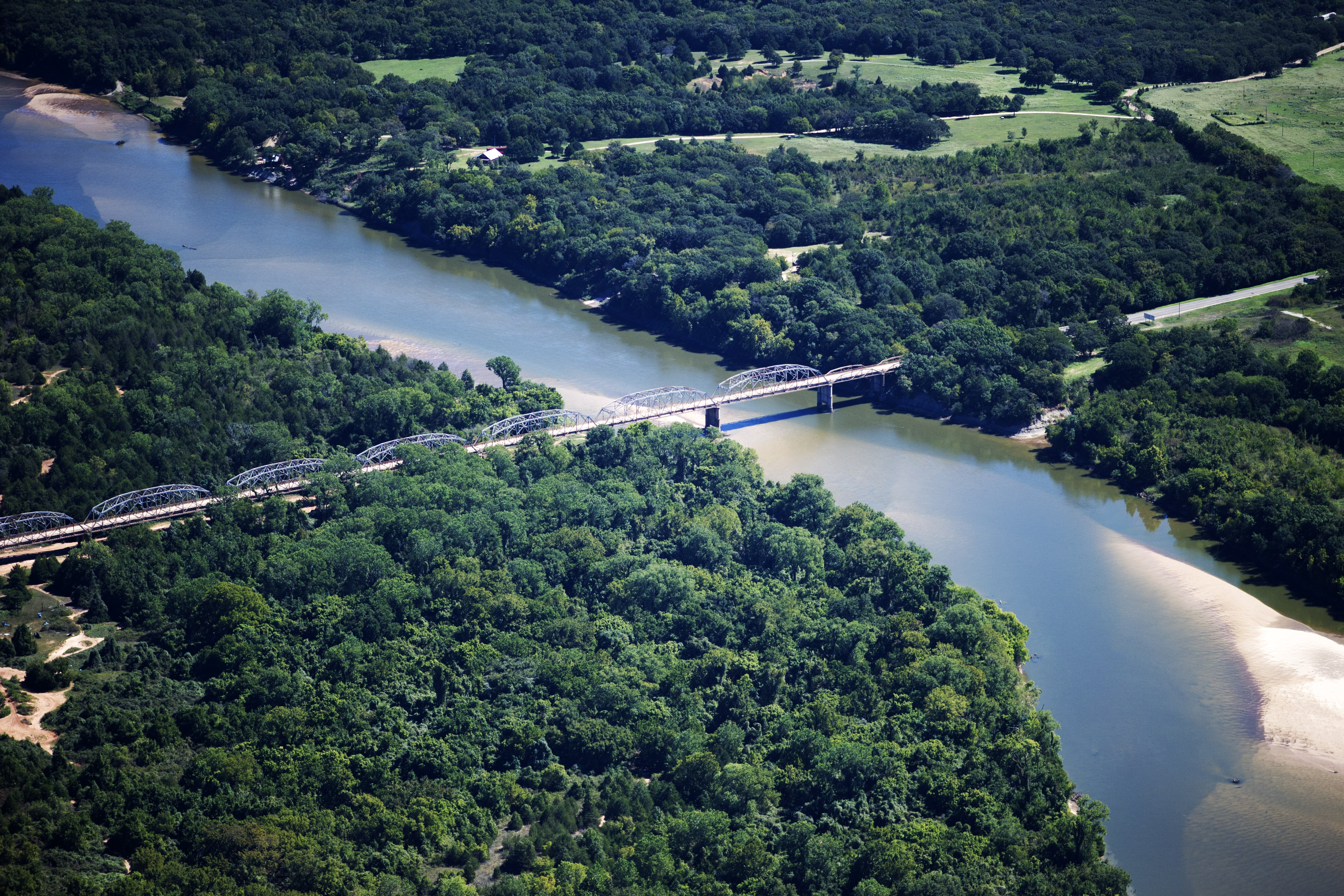
- State Highway 78 Bridge

- Location within Oklahoma Location within Texas Location within the United States
- Location: Between Texas State Highway 78 and Oklahoma State Highway 78 over Red River
- Nearest city: Ravenna, Texas, Yuba, Oklahoma
- Coordinates: 33°45′10″N 96°11′45″W
- Area: 1.2 acres (0.49 ha)
- Built: 1937
- Built by: Illinois Steel Bridge Company, et al
- Architect: Oklahoma Highway Commission
- Architectural style: K-truss through bridge
- MPS: Historic Bridges of Texas MPS
- NRHP reference No.: 96001517
- Added to NRHP: December 20, 1996

The Highway 78 Bridge at the Red River is an eight-span through truss bridge over the Red River between Oklahoma and Texas on Oklahoma State Highway 78/Texas State Highway 78. It was built as a federal relief project during the Great Depression as part of President Franklin Roosevelt's New Deal. Today the bridge and the area retain the look and feel of the time of its construction. As part of Highway 78 the bridge's average daily traffic (as of 2006) was 1,700 cars per day.

The original bridge was demolished after flood damage and a new bridge built in 2018

== History ==
The State Highway 78 Bridge at the Red River replaced a suspension bridge that collapsed on January 15, 1934. The former bridge had been opened as a toll bridge in July 1927. It was purchased by Oklahoma and Texas for use as a free bridge. It collapsed in a storm after the swinging bridge's wire cables became twisted and snapped.

As a Federal Relief Project funded by the National Industrial Recovery Act of 1933 construction began on February 16, 1937. It was completed in 1938.

The bridge marks the location of Sowell's Bluff.

== Architecture ==
The Oklahoma Highway Commission designed the bridge. Constructed in 1937–1938 by the Kansas City Bridge Co. of Kansas City, Missouri. the bridge is designed as a rare example of a K-Parker through truss bridge with camelback pony spans. The bridge consists of eight riveted K-truss through spans with two camelback pony truss spans at each end.

The Illinois Steel Bridge Company of Jacksonville, Illinois was subcontracted to fabricate the trusses.

== See also ==
- National Register of Historic Places listings in Bryan County, Oklahoma
- National Register of Historic Places listings in Fannin County, Texas
- List of bridges on the National Register of Historic Places in Oklahoma
- List of bridges on the National Register of Historic Places in Texas

== Overview ==
- Length of largest span: 210.0 ft.
- Total length: 2,108.0 ft.
- Deck width: 24.0 ft.
- Vertical clearance above deck: 15.9 ft.
