= Pontotoc =

Pontotoc may refer to:

- Fulton, Kentucky, formerly known as Pontotoc
- Pontotoc, Mississippi
- Pontotoc, Texas
- Pontotoc County, Mississippi
- Pontotoc County, Oklahoma
- Pontotoc, Oklahoma, an unincorporated community in Johnston County
