= Ravia, Oklahoma =

- Town
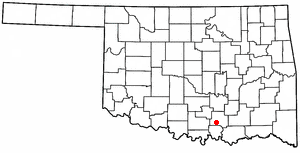
- Location of Ravia, Oklahoma
- Coordinates: 34°14′30″N 96°45′20″W
- Country: United States
- State: Oklahoma
- County: Johnston

Area
  - Total: 0.57 sq mi (1.47 km^{2})
  - Land: 0.57 sq mi (1.47 km^{2})
  - Water: 0 sq mi (0.00 km^{2})
- Elevation: 748 ft (228 m)

Population (2020)
  - Total: 464
  - Density: 817.8/sq mi (315.74/km^{2})
- Time zone: UTC-6 (Central (CST))
  - Summer (DST): UTC-5 (CDT)
- ZIP code: 73455
- Area code: 580
- FIPS code: 40-62000
- GNIS feature ID: 2412532
- Website: townofravia.org

Ravia is a town in Johnston County, Oklahoma, United States. The population was 464 as of the 2020 Census. The locale is old enough to appear on a 1911 Rand McNally map of the county.

== Geography ==
Ravia is located in southwestern Johnston County. Oklahoma State Highway 1 passes through the town, leading north 44 miles (71 km) to Ada and southwest 8 miles (13 km) to its terminus at U.S. 177. State Highway 22 runs east from Ravia 4 miles (6 km) to Tishomingo, the Johnston county seat.

According to the United States Census Bureau, Ravia has a total area of 0.54 square miles (1.4 km^{2}), all land.

== Demographics ==
Historical population
Census	Pop.	Note	%±
1900	128		—
1910	556		334.4%
1920	513		−7.7%
1930	345		−32.7%
1940	424		22.9%
1950	327		−22.9%
1960	307		−6.1%
1970	373		21.5%
1980	487		30.6%
1990	404		−17.0%
2000	459		13.6%
2010	528		15.0%
2020	464		−12.1%
U.S. Decennial Census

=== 2020 census ===
As of the 2020 census, Ravia had a population of 464. The median age was 40.3 years. 21.8% of residents were under the age of 18 and 15.7% of residents were 65 years of age or older. For every 100 females there were 97.4 males, and for every 100 females age 18 and over there were 94.1 males age 18 and over.

0.0% of residents lived in urban areas, while 100.0% lived in rural areas.

There were 181 households in Ravia, of which 38.7% had children under the age of 18 living in them. Of all households, 43.6% were married-couple households, 16.0% were households with a male householder and no spouse or partner present, and 29.8% were households with a female householder and no spouse or partner present. About 24.3% of all households were made up of individuals and 11.6% had someone living alone who was 65 years of age or older.

There were 206 housing units, of which 12.1% were vacant. The homeowner vacancy rate was 2.1% and the rental vacancy rate was 0.0%.

Racial composition as of the 2020 census
Race	Number	Percent
White	321	69.2%
Black or African American	4	0.9%
American Indian and Alaska Native	74	15.9%
Asian	0	0.0%
Native Hawaiian and Other Pacific Islander	0	0.0%
Some other race	13	2.8%
Two or more races	52	11.2%
Hispanic or Latino (of any race)	24	5.2%

=== 2000 census ===
As of the census of 2000, the median income for a household in the town was $20,694, and the median income for a family was $26,094. Males had a median income of $20,962 versus $15,729 for females. The per capita income for the town was $13,391. About 26.5% of families and 30.0% of the population were below the poverty line, including 43.5% of those under age 18 and 26.2% of those age 65 or over.

== Notable person ==
- While not born in the town, country singer and actor Gene Autry was raised partially in Ravia.
