= Earl, Oklahoma =

- Unincorporated community
- Location within Oklahoma Location within the United States
- Coordinates: 34°12′12″N 96°53′21″W
- Country: United States
- State: Oklahoma
- County: Johnston

Area
  - Total: 0.30 sq mi (0.78 km^{2})
  - Land: 0.30 sq mi (0.78 km^{2})
  - Water: 0 sq mi (0.00 km^{2})
- Elevation: 728 ft (222 m)

Population (2020)
  - Total: 44
  - Density: 146.0/sq mi (56.39/km^{2})
- Time zone: UTC-6 (Central (CST))
  - Summer (DST): UTC-5 (CDT)
- FIPS code: 40-22450
- GNIS feature ID: 2812852

Earl is an unincorporated community and census-designated place in Johnston County, Oklahoma, United States. The population was 44 as of the 2020 Census. A post office operated in Earl from 1893 to 1908.

== Demographics ==
Historical population
Census	Pop.	Note	%±
2020	44		—
U.S. Decennial Census

=== 2020 census ===
As of the 2020 census, Earl had a population of 44. The median age was 44.0 years. 29.5% of residents were under the age of 18 and 29.5% of residents were 65 years of age or older. For every 100 females there were 57.1 males, and for every 100 females age 18 and over there were 63.2 males age 18 and over.

0.0% of residents lived in urban areas, while 100.0% lived in rural areas.

There were 19 households in Earl, of which 21.1% had children under the age of 18 living in them. Of all households, 73.7% were married-couple households, 26.3% were households with a male householder and no spouse or partner present, and 0.0% were households with a female householder and no spouse or partner present. About 5.3% of all households were made up of individuals and 0.0% had someone living alone who was 65 years of age or older.

There were 19 housing units, of which 0.0% were vacant. The homeowner vacancy rate was 0.0% and the rental vacancy rate was 0.0%.

Racial composition as of the 2020 census
Race	Number	Percent
White	36	81.8%
Black or African American	0	0.0%
American Indian and Alaska Native	3	6.8%
Asian	0	0.0%
Native Hawaiian and Other Pacific Islander	0	0.0%
Some other race	0	0.0%
Two or more races	5	11.4%
Hispanic or Latino (of any race)	1	2.3%
