= Russett, Oklahoma =

- Unincorporated community
- Location within Oklahoma Location within the United States
- Coordinates: 34°11′24″N 96°48′18″W
- Country: United States
- State: Oklahoma
- County: Johnston
- Elevation: 679 ft (207 m)
- Time zone: UTC-6 (Central (CST))
  - Summer (DST): UTC-5 (CDT)
- GNIS feature ID: 1097547

Russett is an unincorporated community in Johnston County, Oklahoma, United States. A post office operated in Russett from 1894 to 1924.
