= Cobb, Oklahoma =

Unincorporated community in Oklahoma, US

Cobb
- Unincorporated community
- Location within the state of Oklahoma Cobb (the United States)
- Coordinates: 34°05′05″N 96°24′28″W
- Country: United States
- State: Oklahoma
- County: Bryan
- Time zone: UTC-6 (Central (CST))
  - Summer (DST): UTC-5 (CDT)
- GNIS feature ID: 1091526

Cobb is an unincorporated community in Bryan County, Oklahoma, United States. It is located about 8 miles north of Durant on Oklahoma State Highway 78.

This is not to be confused with the former locale of Cobb located in Okmulgee County, Oklahoma, as shown on a 1911 Rand-McNally map of that county.
