= Fillmore, Oklahoma =

- Unincorporated community
- Location within Oklahoma Location within the United States
- Coordinates: 34°16′27″N 96°29′46″W
- Country: United States
- State: Oklahoma
- County: Johnston
- Elevation: 748 ft (228 m)
- Time zone: UTC-6 (Central (CST))
  - Summer (DST): UTC-5 (CDT)
- Area code: 580
- GNIS feature ID: 1092812

Fillmore is an unincorporated community in Johnston County, Oklahoma, United States.

== History ==
A post office operated in Fillmore from 1902 to 1965. The community was named after a local resident, Elias Fillmore, who was a Chickasaw.
