= Troy, Oklahoma =

- Unincorporated community
- Location within Oklahoma Location within the United States
- Coordinates: 34°19′38″N 96°46′54″W
- Country: United States
- State: Oklahoma
- County: Johnston
- Elevation: 942 ft (287 m)
- Time zone: UTC-6 (Central (CST))
  - Summer (DST): UTC-5 (CDT)
- GNIS feature ID: 1098992

Troy is an unincorporated community in Johnston County, Oklahoma, United States. A post office operated in Troy from 1897 to 1954. The community was named after Troy, New York. Ten Acre Rock quarry near Troy was the source of the granite used to build the Oklahoma State Capitol.
