= Reagan, Oklahoma =

Reagan, Oklahoma, USA
- Unincorporated community and Census designated place
- Location within Oklahoma Location within the United States
- Coordinates: 34°20′56″N 96°43′10″W
- Country: United States
- State: Oklahoma
- County: Johnston

Area
  - Total: 0.91 sq mi (2.35 km^{2})
  - Land: 0.89 sq mi (2.30 km^{2})
  - Water: 0.015 sq mi (0.04 km^{2})
- Elevation: 899 ft (274 m)

Population (2020)
  - Total: 67
  - Density: 75.4/sq mi (29.12/km^{2})
- Time zone: UTC-6 (Central (CST))
  - Summer (DST): UTC-5 (CDT)
- FIPS code: 40-62100
- GNIS feature ID: 2805351

Reagan is an unincorporated community and census-designated place in Johnston County, Oklahoma, United States. The population was 67 as of the 2020 Census. A post office operated in Reagan from 1894 to 1931. The town was named after John Henninger Reagan who was Postmaster General of the Confederate States of America.

== Demographics ==
Historical population
Census	Pop.	Note	%±
2020	67		—
U.S. Decennial Census

=== 2020 census ===
As of the 2020 census, Reagan had a population of 67. The median age was 37.6 years. 28.4% of residents were under the age of 18 and 6.0% of residents were 65 years of age or older. For every 100 females there were 48.9 males, and for every 100 females age 18 and over there were 41.2 males age 18 and over.

0.0% of residents lived in urban areas, while 100.0% lived in rural areas.

There were 32 households in Reagan, of which 37.5% had children under the age of 18 living in them. Of all households, 62.5% were married-couple households, 12.5% were households with a male householder and no spouse or partner present, and 18.8% were households with a female householder and no spouse or partner present. About 21.9% of all households were made up of individuals and 12.5% had someone living alone who was 65 years of age or older.

There were 32 housing units, of which 0.0% were vacant. The homeowner vacancy rate was 0.0% and the rental vacancy rate was 0.0%.

Racial composition as of the 2020 census
Race	Number	Percent
White	40	59.7%
Black or African American	0	0.0%
American Indian and Alaska Native	16	23.9%
Asian	0	0.0%
Native Hawaiian and Other Pacific Islander	0	0.0%
Some other race	2	3.0%
Two or more races	9	13.4%
Hispanic or Latino (of any race)	3	4.5%
