= Oklahoma State Highway 22 =

State highway in Oklahoma, United States

State Highway 22

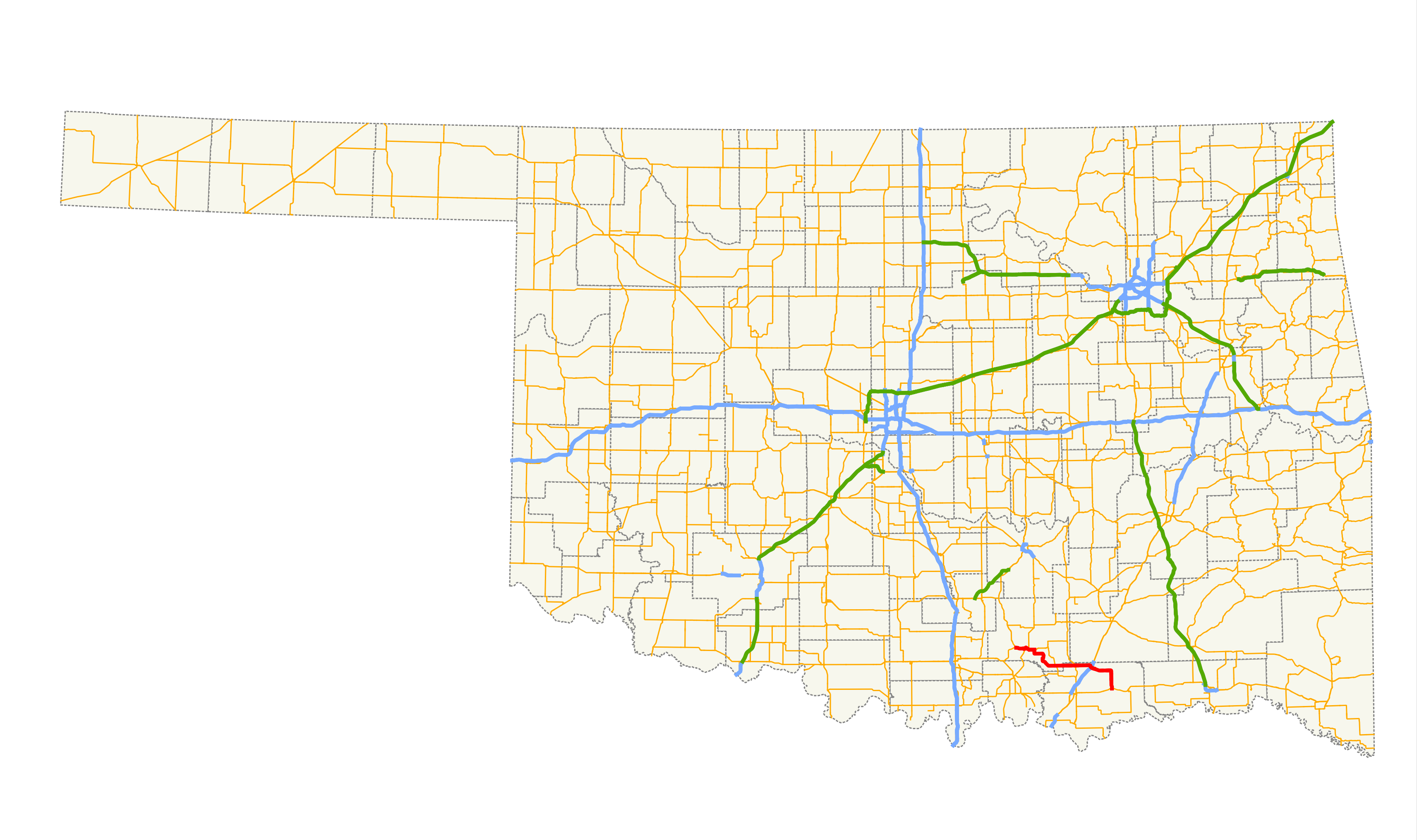

Route information
- Maintained by ODOT
- Length: 47.4 mi (76.3 km)
- Existed: August 4, 1924–present

Major junctions
- West end: SH-1 in Ravia
- US 377 / SH-99 in Tishomingo; US 69 / US 75 in Caddo
- East end: US 70 in Bokchito

Location
- Country: United States
- State: Oklahoma

Highway system
- Oklahoma State Highway System; Interstate; US; State; Turnpikes
← SH-20	→ SH-23

State Highway 22 (abbreviated SH-22) is a U.S. State highway in Oklahoma. It runs in a 47.4-mile (76.3 km) west-to-east pattern through the south-central part of the state, running from SH-1 at Ravia to US-70 at Bokchito. There are no letter-suffixed spur highways branching from SH-22.

The SH-22 designation was first established on August 4, 1924. From its original termini of Davis and Durant, the route was extended to both the east and the west, reaching its greatest extent in 1933, connecting Duncan to the Texas state line at the Red River. In 1941, the portion of SH-22 west of Ravia was dropped, and the highway's eastern terminus was set in 1956.

== Route description ==
SH-22 begins at SH-1 in the town of Ravia, in southern Johnston County. From there, it travels three miles (4.8 km) east to US-377/SH-99, where it joins with them in a one-mile (1.6 km) concurrency to Tishomingo.

In Tishomingo, SH-78 begins, concurrent with SH-22. The two highways run east for three miles (4.8 km) before splitting from one another. SH-22 turns roughly southeast and continues for 13 miles (21 km) to its second concurrency with SH-78 at Nida (unincorporated).

From here, it runs due east for seven miles (11 km) to an intersection with SH-48, just west of Kenefic, then seven more miles to the junction with US-69/US-75 outside Caddo. From Caddo, SH-22 travels east, then south, for 13 miles (21 km) to its terminus at US-70 in Bokchito, in eastern Bryan County.

== History ==
ROUTE NO. 22 Beginning at Durant in Bryan county, at a connection with State Highways, No. 5 and 6, via Milburn, Tishomingo, Ravia, Mill Creek, Sulphur, and Davis, to a connection with State Highway No. 4.

— Oklahoma State Highway Department, Official State Map, 1925 edition

SH-22 once had a much longer route. When it was commissioned on August 4, 1924, it ran from Durant to Davis, the Ravia to Davis section being current SH-1 and SH-7. It ended at the original SH-4, current US-77. In 1931, it was extended west to Ratliff City, where it ended at SH-29. In 1932, SH-29 was given a new alignment to the north; SH-22 was reassigned to the old alignment. extending it to Duncan. On its other end, SH-22 was extended south from Durant, through Achille to a stub ending east of town. In January 1933, it was extended further east, to the Donham Bridge over the Red River. On December 17, 1934, the highway was rerouted over a stretch of Farm-to-Market road between Tishomingo and Nida, bypassing Milburn. This decision was reversed in 1935 (with the old alignment becoming SH-22S) but redone in 1936.

By 1939, SH-22 had been rerouted through Milburn. This time, the southern route became SH-299, which took over SH-22 between Nida and the state line. SH-22 was truncated once again on November 22, 1941, this time all the way to Ravia, the current western terminus of the route. SH-22 and SH-299 swapped places yet again in 1946, with SH-22 once again taking the southern route. In 1956, SH-22 was extended east to its current terminus at Bokchito. Other than minor realignments, the highway in 1956 was the same as it is today.

== Junction list ==
County	Location	mi	km	Destinations	Notes
Johnston	Ravia	0.0	0.0	SH-1	Western terminus
Johnston		3.1	5.0	US 377 / SH-99	Western end of US-377/SH-99 concurrency
Johnston	Tishomingo	4.3	6.9	US 377 / SH-99 / SH-78	Eastern end of US-377/SH-99 concurrency; western terminus of SH-78; western end of SH-78 concurrency
Johnston		7.0	11.3	SH-78	Eastern end of SH-78 concurrency
Johnston	Nida	19.7	31.7	SH-78	Western end of SH-78 concurrency
Johnston	Nida	20.0	32.2	SH-78	Eastern end of SH-78 concurrency
Bryan	Kenefic	27.2	43.8	SH-48	
Bryan	Caddo	33.2	53.4	US 69 / US 75	Diamond interchange
Bryan	Bokchito	47.4	76.3	US 70	Eastern terminus
1.000 mi = 1.609 km; 1.000 km = 0.621 mi: Concurrency terminus
