= Johnston County, Oklahoma =

County in Oklahoma, United States

- County
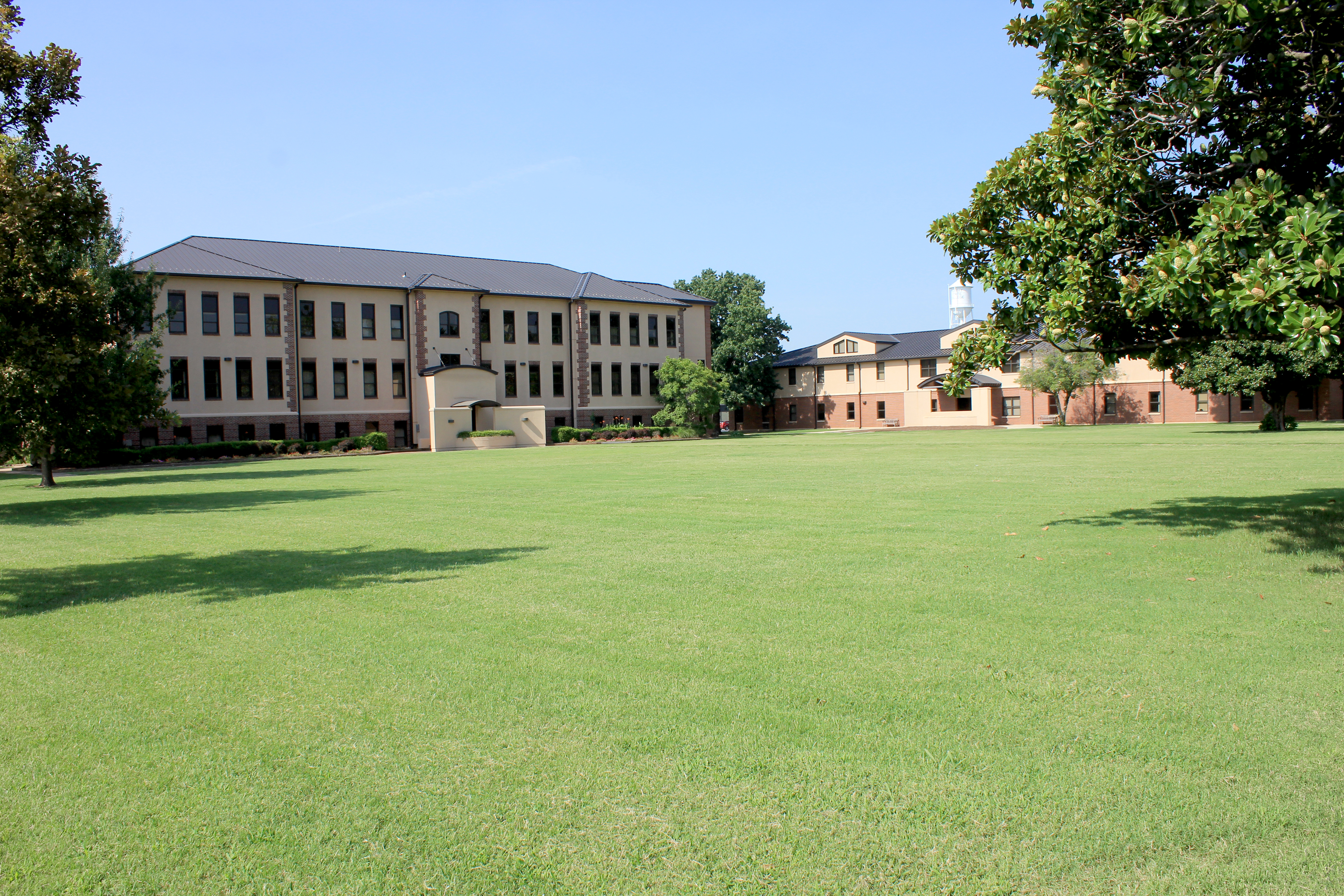
- Murray State College in Tishomingo

- Location within the U.S. state of Oklahoma
- Coordinates: 34°19′N 96°40′W
- Country: United States
- State: Oklahoma
- Founded: 1907
- Named for: Douglas H. Johnston
- Seat: Tishomingo
- Largest city: Tishomingo

Area
  - Total: 658 sq mi (1,700 km^{2})
  - Land: 643 sq mi (1,670 km^{2})
  - Water: 15 sq mi (39 km^{2}) 2.3%

Population (2020)
  - Total: 10,272
  - Estimate (2025): 10,448 ▲
  - Density: 16.0/sq mi (6.17/km^{2})
- Time zone: UTC−6 (Central)
  - Summer (DST): UTC−5 (CDT)
- Congressional district: 2nd
- Website: johnston.okcounties.org

Johnston County is a county located in the U.S. state of Oklahoma. As of the 2020 census, its population was 10,272. Its county seat is Tishomingo. It was established at statehood on November 16, 1907, and named for Douglas H. Johnston, a governor of the Chickasaw Nation.

Johnston County is part of the Texoma Region.

== History ==
In 1820, the U.S. government granted the land now known as Johnston County to the Choctaw tribe. Many of the Choctaws began moving to the new land in Indian Territory in 1830. The rest followed Chickasaw tribe, who were closely related to the Choctaw, formally separated from the Choctaw Nation in the late 1830s, relocating to the western part of the Choctaw Nation. The Chickasaw Nation named the town of Tishomingo as its capital and built a brick capitol building there in 1856.

Several educational institutions were established in the Chickasaw Nation before the Civil War. The Pleasant Grove Mission School and the Chickasaw Academy were founded by the Methodist Episcopal Church in 1844. The Presbyterians, in partnership with the Chickasaw Nation, opened the Wapanucka Female Manual Labour School in 1852.

The Chickasaw government joined the Confederate States of America after the outbreak of the Civil War. The Union army ordered its troops to evacuate Fort Washita, Fort Cobb, and Fort Arbuckle. When Confederate troops occupied the area, they used the stone building at Wapanucka as a hospital and prison.

Several railroads built tracks through this area about the turn of the 20th century. In 1900–1901, the St. Louis, Oklahoma and Southern Railway, which the St. Louis and San Francisco Railroad (Frisco) purchased in June 1901, laid tracks north–south through the area. In 1902, the Western Oklahoma Railroad, which became the Choctaw, Oklahoma and Gulf Railroad, built a line southwest to northeast through the present county. In 1908–1910 the Missouri, Oklahoma and Gulf Railway (MO&G), (acquired by the Kansas, Oklahoma and Gulf Railway in 1919,) laid a north–south line in the far eastern portion of Johnston County. In 1911, the MO&G built a spur west to Bromide, an early-twentieth-century health resort, capitalizing on the vicinity's natural springs. Now, the Burlington Northern and Santa Fe, which acquired the Frisco in 1980, is the only railroad left in the county.

== Geography ==
According to the U.S. Census Bureau, the county has a total area of 658 square miles (1,700 km^{2}), of which 15 sq mi (39 km^{2}) (2.3%) are covered by water.

The northern part of the county lies in the Arbuckle Mountains, which consist of rock outcroppings and rolling hills. The southern part of the county is part of the Coastal Plains region, and is more suitable for farming. The county is drained by the Washita and Blue Rivers and Pennington Creek, which are all tributaries of the Red River. An arm of Lake Texoma protrudes into southern Johnston County.

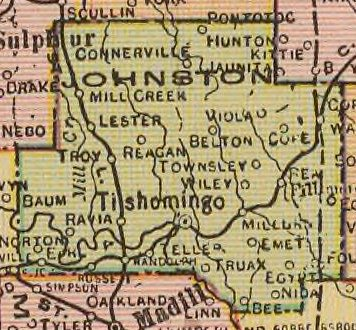
Map of Johnston County, 1909

=== Major highways ===
- U.S. Highway 377 / State Highway 99
- State Highway 1
- State Highway 7
  - State Highway 7D
- State Highway 22
- State Highway 48
  - State Highway 48A
- State Highway 78
- State Highway 199

=== Adjacent counties ===
- Pontotoc County (north)
- Coal County (northeast)
- Atoka County (east)
- Bryan County (southeast)
- Marshall County (south)
- Carter County (west)
- Murray County (northwest)

=== National protected area ===
- Tishomingo National Wildlife Refuge (part)

== Demographics ==
Historical population
Census	Pop.	Note	%±
1910	16,734		—
1920	20,125		20.3%
1930	13,082		−35.0%
1940	15,960		22.0%
1950	10,608		−33.5%
1960	8,517		−19.7%
1970	7,870		−7.6%
1980	10,356		31.6%
1990	10,032		−3.1%
2000	10,513		4.8%
2010	10,957		4.2%
2020	10,272		−6.3%
2025 (est.)	10,448	▲	1.7%
U.S. Decennial Census; 1790-1960 1900-1990; 1990-2000 2010

Johnston County, Oklahoma – Racial composition
Race (NH = Non-Hispanic)	2020	2010	2000	1990	1980
White alone (NH)	65.6% (6,735)	71.7% (7,854)	75.4% (7,927)	81% (8,126)	85% (8,803)
Black alone (NH)	2.3% (236)	1.9% (209)	1.7% (174)	2.1% (213)	2.5% (262)
American Indian alone (NH)	15.4% (1,582)	14.9% (1,636)	14.9% (1,562)	15.5% (1,558)	11.3% (1,169)
Asian alone (NH)	0.5% (52)	0.2% (27)	0.3% (28)	0.1% (14)	0% (2)
Pacific Islander alone (NH)	0% (5)	0% (1)	0% (5)		
Other race alone (NH)	0.6% (57)	0% (5)	0% (4)	0% (1)	0% (0)
Multiracial (NH)	10% (1,024)	7.3% (802)	5.3% (553)	—	—
Hispanic/Latino (any race)	5.7% (581)	3.9% (423)	2.5% (260)	1.2% (120)	1.2% (120)

=== 2020 census ===
As of the 2020 United States census, the county had a population of 10,272. Of the residents, 22.6% were under 18 and 19.7% were 65 or older; the median age was 40.4 years. For every 100 females, there were 100.9 males, and for every 100 females 18 and over, there were 99.5 males.

The racial makeup of the county was 67.1% White, 2.4% Black or African American, 16.2% American Indian and Alaska Native, 0.5% Asian, 2.4% from some other race, and 11.4% from two or more races. Hispanic or Latino residents of any race comprised 5.7% of the population. Counting only non-Hispanic residents, 65.6% were White, 15.4% were American Indian, 2.3% were Black, 0.5% were Asian, 0.6% were of some other race, and 10.0% were multiracial.

Self-reported ancestries in 2020 were English (16.5%), Chickasaw (11.6%), Irish (10.7%), German (7.1%), Choctaw (4.8%), Mexican (4.2%), Cherokee (2.4%), Choctaw Nation of Oklahoma (2.1%), African American (1.6%), and Scottish (1.5%).

Of the 3,961 households in the county, 31.5% had children under 18 living with them and 25.8% had a female householder with no spouse or partner present. About 28.3% of all households were made up of individuals, and 13.0% had someone living alone who was 65 or older.

The county had 4,682 housing units, of which 15.4% were vacant. Among occupied housing units, 71.4% were owner-occupied and 28.6% were renter-occupied. The homeowner vacancy rate was 2.0% and the rental vacancy rate was 11.8%.

=== 2000 census ===
As of the 2000 census, 10,513 people, 4,057 households, and 2,900 families resided in the county. The population density was 16 people per square mile (6.2 people/km^{2}). The 4,782 housing units had an average density of 7 units per square mile (2.7/km^{2}). The racial makeup of the county was 76.09% White, 1.66% Black or African American, 15.32% Native American, 0.27% Asian, 0.05% Pacific Islander, 1.24% from other races, and 5.38% from two or more races. About 2.47% of the population were Hispanic or Latino of any race; 97.0% spoke English, 1.6% Spanish, and 1.2% Choctaw as their first language.

Of the 4,057 households, 31.3% had children under 18 living with them, 56.6% were married couples living together, 10.7% had a female householder with no husband present, and 28.5% were not families. About 25.2% of all households were made up of individuals, and 12.2% had someone living alone who was 65 or older. The average household size was 2.53, and the average family size was 3.02.

In the county, the age distribution was 25.5% under 18, 9.7% from 18 to 24, 25.0% from 25 to 44, 24.3% from 45 to 64, and 15.4% were 65 or older. The median age was 38 years. For every 100 females, there were 96.8 males. For every 100 females 18 and over, there were 94.1 males.

The median income in the county for a household was $24,592 and for a family was $30,292. Males had a median income of $25,240 versus $19,868 for females. The per capita income for the county was $13,747. About 17.8% of families and 22.0% of the population were below the poverty line, including 28.0% of those under 18 and 19.30% of those 65 or over.

== Politics ==
Voter Registration and Party Enrollment as of June 30, 2023
Party	Number of Voters	Percentage
Democratic	1,970	33.57%
Republican	3,130	53.34%
Libertarian	38	0.65%
Independent	730	12.44%
Total	5,868	100%

United States presidential election results for Johnston County, Oklahoma
Year	Republican		Democratic		Third party(ies)	
Year	No.	%	No.	%	No.	%
1908	693	26.96%	1,274	49.57%	603	23.46%
1912	506	19.89%	1,289	50.67%	749	29.44%
1916	756	23.92%	1,727	54.63%	678	21.45%
1920	1,950	43.73%	2,117	47.48%	392	8.79%
1924	923	24.81%	2,122	57.03%	676	18.17%
1928	1,294	41.80%	1,766	57.04%	36	1.16%
1932	329	9.12%	3,277	90.88%	0	0.00%
1936	743	19.22%	3,099	80.18%	23	0.60%
1940	1,362	31.46%	2,955	68.26%	12	0.28%
1944	925	28.22%	2,339	71.35%	14	0.43%
1948	584	16.59%	2,936	83.41%	0	0.00%
1952	1,349	35.09%	2,495	64.91%	0	0.00%
1956	1,157	34.14%	2,232	65.86%	0	0.00%
1960	1,441	44.16%	1,822	55.84%	0	0.00%
1964	1,065	31.00%	2,370	69.00%	0	0.00%
1968	1,048	32.37%	1,216	37.55%	974	30.08%
1972	2,205	67.72%	983	30.19%	68	2.09%
1976	1,127	28.65%	2,765	70.28%	42	1.07%
1980	1,701	44.10%	2,066	53.56%	90	2.33%
1984	2,195	54.36%	1,820	45.07%	23	0.57%
1988	1,518	42.39%	2,042	57.02%	21	0.59%
1992	1,191	27.45%	2,096	48.31%	1,052	24.25%
1996	1,229	32.63%	1,998	53.04%	540	14.34%
2000	2,072	52.72%	1,809	46.03%	49	1.25%
2004	2,635	60.60%	1,713	39.40%	0	0.00%
2008	2,708	68.44%	1,249	31.56%	0	0.00%
2012	2,649	69.97%	1,137	30.03%	0	0.00%
2016	3,093	76.98%	786	19.56%	139	3.46%
2020	3,441	80.95%	738	17.36%	72	1.69%
2024	3,462	81.84%	684	16.17%	84	1.99%

== Education ==
Murray State School of Agriculture opened in Tishomingo in 1908. In 1972, the community college's name changed to Murray State College.

== Communities ==
=== Cities ===
- Tishomingo (county seat)

=== Towns ===
- Bromide
- Mannsville
- Milburn
- Mill Creek
- Ravia
- Wapanucka

=== Census-designated places ===
- Bee
- Coleman
- Connerville
- Earl
- Emet
- Pontotoc
- Reagan

=== Other unincorporated communities ===
- Fillmore
- Folsom
- Nida
- Russett
- Troy

== Notable people ==
- Bill Anoatubby is a former governor of the Chickasaw Nation.
- Neill Armstrong was coach of the Chicago Bears, 1979–1982.
- Gene Autry, an American performer, was raised in Ravia.
- Charles W. Blackwell was the first ambassador of the Chickasaw Nation to the United States (1995-2013).
- Te Ata Fisher, Chickasaw storyteller, was born in Emet.
- Linda Hogan, Native American storyteller
- Richard Miles McCool, WWII Medal of Honor recipient
- Alfred P. Murrah, federal district and appellate judge
- William H. "Alfalfa Bill" Murray, former governor of Oklahoma
- Johnston Murray, son of William H. Murray and also a governor of Oklahoma
- Dustin Rowe, chief justice of the Oklahoma Supreme Court
- Blake Shelton, country music singer (current resident)
- Bill Spiller, American professional golfer who helped break the color barrier in the sport
- Harriet Wright O'Leary (1916-1999), American teacher and politician and first woman to serve on the tribal council of the Choctaw Nation of Oklahoma

== See also ==
- National Register of Historic Places listings in Johnston County, Oklahoma
