= Achille Independent School District =

School district in Oklahoma

Location
- Achille, Oklahoma United States

District information
- Type: Public
- Grades: PK-12
- Superintendent: Rick Beene

Students and staff
- Students: 324 (2015-2016)
- Teachers: 21.46 (on an FTE basis)
- District mascot: Eagle

Other information
- Website: www.achilleisd.org

The Achille Independent School District is a school district based in Achille, Oklahoma (United States). There are two schools in the district.

== List of schools ==
Achille High School, high school

Achille Elementary School, pre-school through 8th grade

Yuba Elementary School, pre-school through 6th grade (closed in May 2010 due to budget cuts)

== 2018 school closure ==
In August 2018, threatening Facebook comments were made by a group of adults after a 12-year-old transgender student had used a girls bathroom, rather than a staff bathroom as she had done in previous years. A small peaceful rally in support of the student followed at the school. In consultation with law enforcement and fire department officials, Achille Public Schools closed for two days, partly out of concerns about counter-protesters and safety.

== See also ==
- List of school districts in Oklahoma
