= Folsom, Oklahoma =

- Unincorporated community
- Location within Oklahoma Location within the United States
- Coordinates: 34°11′36″N 96°25′14″W
- Country: United States
- State: Oklahoma
- County: Johnston
- Elevation: 732 ft (223 m)
- Time zone: UTC-6 (Central (CST))
  - Summer (DST): UTC-5 (CDT)
- GNIS feature ID: 1100422

Folsom is an unincorporated community in Johnston County, Oklahoma, United States. A post office operated in Folsom from 1894 to 1955. The town was named after David Folsom, who was a well-known Chickasaw.
