= Nida, Oklahoma =

- Unincorporated community
- Location within Oklahoma Location within the United States
- Coordinates: 34°08′35″N 96°29′56″W
- Country: United States
- State: Oklahoma
- County: Johnston
- Elevation: 784 ft (239 m)
- Time zone: UTC-6 (Central (CST))
  - Summer (DST): UTC-5 (CDT)
- GNIS feature ID: 1095877

Nida is an unincorporated community in Johnston County, Oklahoma, United States, along State Highway 22. A post office operated in Nida from 1895 to 1915. The first postmaster was R.F. French. The town was named after his wife, Nida French. It is the nearest community to Fort Washita, a National Historic Landmark.
