= Pontotoc, Oklahoma =

- Unincorporated community and Census designated place
- Location within Oklahoma Location within the United States
- Coordinates: 34°29′20″N 96°37′44″W
- Country: United States
- State: Oklahoma
- County: Johnston

Area
  - Total: 1.07 sq mi (2.77 km^{2})
  - Land: 1.07 sq mi (2.77 km^{2})
  - Water: 0 sq mi (0.00 km^{2})
- Elevation: 1,001 ft (305 m)

Population (2020)
  - Total: 81
  - Density: 75.7/sq mi (29.24/km^{2})
- Time zone: UTC-6 (Central (CST))
  - Summer (DST): UTC-5 (CDT)
- FIPS code: 40-60000
- GNIS feature ID: 2805348

Pontotoc is an unincorporated community and census-designated place in Johnston County, Oklahoma, United States. The population was 81 as of the 2020 Census. A post office was established in Pontotoc in 1858. The town was named after Pontotoc County, which was one of the divisions of the Chickasaw Nation.

Pontotoc is located on US Route 377/State Highway 99 south of Ada and north of Tishomingo.

== Demographics ==
Historical population
Census	Pop.	Note	%±
2020	81		—
U.S. Decennial Census

=== 2020 census ===
As of the 2020 census, Pontotoc had a population of 81. The median age was 41.5 years. 24.7% of residents were under the age of 18 and 33.3% of residents were 65 years of age or older. For every 100 females there were 161.3 males, and for every 100 females age 18 and over there were 165.2 males age 18 and over.

0.0% of residents lived in urban areas, while 100.0% lived in rural areas.

There were 40 households in Pontotoc, of which 10.0% had children under the age of 18 living in them. Of all households, 30.0% were married-couple households, 35.0% were households with a male householder and no spouse or partner present, and 30.0% were households with a female householder and no spouse or partner present. About 55.0% of all households were made up of individuals and 30.0% had someone living alone who was 65 years of age or older.

There were 45 housing units, of which 11.1% were vacant. The homeowner vacancy rate was 2.9% and the rental vacancy rate was 0.0%.

Racial composition as of the 2020 census
Race	Number	Percent
White	34	42.0%
Black or African American	0	0.0%
American Indian and Alaska Native	35	43.2%
Asian	0	0.0%
Native Hawaiian and Other Pacific Islander	0	0.0%
Some other race	0	0.0%
Two or more races	12	14.8%
Hispanic or Latino (of any race)	2	2.5%
