= Yuba, Oklahoma =

Unincorporated community in Oklahoma, US

- unincorporated community
- Location within the state of Oklahoma Yuba, Oklahoma (the United States)
- Coordinates: 33.809°N 96.204°W
- Country: United States
- State: Oklahoma
- County: Bryan
- Elevation: 495 ft (151 m)
- Time zone: UTC-6 (Central (CST))
  - Summer (DST): UTC-5 (CDT)
- Area code: 580

Yuba, formerly known as Karma, is an unincorporated community located 12 miles east of Achille in Bryan County, Oklahoma, United States. Its post office was established on February 27, 1929. The school in Yuba was also established in 1929, and served kindergarten through 12th grade. The post office was renamed Yuba on October 1, 1950. Local residents wanted the name to be changed to Eagle Lake. The Yuba Independent School district consolidated with the Achille Independent School district. The Yuba Elementary school continued to operate until 2010.
