= Denison Dam =

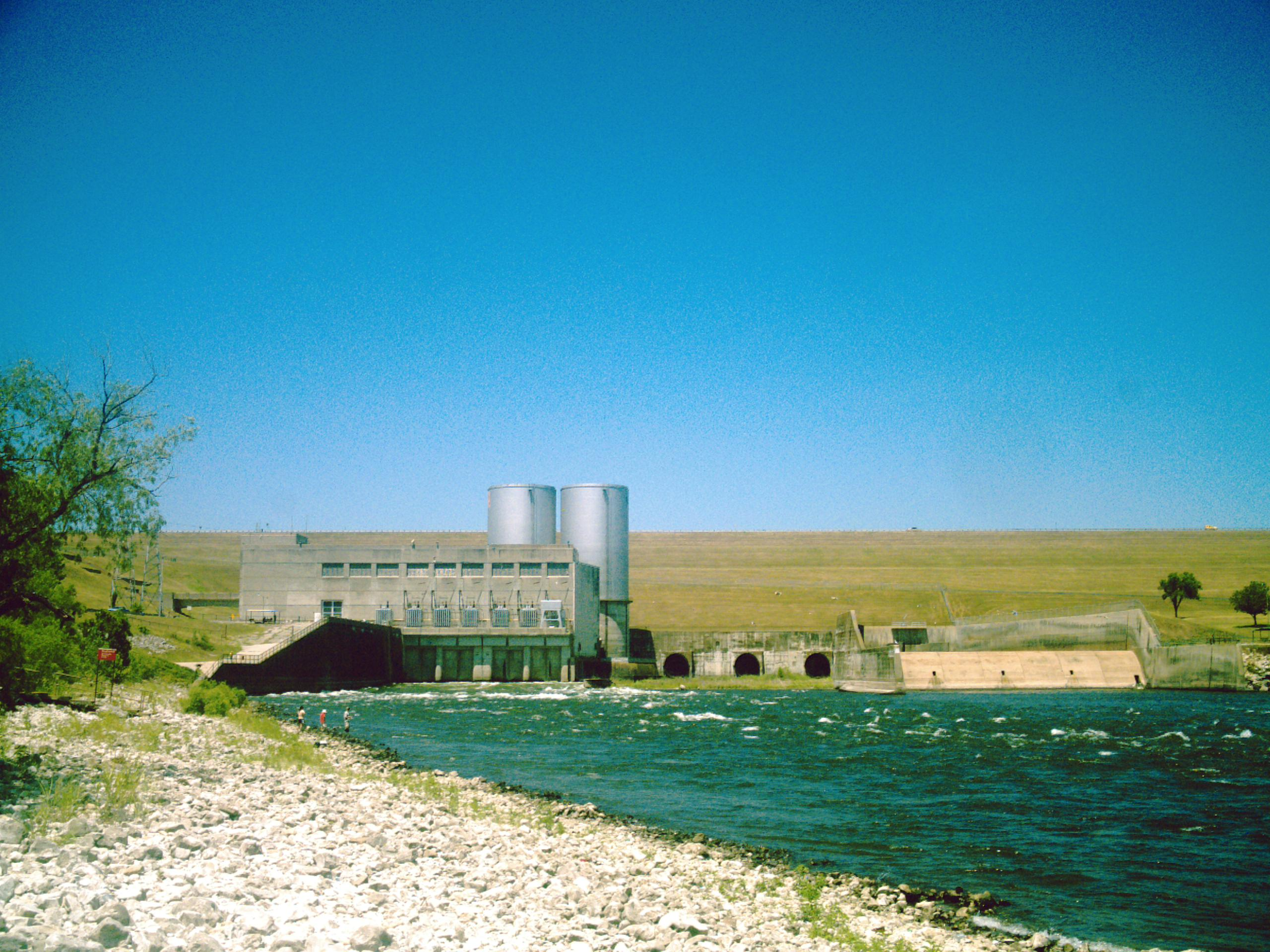

- Location within Oklahoma
- Country: United States
- Location: Bryan County, Oklahoma / Grayson County, Texas, US
- Coordinates: 33°49′5″N 96°34′20″W
- Status: Operational
- Owner: U.S. Army Corps of Engineers

Dam and spillways
- Type of dam: Earth-fill embankment
- Impounds: Red River of the South
- Height: 165 ft (50 m)
- Length: 15,200 ft (4,633 m) (not including levees)

Reservoir
- Creates: Lake Texoma
- Total capacity: 2,525,568 acre-feet (3.115242×10^{9} m^{3})
- Surface area: 89,000 acres (36,000 ha)

Power Station
- Commission date: 2021
- Turbines: 2 x 49.5 MW Francis-type
- Installed capacity: 99 MW

Denison Dam, also known as Lake Texoma Dam, is a dam located on the Red River between Texas and Oklahoma that impounds Lake Texoma. The purpose of the dam is flood control, water supply, hydroelectric power production, river regulation, navigation and recreation. It was also designated by the American Society of Civil Engineers as a National Historic Civil Engineering Landmark in 1993.

== History ==
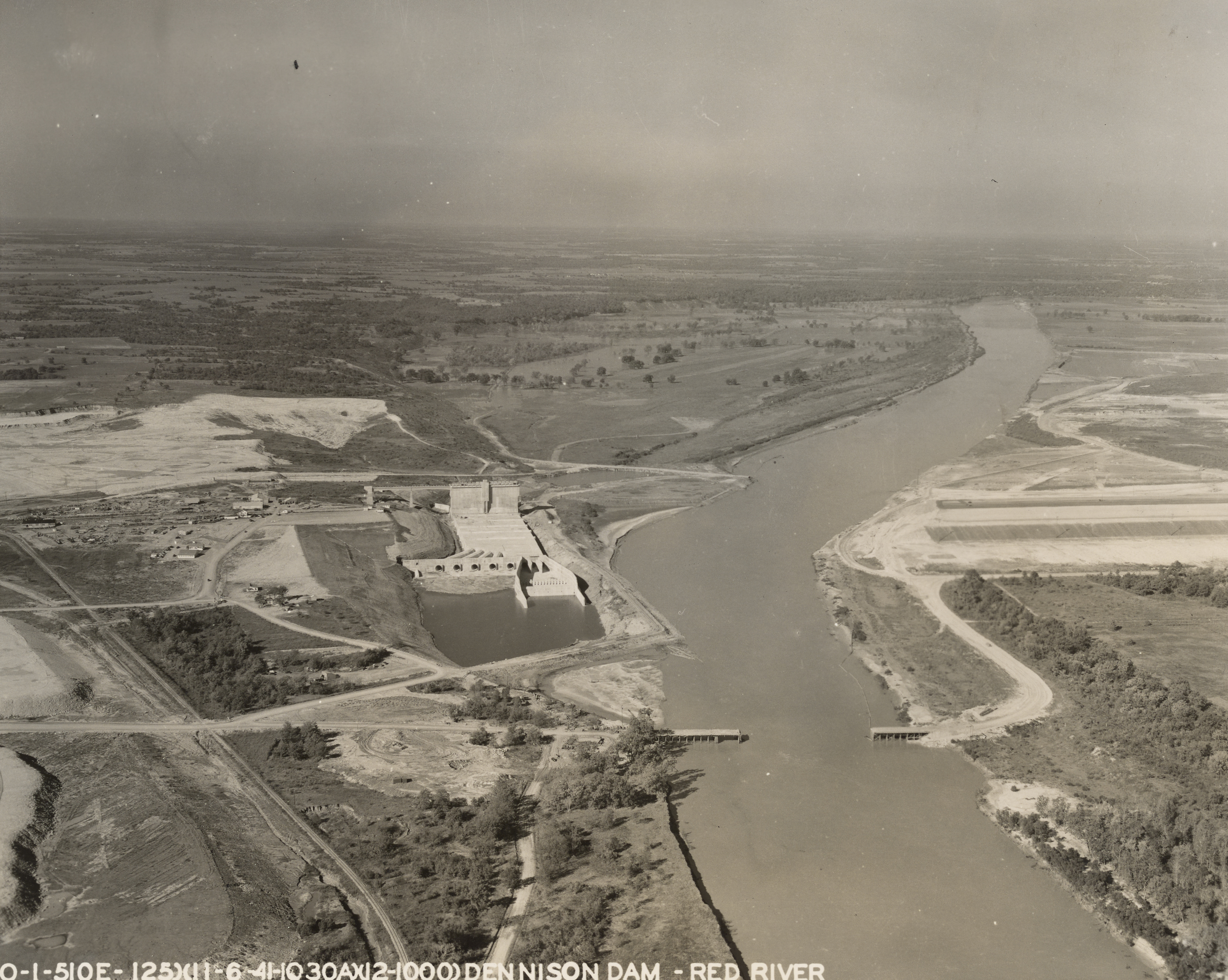
Dam under construction, 1941

Completed in 1943 primarily as a flood control project, it was at the time the "largest rolled-earth fill dam in the world". Only five times has the lake reached the dam's spillway at a height of 640 feet (200 m) above sea level: 1957, 1990, 2007, and twice in 2015. It takes its name from Denison, Texas, just downriver from the dam face.

Denison Dam contains a total of 18.8 million cubic yards (14,000,000 m³) of rolled-earth fill. It produces roughly 250,000 megawatt hours of electricity per year, while Lake Texoma provides nearly 125,000 acre-feet (154,000,000 m^{3}) of water storage for local communities under five permanent contracts.

In addition to two federally managed wildlife-refuge areas, Denison Dam has made possible 47 recreational areas managed by the U.S. Army Corps of Engineers, two state parks -- one in Oklahoma and one in Texas -- as well as 80,000 acres (32,000 ha) of open public land used for hunting.

[...] General Lucius D. Clay was the principal manager of the project.

Oklahoma State Highway 91 and, to a lesser extent, Texas State Highway 91 cross over the dam.

German prisoners of war from Rommel's Afrika Korps were used in the construction of the Denison Dam and Lake Texoma during World War II. They performed non-war-related work such as clearing trees, lining drainage ditches, and building a bathroom facility. They also helped clear more than 7,000 acres for the lake. 4

POWs were housed in camps in Tishomingo and Powell, Oklahoma.

The government paid $1.50 per day per prisoner, and the POWs received 80 cents in canteen coupons. The difference went to the federal treasury to pay for the POW program.
