= Achille, Oklahoma =

Town in Oklahoma, US

- Town
- Location in Oklahoma Achille, Oklahoma (the United States)
- Coordinates: 33°50′07″N 96°23′21″W
- Country: United States
- State: Oklahoma
- County: Bryan

Government
  - Type: Mayor–council

Area
  - Total: 0.44 sq mi (1.15 km^{2})
  - Land: 0.44 sq mi (1.15 km^{2})
  - Water: 0 sq mi (0.00 km^{2})
- Elevation: 669 ft (204 m)

Population (2020)
  - Total: 398
  - Density: 893.5/sq mi (344.97/km^{2})
- Time zone: UTC-6 (Central (CST))
  - Summer (DST): UTC-5 (CDT)
- ZIP code: 74720
- Area code: 580
- FIPS code: 40-00100
- GNIS feature ID: 2412332
- Website: townofachille.org

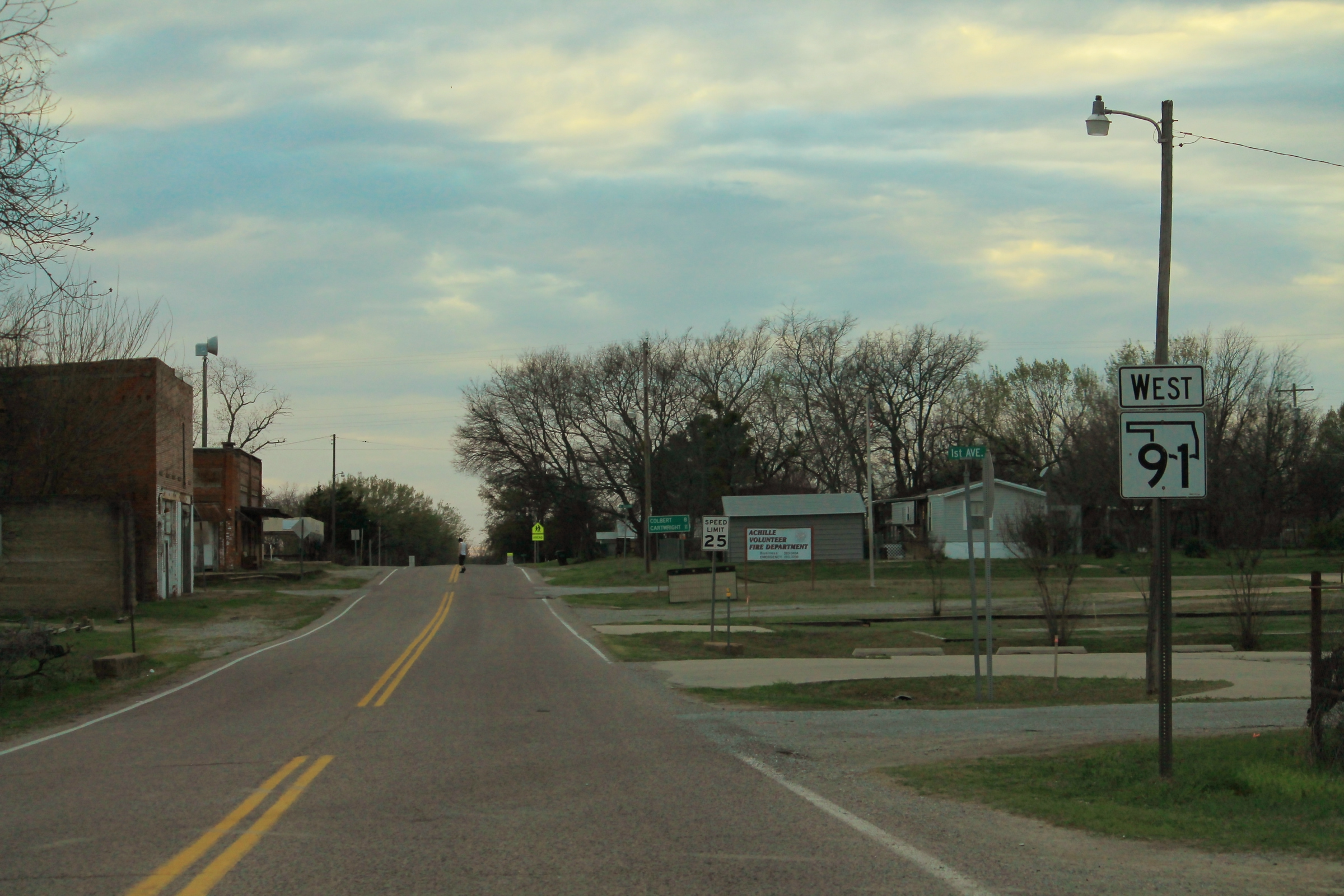
Westbound OK-91 in Achille

Achille is a town in Bryan County, Oklahoma, United States. As of the 2020 census, the community had 398 residents. The town's name is derived from a Cherokee language word, atsila, meaning "fire".

== History ==
The area that would become Achille was originally part of the Chickasaw Nation in Indian Territory. The Bloomfield Academy for Chickasaw girls was located 3 miles (4.8 km) southeast of present-day Achille from 1853 until 1914. Cherokee refugees located to the area during the American Civil War and called it atsila, meaning "fire".

The Missouri, Oklahoma and Gulf Railway built a line that crossed the region in 1908 and a post office was established in the community in 1910.

The community grew from an estimated population of 50 to 500 in 1920. The town's population declined to 294 in 1960 and reached a peak number of 506 in 2000.

== Geography ==
According to the United States Census Bureau, the town has a total area of 0.4 square miles (1.0 km^{2}), all land.

== Economy ==
The Choctaw Nation of Oklahoma headquarters, casinos, and other operations are located in nearby Durant and serve as a major employer in the region. Agriculture and tourism are both important industries.

== Demographics ==
Historical population
| Census | Pop. | Note | %± |
|---|---|---|---|
| 1920 | 500 | | — |
| 1930 | 383 | | −23.4% |
| 1940 | 356 | | −7.0% |
| 1950 | 383 | | 7.6% |
| 1960 | 294 | | −23.2% |
| 1970 | 382 | | 29.9% |
| 2000 | 506 | | — |
| 2010 | 492 | | −2.8% |
| 2020 | 398 | | −19.1% |
U.S. Decennial Census

=== 2020 census ===
As of the 2020 census, Achille had a population of 398. The median age was 46.5 years. 21.4% of residents were under the age of 18 and 24.4% of residents were 65 years of age or older. For every 100 females there were 97.0 males, and for every 100 females age 18 and over there were 88.6 males age 18 and over.

0.0% of residents lived in urban areas, while 100.0% lived in rural areas.

There were 173 households in Achille, of which 31.2% had children under the age of 18 living in them. Of all households, 39.9% were married-couple households, 21.4% were households with a male householder and no spouse or partner present, and 34.1% were households with a female householder and no spouse or partner present. About 26.0% of all households were made up of individuals and 11.0% had someone living alone who was 65 years of age or older.

There were 204 housing units, of which 15.2% were vacant. The homeowner vacancy rate was 0.0% and the rental vacancy rate was 18.9%.

Racial composition as of the 2020 census
| Race | Number | Percent |
|---|---|---|
| White | 286 | 71.9% |
| Black or African American | 5 | 1.3% |
| American Indian and Alaska Native | 59 | 14.8% |
| Asian | 0 | 0.0% |
| Native Hawaiian and Other Pacific Islander | 0 | 0.0% |
| Some other race | 4 | 1.0% |
| Two or more races | 44 | 11.1% |
| Hispanic or Latino (of any race) | 11 | 2.8% |

=== 2010 census ===
As of the census of 2010, there were 492 people living in the town. The population density was 1,230 inhabitants per square mile (470/km^{2}). There were 213 housing units at an average density of 552 per square mile (213/km^{2}). The racial makeup of the town was 71.34% White, 0.20% African American, 22.33% Native American, 0.40% Asian, 0.40% from other races, and 5.34% from two or more races. Hispanic or Latino people of any race were 0.59% of the population.

There were 188 households, out of which 63 (33.5%) included children under the age of 18, 82 (43.6%) were married couples living together, 36 (19.1%) consisted of a female householder with no husband present, 16 (8.5%) consisted of a male householder with no wife present, and 54 (28.7%) were non-families. Households made up of a single individual living alone accounted for 46 (24.5%) of households, and 58 (30.9%) households consisted of someone living alone who was 65 years of age or older. The average household size was 2.62 and the average family size was 3.10.

In the town, the population was spread out, with 25% under the age of 18, 10% from 18 to 24, 27.6% from 25 to 44, 22.6% from 45 to 64, and 14.8% who were 65 years of age or older. The median age was 36.8 years. For every 100 females, there were 95.4 males. For every 100 females age 18 and over, there were 91.5 males.

== Controversies ==
During his first term as mayor, in 2017, David Northcutt was investigated for firing a shot toward the ground in an argument with his boyfriend, and eventually resigned.

On October 28, 2018, current Achille Mayor David Northcutt, was arrested with an accomplice, Joshua Doughty, for first-degree burglary and methamphetamine possession charges. Northcutt was released after posting $10,000 bail.

In December 2018, Achille Councilman Lynn Chambers was arrested and charged along with four others, for methamphetamine trafficking and gun possession while committing a felony. 200 grams of methamphetamine, two pounds of marijuana and several guns were discovered by police. Child endangerment charges were being considered, as children were living at the location.

In 2019, items including guns, drugs, and cash that had been seized by the Achille Police went missing from the police evidence locker, prompting an investigation by the Oklahoma State Bureau of Investigation. Police Chief Chris Watson had handed the key to the evidence locker to the town's Board of Trustees shortly before the breach, after having been suspended and then fired by the board. "I cannot say that I am surprised because that entire city council is corrupt to the core", said Watson.

== Education ==
Achille is served by the Achille Independent School District.

== Notable person ==
- While not born in the town, country singer and actor Gene Autry was partially raised in Achille.
