= Chickasaw Nation elections =

Chickasaw Nation elections collects the results of all elections in the domestic dependent Chickasaw Nation of southern Oklahoma, United States. Almost all elections in the Chickasaw nation at present are officially nonpartisan.

== Process ==
If unopposed then elected by one vote margin as filing for office counts as a vote

== Public response ==
The elections have been criticized for having such low turnout.

== 1971 ==
In 1971 Governor Overton James was the first elected leader for the Chickasaw Nation since 1904.

== 1983 ==
=== Governor ===
1986 Chickasaw Nation governor election
Party	Candidate	Votes	%
Nonpartisan	Overton James/Bill Anoatubby (Incumbent)	1,502	60.03%
Nonpartisan	Bob Imotichey/ Bill Wade	639	25.53%
Nonpartisan	Cy Harris/J.D. Leslie	243	9.67%
Nonpartisan	Doug Hatton/Duane McClure	116	4.63%
Turnout		2502	100.00%

=== Judicial ===
1983 Chickasaw Nation Supreme Court Seat 1
Party	Candidate	Votes	%
Nonpartisan	Robert Keel	1,098	67.17%
Nonpartisan	Robert Cheadle	1,235	32.83%
Total votes		546	100.0%

1983 Chickasaw Nation Supreme Court Seat 2
Party	Candidate	Votes	%
Nonpartisan	Dr. Scott Colbert	1,163	51.32%
Nonpartisan	Edward Brown	1,103	48.67%
Total votes		2,266	100.0%

1983 Chickasaw Nation Supreme Court Seat 3
Party	Candidate	Votes	%
Nonpartisan	Barney Abbott	1	100%
Total votes		1	100%

=== Legislature ===
==== Pontotoc District Seat 1 ====
1983 Chickasaw Nation election Pontotoc District Seat 1
Party	Candidate	Votes	%
Nonpartisan	Jess Green	449	54.68%
Nonpartisan	Geraldine Greenwood	283	34.47%
Nonpartisan	Gerald Hatton	89	10.84%
Total votes		821	100.0%

==== Pontotoc District Seat 2 ====
1983 Chickasaw Nation election Pontotoc District Seat 2
Party	Candidate	Votes	%
Nonpartisan	Lorene Greenwood	1	100%
Total votes		1	100%

==== Pontotoc District Seat 3 ====
1983 Chickasaw Nation election Pontotoc District Seat 3
Party	Candidate	Votes	%
Nonpartisan	Overton "Buck" Cheadle	470	56.76%
Nonpartisan	Jerry Imotichey	229	27.65%
Nonpartisan	Darlene Chambers	129	15.57%
Total votes		828	100.0%

==== Pontotoc District Seat 4 ====
1983 Chickasaw Nation election Pontotoc District Seat 4
Party	Candidate	Votes	%
Nonpartisan	Robert Stephens	527	56.9%
Nonpartisan	Wilson Brown	528	43.1%
Total votes		1,055	100.0%

==== Pontotoc District Seat 5 ====
1983 Chickasaw Nation election Pontotoc District Seat 5
Party	Candidate	Votes	%
Nonpartisan	Joe Kent Abbott	435	56.9%
Nonpartisan	Jerome Benton	299	43.1%
Total votes		546	100.0%

==== Pontotoc District Seat 6 ====
1983 Chickasaw Nation election Pontotoc District Seat 6
Party	Candidate	Votes	%
Nonpartisan	Gene Underwood	708	100%
Total votes			100

==== Panola District Seat 1 ====
1983 Chickasaw Nation election Panola District Seat 1
Party	Candidate	Votes	%
Nonpartisan	Rena Lou Duncan	80	56.9%
Nonpartisan	Deborah Tally	54	43.1%
Total votes		546	100.0%

==== Pickens District Seat 1 ====
1983 Chickasaw Nation election Pickens District Seat 1
Party	Candidate	Votes	%
Nonpartisan	Harold Hensley	214	56.9%
Nonpartisan	Kirkland Perry	207	43.1%
Total votes		546	100.0%

==== Pickens District Seat 2 ====
1983 Chickasaw Nation Pickens District Seat 2
Party	Candidate	Votes	%
Nonpartisan	T.S. Colbert	124	32.81%
Nonpartisan	Pearl Kiazar Scott	114	24.53%
Nonpartisan	Stanford Wade	56	21.63%
Nonpartisan	Emil J. Farve Scott	36	21.03%
Turnout		Unknown	100.00%

===== Runoff =====
1983 Chickasaw Nation election Tishomingo District Seat 3 runoff
Party	Candidate	Votes	%
Nonpartisan	T.S. Colbert	201	56.9%
Nonpartisan	Pearl Kiazar Scott	189	43.1%
Total votes		546	100.0%

==== Pickens District Seat 3 ====
1983 Chickasaw Nation election Pickens District Seat 3
Party	Candidate	Votes	%
Nonpartisan	Henry Pratt	360	100%
Total votes			100

==== Tishomingo District Seat 1 ====
1983 Chickasaw Nation election Tishomingo District Seat 1
Party	Candidate	Votes	%
Nonpartisan	Wilson Seawright	201	56.9%
Nonpartisan	Euel Moore	189	43.1%
Total votes		546	100.0%

==== Tishomingo District Seat 2 ====
1983 Chickasaw Nation election Tishomingo District Seat 2
Party	Candidate	Votes	%
Nonpartisan	Timothy K. Colbert	342	100%
Total votes			100

==== Tishomingo District Seat 3 ====
1983 Chickasaw Nation election Tishomingo District Seat 3
Party	Candidate	Votes	%
Nonpartisan	Dawatha Easterling	155	%
Nonpartisan	Imogene Whelchel	130	26.8%
Nonpartisan	Cecil Underwood	107	23.23%
Total votes		Unknown	100.0%

===== Runoff =====
1983 Chickasaw Nation election Tishomingo District Seat 3 runoff
Party	Candidate	Votes	%
Nonpartisan	Dawatha Easterling	201	56.9%
Nonpartisan	Imogene Whelchel	189	43.1%
Total votes		546	100.0%

=== Constitutional referendum ===
Shall the office of Governor be limited to two two-year terms in any six-year period.

Question 1
Choice	Votes	%
No	12,58	
Yes	1,138	
Total Votes		100%

Shall the office of Lt Governor be abolished.

Question 2
Choice	Votes	%
No	1,640	
Yes	748	
Total Votes		100%

Shall the minimum blood quantum of 1/4 for position of Governor be abolished

Question 3
Choice	Votes	%
No	1,590	
Yes	741	
Total Votes		100%

Shall the council, the legislative branch, fix all salaries of all employees?

Question 4
Choice	Votes	%
No	1,218	
Yes	1,162	
Total Votes		100%

Shall the seat of government be moved to Tishomingo

Question 5
Choice	Votes	%
No	1,732	
Yes	654	
Total Votes		100%

Shall tribal judges be elected?

Question 6
Choice	Votes	%
Yes	1,443	
No	934	
Total Votes		100%

Shall vacancies in elective office be filled by special election instead of appointment by governor with legislative approval?

Question 7
Choice	Votes	%
Yes	1,498	
No	848	
Total Votes		100%

A. Shall the Tribal Council consist of only members who have been residents of the Chickasaw nation for one year preceding the election as provided in the 1867 Constitution. or B. Shal some members of the Tribal Council be non-residents of the Chickasaw nation as provided in the 1979 constitution?

Question 8
Choice	Votes	%
A	1,743	
B	639	
Total Votes		100%

A. In order to be eligible to run for office of governor shall a person be required to have been a resident within the boundaries of the Chickasaw Nation for one year prior to his or her election as provided in the 1867 constitution, or B. in order to be eligible to run for the office of governor shall a person be required to have been a resident of the state of Oklahoma for two or more years prior to his or her election as provided in the 1979 constitution.

Question 9
Choice	Votes	%
A	1,686	
B	701	
Total Votes		100%

Shall the boundaries of the legislative district for the Tribal Council be described by the metes and bounds description as set out in the 1867 constitution or B. Shall the eleven counties which describe the Chickasaw Nation as set out in the 1979 constitution constitute the boundaries of the legislative districts for the Tribal Council

Choice	Votes	%
A	1,583	
B	762	
Total Votes		100%

== 1984 ==
=== Judicial ===
seat 2

== 1988 ==
=== Judicial ===
1988 Chickasaw Nation Supreme Court Seat 2
Party	Candidate	Votes	%
Nonpartisan	Wilson Seawright	1,163	67.17%
Nonpartisan	Virginia (Keel) Sherwood	1,103	32.83%
Total votes		546	100.0%

== 1999 ==
=== Governor ===
1999 Chickasaw Nation governor election
Party	Candidate	Votes	%
Nonpartisan	Bill Anoatubby/Jefferson Keel (Incumbent)	Unknown	54.8 %
Nonpartisan	Wilson Seawright/Jerry Imotichey	Unknown	25.6 %
Nonpartisan	David E. Brown/Beverly Cravatt-Tallbird	Unknown	19.6 %
Total votes			100.0%

=== Legislature ===
==== Pontotoc District Seat 3 ====
1999 Chickasaw Nation Pontotoc District Seat 3 election
Party	Candidate	Votes	%
Nonpartisan	Lisa Johnson Billy (Incumbent)	Unknown	38.6%
Nonpartisan	Virginia Nail	Unknown	28.2%
Nonpartisan	Georgia Malone	Unknown	13.8%
Nonpartisan	Michael O. Brown	Unknown	11.6%
Nonpartisan	Patricia Sutton	Unknown	7.8%
Turnout		Unknown	100.00%

===== Runoff =====
1999 Chickasaw Nation Pontotoc District Seat 3 runoff election
Party	Candidate	Votes	%
Nonpartisan	Lisa Johnson Billy (Incumbent)	Unknown	Unknown
Nonpartisan	Virginia Nail	Unknown	Unknown
Total votes		546	100.0%

==== Pontotoc District 4 ====
1999 Chickasaw Nation Pontotoc District 4
Party	Candidate	Votes	%
Nonpartisan	Dean McManus (Incumbent)	Unknown	32.81%
Nonpartisan	Mary Jane Frazier Smith	Unknown	24.53%
Nonpartisan	Cindy R. Huston	Unknown	21.63%
Nonpartisan	Rodney Brown	Unknown	21.03%
Turnout		Unknown	100.00%

===== Runoff =====
1999 Chickasaw Nation Pontotoc District Seat 3 runoff election
Party	Candidate	Votes	%
Nonpartisan	Dean McManus (Incumbent)	Unknown	Unknown
Nonpartisan	Mary Jane Frazier Smith	Unknown	Unknown
Total votes		546	100.0%

==== Tishomingo District Seat 3 ====
1999 Chickasaw Nation election Tishomingo District Seat 3
Party	Candidate	Votes	%
Nonpartisan	Lisa Shephard (Incumbent)	Unknown	49.97%
Nonpartisan	Steven Woods	Unknown	26.8%
Nonpartisan	Rebecca Easterling Durington	Unknown	23.23%
Total votes		Unknown	100.0%

==== Pickens District Seat 3 ====
1999 Chickasaw Nation Pickens District Seat 3
Party	Candidate	Votes	%
Nonpartisan	Donna Hartman (Incumbent)	Unknown	48.01%
Nonpartisan	Roland E. Barrick	Unknown	19.08%
Nonpartisan	Clark Mitchell	Unknown	14.13%
Nonpartisan	Velma Castaneda	Unknown	9.49%
Nonpartisan	Mike Lidell	Unknown	8.57%
Turnout		Unknown	100.00%

===== Runoff =====
1999 Chickasaw Nation Pontotoc District Seat 3 runoff election
Party	Candidate	Votes	%
Nonpartisan	Donna Hartman (Incumbent)	Unknown	Unknown
Nonpartisan	Mary Jane Frazier Smith	Unknown	Unknown
Total votes		546	100.0%

== 2003 ==
Congressman Tom Cole questioned the missing ballets in the election

=== Governor ===
2003 Chickasaw Nation governor election
Party	Candidate	Votes	%
Nonpartisan	Bill Anoatubby/Jefferson Keel (Incumbent)	5,500	79.1%
Nonpartisan	Donna Hartman/William K. Kirtley	1,456	20.9%
Total votes		546	100.0%

=== Legislature ===
==== Pontotoc District Seat 1 ====
2003 Chickasaw Nation Pontotoc District Seat 1
Party	Candidate	Votes	%
Nonpartisan	Holly Easterling	1,633	56.9%
Nonpartisan	Mooniene Ogee (Incumbent)	1,236	43.1%
Total votes		546	100.0%

==== Pontotoc District Seat 2 ====
2003 Chickasaw Nation Pontotoc District Seat 2
Party	Candidate	Votes	%
Nonpartisan	Judy Goforth Parker (Incumbent)	1,973	68.2%
Nonpartisan	Jerry Imotichey	920	31.8%
Total votes		546	100.0%

==== Pickens District Seat 1 ====
2003 Chickasaw Nation Pickens District Seat 1
Party	Candidate	Votes	%
Nonpartisan	Wilson Seawright (Incumbent)	1,084	56.9 %
Nonpartisan	Randy Neasbitt	822	43.1%
Total votes		546	100.0%

==== Pickens District Seat 4 ====
2003 Chickasaw Nation Pickens District Seat 4
Party	Candidate	Votes	%
Nonpartisan	Wanda Blackwood Scott (Incumbent)	1,102	56.6%
Nonpartisan	Jessie M. Lynch	844	43.4%
Total votes		546	100.0%

==== Pontotoc District Seat 2 ====
2003 Chickasaw Nation Pontotoc District Seat 2
Party	Candidate	Votes	%
Nonpartisan	Scott Colbert (Incumbent)	860	54.1 %
Nonpartisan	Jimme Dale Sweat	731	45.9 %
Total votes		546	100.0%

=== Judicial ===
2003 Chickasaw Nation Judicial special election
Party	Candidate	Votes	%
Nonpartisan	Beth Alexander (Incumbent)		44%
Nonpartisan	Elen Flowers		30%
Nonpartisan	Rose Duncan		25%
Total votes			100.0%

== 2004 ==
=== Legislature ===
==== Panola District Seat 1 ====
2004 Chickasaw Nation election Panola District 1
Party	Candidate	Votes	%
Nonpartisan	Beth Alexander (Incumbent)		44%
Nonpartisan	Elen Flowers		30%
Nonpartisan	Rose Duncan		25%
Total votes			100.0%

===== Runoff =====
2004 Chickasaw Nation runoff election Panola District 1
Party	Candidate	Votes	%
Nonpartisan	Beth Alexander (Incumbent)	308	56.51%
Nonpartisan	Elen Flowers	238	43.49%
Total votes		546	100.0%

==== Pontotoc District Seat 5 ====
2004 Chickasaw Nation election Pontotoc District Seat 5
Party	Candidate	Votes	%
Nonpartisan	Mary Jo Green (Incumbent)	1,850	60%
Nonpartisan	Rodney Brown	958	31%
Nonpartisan	Heath Allison	252	8%
Total votes		6,060	100.0%

==== Pickens District Seat 3 ====
2004 Chickasaw Nation election Pickens District Seat 3
Party	Candidate	Votes	%
Nonpartisan	Linda Briggs (Incumbent)	1,394	72%
Nonpartisan	Kathleen Whitefield	526	27%
Total votes		546	100.0%

==== Tishomingo District Seat 1 ====
2004 Chickasaw Nation election Tishomingo District Seat 1
Party	Candidate	Votes	%
Nonpartisan	Tim Colbert (Incumbent)		100%
Total votes			100

=== Judicial Seat 1 ===
2004 Chickasaw Nation Judicial election
Party	Candidate	Votes	%
Nonpartisan	Mark Holmes Colbert (Incumbent)		100%
Total votes			100

== 2005 ==
=== Legislature ===
==== Pontotoc District Seat 3 ====
2005 Chickasaw Nation Pontotoc District Seat 3 election
Party	Candidate	Votes	%
Nonpartisan	Melvin Burris (Incumbent)	1,149	40.25%
Nonpartisan	Mooniene Perry Ogee	776	27.18%
Nonpartisan	Toby Perkins	697	24.41%
Nonpartisan	Rodney Brown	233	8.16%
Turnout		2,855	100.00%

===== Runoff =====
2005 Chickasaw Nation Pontotoc District Seat 3 runoff election
Party	Candidate	Votes	%
Nonpartisan	Mooniene Perry Ogee	1,354	50.09%
Nonpartisan	Melvin Burris (Incumbent)	1,349	49.90%
Total votes		546	100.0%

==== Pontotoc District Seat 4 ====
2005 Chickasaw Nation election Pontotoc District Seat 4
Party	Candidate	Votes	%
Nonpartisan	Dean McManus (Incumbent)	2,004	70.79%
Nonpartisan	Heath Allison	827	29.21%
Total votes		546	100.0%

==== Pickens District Seat 2 ====
2005 Chickasaw Nation election Pickens District Seat 2
Party	Candidate	Votes	%
Nonpartisan	Mitch Sperry	1,015	50.80%
Nonpartisan	Donna Hartman (Incumbent)	983	49.20%
Total votes		546	100.0%

==== Tishomingo District Seat 3 ====
2005 Chickasaw Nation election Pickens District Seat 2
Party	Candidate	Votes	%
Nonpartisan	Steven E. Woods (Incumbent)	871	62.39%
Nonpartisan	Joe R. Orr	525	37.61%
Total votes		546	100.0%

=== Supreme Court Seat 3 ===
2005 Chickasaw Nation Supreme Court Seat 3 election
Party	Candidate	Votes	%
Nonpartisan	Cheri L. Bellefuille-Eldred (Incumbent)	4,364	67.17%
Nonpartisan	Wilma Pauline(Stout) Watson		32.83%
Total votes		546	100.0%

== 2006 ==
=== Legislature ===
==== Pontotoc District Seat 1 ====
2006 Chickasaw Nation Pontotoc District Seat 1
Party	Candidate	Votes	%
Nonpartisan	Holly Easterling (Incumbent)	2,002	65.73%
Nonpartisan	Dr Debra D. Vaughn	541	17.76%
Nonpartisan	Heath Allison	503	16.51%
Total votes		6,060	100.0%

==== Pontotoc District Seat 2 ====
2006 Chickasaw Nation Pontotoc District Seat 2 election
Party	Candidate	Votes	%
Nonpartisan	Scott Colbert (Incumbent)		100%
Total votes			100

==== Pontotoc District Seat 3 Special Election ====
2006 Chickasaw Nation election Pontotoc District Seat 3 Special Election
Party	Candidate	Votes	%
Nonpartisan	Katie Case	558	44%
Nonpartisan	Matthew Morgan	478	25%
Nonpartisan	Melvin Burris	447	25%
Nonpartisan	Dr. Debra Vaughn		25%
Nonpartisan	Jeannie Lunsford	262	25%
Nonpartisan	Carolyn Hill Nimmo	200	25%
Nonpartisan	Nancy Elliot	164	25%
Nonpartisan	Kay Colbert-Hall	147	25%
Nonpartisan	Robert Perry	145	25%
Nonpartisan	Norman Jean Cravatt-Prince	125	25%
Nonpartisan	Russ Stick	120	25%
Nonpartisan	Heath Allison	106	30%
Nonpartisan	Patricia A. Greenwood Cox	92	25%
Total votes			100.0%

===== Runoff =====
2006 Chickasaw Nation election Pontotoc District Seat 3 Special Runoff Election
Party	Candidate	Votes	%
Nonpartisan	Katie Case	1,731	%
Nonpartisan	Matthew Morgan	1,103	%
Total votes		546	100.0%

==== Pickens District Seat 1 ====
2006 Chickasaw Nation election Pickens District Seat 1
Party	Candidate	Votes	%
Nonpartisan	David Woerz	1,105	50.43%
Nonpartisan	Wilson Seawright (Incumbent)	1,086	49.57%
Total votes		546	100.0%

==== Pickens District Seat 4 ====
2006 Chickasaw Nation Pickens District Seat 4 election
Party	Candidate	Votes	%
Nonpartisan	Wanda Blackwood Tippit Scott (Incumbent)	894	39.79%
Nonpartisan	Sue Simmons	625	27.81%
Nonpartisan	Linda Blackwood Harris	505	22.47%
Nonpartisan	Sherri Sanders	223	9.92%
Turnout		2,855	100.00%

===== Runoff =====
2005 Chickasaw Nation Pontotoc District Seat 3 runoff election
Party	Candidate	Votes	%
Nonpartisan	Wanda Blackwood Tippit Scott (Incumbent)	967	51.22%
Nonpartisan	Sue Simmons	921	48.78%
Total votes		546	100.0%

==== Tishomingo District Seat 1 ====
2006 Chickasaw Nation Pontotoc District Seat 2 election
Party	Candidate	Votes	%
Nonpartisan	Dr Judy Goforth Parker (Incumbent)		100%
Total votes			100

=== Supreme Court Seat 2 ===
2006 Chickasaw Nation Supreme Court Seat 3 election
Party	Candidate	Votes	%
Nonpartisan	Barbara Ann Smith (Incumbent)	4,093	60.20%
Nonpartisan	Kathleen Whitefield Stoner	2,706	39.80%
Total votes		546	100.0%

== 2007 ==
=== Governor ===
2007 Chickasaw Nation Governor election
Party	Candidate	Votes	%
Nonpartisan	Bill Anoatubby/Jefferson Keel (Incumbent)		100%
Total votes			100

=== Legislature ===
==== Pontotoc District Seat 5 ====
2007 Chickasaw Nation Pontotoc District Seat 5
Party	Candidate	Votes	%
Nonpartisan	Mary Jo Green (Incumbent)	2,053	
Nonpartisan	Jeannie Coplin	540	%
Nonpartisan	James Page	236	%
Total votes		6,060	100.0%

==== Pickens District Seat 3 ====
2007 Chickasaw Nation Pickens District Seat 3
Party	Candidate	Votes	%
Nonpartisan	Linda Briggs (Incumbent)	1,773	%
Nonpartisan	Wilson Seawright	900	%
Total votes		546	100.0%

==== Panola District Seat 1 ====
2007 Chickasaw Nation Panola District Seat 1
Party	Candidate	Votes	%
Nonpartisan	Beth Alexander (Incumbent)	336	%
Nonpartisan	Beryl F. Sears	281	%
Total votes		546	100.0%

==== Tishomingo District Seat 2 ====
2007 Chickasaw Nation election Tishomingo District Seat 2
Party	Candidate	Votes	%
Nonpartisan	Tim Colbert (Incumbent)		100%
Total votes			100

=== Judicial ===
2007 Chickasaw Nation Judicial election
Party	Candidate	Votes	%
Nonpartisan	Mark Holmes Colbert (Incumbent)		100%
Total votes			100

== 2008 ==
=== Legislature ===
==== Pontotoc District Seat 3 ====
2008 Chickasaw Nation Pontotoc District Seat 3
Party	Candidate	Votes	%
Nonpartisan	Katie Case (Incumbent)	1,616	51%
Nonpartisan	Nancy Elliot	1,559	49%
Total votes		546	100.0%

==== Pontotoc District Seat 4 ====
2008 Chickasaw Nation election Pontotoc District Seat 4
Party	Candidate	Votes	%
Nonpartisan	Dean McManus (Incumbent)		100%
Total votes			100

==== Pickens District Seat 2 ====
2008 Chickasaw Nation Pickens District Seat 2
Party	Candidate	Votes	%
Nonpartisan	Donna Hartman (Incumbent)	901	45%
Nonpartisan	Connie Barker	729	37%
Nonpartisan	Charles F. Lewis	361	18%
Total votes		6,060	100.0%

===== Runoff =====
2008 Chickasaw Nation Pickens District Seat 2 runoff election
Party	Candidate	Votes	%
Nonpartisan	Connie Barker	1,205	57%
Nonpartisan	Donna Hartman (Incumbent)	900	43%
Total votes		546	100.0%

==== Tishomingo District Seat 3 ====
2008 Chickasaw Nation election Tishomingo District Seat 3
Party	Candidate	Votes	%
Nonpartisan	Steven E. Wood (Incumbent)		100%
Total votes			100

=== Judicial ===
2008 Chickasaw Nation Judicial election Seat 3
Party	Candidate	Votes	%
Nonpartisan	Cheri L. Bellefuille-Eldred (Incumbent)		100%
Total votes			100

== 2009 ==
=== Legislature ===
==== Pontotoc District Seat 1 ====
2009 Chickasaw Nation Pontotoc District Seat 1
Party	Candidate	Votes	%
Nonpartisan	Holly M. Easterling (Incumbent)	2,126	71.48%
Nonpartisan	Pattie Howell	848	28.51%
Total votes		546	100.0%

==== Pontotoc District Seat 2 ====
2009 Chickasaw Nation Pontotoc District Seat 2
Party	Candidate	Votes	%
Nonpartisan	Nancy Elliott	1,733	57.74%
Nonpartisan	Leon D. Brown	595	18.82%
Nonpartisan	Todd Griffith	462	15.39%
Nonpartisan	Sandra "Renee" Gibson	211	7.03%
Turnout		2,855	100.00%

==== Pickens District Seat 1 ====
2009 Chickasaw Nation Pickens District Seat 1
Party	Candidate	Votes	%
Nonpartisan	David Woerz (Incumbent)	1,286	55.40%
Nonpartisan	Leslie Larsen Hicks	528	22.74%
Nonpartisan	Mike Watson	507	21.84%
Total votes		6,060	100.0%

==== Pickens District Seat 4 ====
2009 Chickasaw Nation Pickens District Seat 4
Party	Candidate	Votes	%
Nonpartisan	Shana Tate Hamond	1,305	56.69%
Nonpartisan	Wanda Blackwood Tippit Scott (Incumbent)	997	43.31%
Total votes		546	100.0%

==== Tishomingo District Seat 1 ====
2009 Chickasaw Nation election Tishomingo District Seat 1
Party	Candidate	Votes	%
Nonpartisan	Scott Colbert (Incumbent)		100%
Total votes			100

=== Judicial ===
2009 Chickasaw Nation Judicial election Seat 2
Party	Candidate	Votes	%
Nonpartisan	Barbara Ann Smith (Incumbent)		100%
Total votes			100

== 2010 ==
=== Legislature ===
==== Tishomingo District Seat 2 ====
2010 Chickasaw Nation election Tishomingo District Seat 2
Party	Candidate	Votes	%
Nonpartisan	Tim Colbert (Incumbent)		100%
Total votes			100

==== Pontotoc District Seat 1 Special Election ====
Source:

==== Pontotoc District Seat 5 ====
2010 Chickasaw Nation Pontotoc District Seat 5
Party	Candidate	Votes	%
Nonpartisan	Mary Jo Green (Incumbent)	1,943	62%
Nonpartisan	Mark Johnson	814	26%
Nonpartisan	Todd Griffith	361	12%
Total votes		6,060	100.0%

==== Pickens District Seat 3 ====
2010 Chickasaw Nation Pickens District Seat 3
Party	Candidate	Votes	%
Nonpartisan	Linda Briggs (Incumbent)	1,280	61%
Nonpartisan	Mark Watson	542	26%
Nonpartisan	Daniel Worcester	262	13%
Total votes		6,060	100.0%

==== Panola District Seat 1 ====
2010 Chickasaw Nation Panola District Seat 1
Party	Candidate	Votes	%
Nonpartisan	Beth Alexander (Incumbent)	336	48%
Nonpartisan	Beryl F. Sears.	312	44%
Nonpartisan	Ellen Flowers	54	8%
Total votes		6,060	100.0%

===== Runoff =====
2010 Chickasaw Nation Panola District Seat 1 runoff election
Party	Candidate	Votes	%
Nonpartisan	Beth Alexander (Incumbent)	464	57.5%
Nonpartisan	Beryl F. Sears.	342	42.5%
Total votes		546	100.0%

=== Judicial ===
2010 Chickasaw Nation Judicial election Seat 1
Party	Candidate	Votes	%
Nonpartisan	Mark Holmes Colbert (Incumbent)	4,835	71%
Nonpartisan	Jeremy D. Oliver	2,014	29%
Total votes		546	100.0%

== 2011 ==
=== Governor ===
2011 Chickasaw Nation Governor election
Party	Candidate	Votes	%
Nonpartisan	Bill Anoatubby/Jefferson Keel (Incumbent)		100%
Total votes			100

=== Legislature ===
==== Pontotoc District Seat 3 ====
2011 Chickasaw Nation Pontotoc District Seat 3
Party	Candidate	Votes	%
Nonpartisan	Katie Case (Incumbent)	2,163	61.59%
Nonpartisan	Mary Ruth Barnes	922	26.25%
Nonpartisan	Barbara Allen Wilson	427	12.16%
Total votes		6,060	100.0%

==== Pontotoc District Seat 4 ====
2011 Chickasaw nation Pontotoc District Seat 4 election
Party	Candidate	Votes	%
Nonpartisan	Dean McManus (Incumbent)	2,260	64.79%
Nonpartisan	Mathew Scott Gore	1,228	35.21%
Total votes		546	100.0%

==== Pickens District Seat 2 ====
2011 Chickasaw nation Pickens District Seat 2
Party	Candidate	Votes	%
Nonpartisan	Connie Barker (Incumbent)	1,400	66.92%
Nonpartisan	Mike Watson	692	33.08%
Total votes		546	100.0%

==== Tishomingo District Seat 3 ====
2011 Chickasaw Nation Tishomingo District Seat 3
Party	Candidate	Votes	%
Nonpartisan	Steve E. Woods	1,061	68.41%
Nonpartisan	Melanie Peden	271	17.47%
Nonpartisan	Joyce L. Wesley	219	14.12%
Total votes		6,060	100.0%

=== Judicial ===
2011 Chickasaw Nation Judicial election Seat 3
Party	Candidate	Votes	%
Nonpartisan	Cheri L. Bellefuille-Eldred (Incumbent)		100%
Total votes			100

== 2012 ==
=== Legislature ===
==== Pontotoc District Seat 1 ====
2012 Chickasaw nation Pontotoc District Seat 1
Party	Candidate	Votes	%
Nonpartisan	Toby Perkins (Incumbent)	2,344	75.42%
Nonpartisan	Matthew Scott Gore	764	24.58%
Total votes		546	100.0%

==== Pontotoc District Seat 2 ====
2012 Chickasaw Nation election Pontotoc District Seat 2
Party	Candidate	Votes	%
Nonpartisan	Nancy Elliott (Incumbent)		100%
Total votes			100

==== Pickens District Seat 1 ====
2012 Chickasaw nation Pickens District Seat 1
Party	Candidate	Votes	%
Nonpartisan	David Woerz (Incumbent)	1,596	75.18%
Nonpartisan	Mike Watson	527	24.82%
Total votes		546	100.0%

==== Pickens District Seat 4 ====
2012 Chickasaw Nation election Pickens District Seat 4
Party	Candidate	Votes	%
Nonpartisan	Shana Tate Hamond (Incumbent)		100%
Total votes			100

==== Tishomingo District Seat 1 ====
2012 Chickasaw nation Tishomingo District Seat 1
Party	Candidate	Votes	%
Nonpartisan	Scott Wood (Incumbent)	1,059	59.80%
Nonpartisan	D. Scott Colbert	712	40.20%
Total votes		546	100.0%

=== Judicial ===
2012 Chickasaw Nation Judicial election Seat 2
Party	Candidate	Votes	%
Nonpartisan	Barbara Ann Smith (Incumbent)		100%
Total votes			100

== 2013 ==
=== Legislature ===
==== Pontotoc District Seat 5 ====
2013 Chickasaw Nation Pontotoc District Seat 5
Party	Candidate	Votes	%
Nonpartisan	Mary Jo Green (Incumbent)	1,960	62%
Nonpartisan	Mark Allen Johnson	818	26%
Nonpartisan	Linda Greenwood	373	12%
Total votes		6,060	100.0%

==== Pickens District Seat 3 ====
2013 Chickasaw nation Perkins District Seat 3
Party	Candidate	Votes	%
Nonpartisan	Linda Briggs (Incumbent)	1,183	57%
Nonpartisan	Michael Watson	905	43%
Total votes		546	100.0%

==== Panola District Seat 1 ====
2013 Chickasaw Nation election Panola District Seat 1
Party	Candidate	Votes	%
Nonpartisan	Beth Alexander (Incumbent)		100%
Total votes			100

==== Tishomingo District Seat 2 ====
2013 Chickasaw Nation election Tishomingo District Seat 2
Party	Candidate	Votes	%
Nonpartisan	Timothy K. Colbert (Incumbent)		100%
Total votes			100

=== Judicial ===
2013 Chickasaw Nation Judicial election Seat 1
Party	Candidate	Votes	%
Nonpartisan	Mark Holmes Colbert (Incumbent)		100%
Total votes			100

== 2014 ==
=== Legislature ===
==== Pontotoc District Seat 4 ====
2014 Chickasaw Nation election Pontotoc District Seat 4
Party	Candidate	Votes	%
Nonpartisan	Dean McManus (Incumbent)		100%
Total votes			100

==== Pontotoc District Seat 5 ====
2014 Chickasaw nation Pontotoc District Seat 5
Party	Candidate	Votes	%
Nonpartisan	Katie Case (Incumbent)	1,805	51%
Nonpartisan	Dr. Karen Goodnight	1,703	49%
Total votes		546	100.0%

==== Pickens District Seat 2 ====
2014 Chickasaw Nation Pickens District Seat 2
Party	Candidate	Votes	%
Nonpartisan	Connie Barker (Incumbent)	1,360	64%
Nonpartisan	Michael T. Watson	540	25%
Nonpartisan	Wanda Blackwood Tippit Scott	231	11%
Total votes		6,060	100.0%

==== Tishomingo District Seat 3 ====
2014 Chickasaw nation Tishomingo District Seat 3
Party	Candidate	Votes	%
Nonpartisan	Steven Woods (Incumbent)	1,025	66%
Nonpartisan	Wes Harden	524	34%
Total votes		546	100.0%

=== Judicial ===
2014 Chickasaw Nation Judicial election Seat 3
Party	Candidate	Votes	%
Nonpartisan	Cheri L. Bellefuille-Eldred (Incumbent)		100%
Total votes			100

== 2015 ==
=== Governor ===
2015 Chickasaw Nation Governor election
Party	Candidate	Votes	%
Nonpartisan	Bill Anoatubby/Jefferson Keel (Incumbent)		100%
Total votes			100

=== Legislature ===
==== Pontotoc District Seat 1 ====
2015 Chickasaw Nation Pontotoc District Seat 1
Party	Candidate	Votes	%
Nonpartisan	Toby Perkins (Incumbent)	2,516	73%
Nonpartisan	Mary Holden-Nordwall	627	18%
Nonpartisan	Oscar W. Gore	300	9%
Total votes		6,060	100.0%

==== Pontotoc District Seat 2 ====
2015 Chickasaw Nation election Pontotoc District Seat 2
Party	Candidate	Votes	%
Nonpartisan	Nancy Elliott (Incumbent)		100%
Total votes			100

==== Pickens District Seat 1 ====
2015 Chickasaw nation Pickens District Seat 1
Party	Candidate	Votes	%
Nonpartisan	David Woerz (Incumbent)	1,486	69%
Nonpartisan	Mike Watson	677	31%
Total votes		546	100.0%

==== Pickens District Seat 4 ====
2015 Chickasaw Nation election Pickens District Seat 4
Party	Candidate	Votes	%
Nonpartisan	Shana Tate Hammond (Incumbent)		100%
Total votes			100

==== Tishomingo District Seat 1 ====
2015 Chickasaw Nation election Tishomingo District Seat 1
Party	Candidate	Votes	%
Nonpartisan	Scott Wood (Incumbent)		100%
Total votes			100

=== Judicial ===
2015 Chickasaw Nation Judicial election Seat 2
Party	Candidate	Votes	%
Nonpartisan	Linda English Weeks	5,138	69%
Nonpartisan	Barbara Ann Smith (Incumbent)	2,356	31%
Total votes		546	100.0%

== 2016 ==
=== Legislature ===
==== Pickens District Seat 3 ====
2016 Chickasaw Nation Pickens District Seat 3
Party	Candidate	Votes	%
Nonpartisan	Linda Briggs (Incumbent)	1,592	73%
Nonpartisan	Michael T. Watson	436	18%
Nonpartisan	Judy Foster	316	9%
Total votes		6,060	100.0%

==== Panola District Seat 1 ====
2016 Chickasaw nation Panola District Seat 1
Party	Candidate	Votes	%
Nonpartisan	Beth Alexander (Incumbent)	582	69%
Nonpartisan	Clint James	183	31%
Total votes		546	100.0%

==== Pontotoc District Seat 5 ====
2016 Chickasaw Nation election Pontotoc District Seat 5
Party	Candidate	Votes	%
Nonpartisan	Lisa Johnson Billy		100%
Total votes			100

==== Tishomingo District Seat 2 ====
2016 Chickasaw Nation election Tishomingo District Seat 2
Party	Candidate	Votes	%
Nonpartisan	Timothy K. Colbert (Incumbent)		100%
Total votes			100

=== Judicial ===
2016 Chickasaw Nation Judicial election Seat 1
Party	Candidate	Votes	%
Nonpartisan	Mark H. Colbert (Incumbent)		100%
Total votes			100

== 2017 ==
=== Legislature ===
==== Pickens District Seat 2 ====
2017 Chickasaw nation Pickens District Seat 2
Party	Candidate	Votes	%
Nonpartisan	Connie Barker (Incumbent)	1,578	73%
Nonpartisan	Michael Thomas Watson	583	27%
Total votes		546	100.0%

==== Pontotoc District Seat 3 ====
2017 Chickasaw nation Pontotoc District Seat 3
Party	Candidate	Votes	%
Nonpartisan	J. Lisa Impson	2,321	75%
Nonpartisan	Kymberly Hazlett	737	25%
Total votes		546	100.0%

==== Pontotoc District Seat 4 ====
2017 Chickasaw Nation election Pontotoc District Seat 4
Party	Candidate	Votes	%
Nonpartisan	Dr. Karen Goodnight (Incumbent)		100%
Total votes			100

==== Tishomingo District Seat 3 ====
2017 Chickasaw Nation election Tishomingo District Seat 3
Party	Candidate	Votes	%
Nonpartisan	Steven Woods (Incumbent)		100%
Total votes			100

=== Judicial ===
2017 Chickasaw Nation Judicial election Seat 3
Party	Candidate	Votes	%
Nonpartisan	Cheri L. Bellefuille-Eldred (Incumbent)		100%
Total votes			100

== 2018 ==
=== Legislature ===
==== Pickens District Seat 1 ====
2018 Chickasaw nation Pickens District Seat 1
Party	Candidate	Votes	%
Nonpartisan	David Worez (Incumbent)	1,476	75%
Nonpartisan	Michael T. Watson	727	25%
Total votes		546	100.0%

==== Pickens District Seat 4 ====
2018 Chickasaw nation Pickens District Seat 4
Party	Candidate	Votes	%
Nonpartisan	Shana Tate Hammond (Incumbent)	1,781	75%
Nonpartisan	Robert "Robby" Rogers	412	25%
Total votes		546	100.0%

==== Pontotoc District Seat 1 ====
2018 Chickasaw Nation election Pontotoc District Seat 1
Party	Candidate	Votes	%
Nonpartisan	Toby Perkins (Incumbent)		100%
Total votes			100

==== Pontotoc District Seat 2 ====
2018 Chickasaw Nation election Pontotoc District Seat 2
Party	Candidate	Votes	%
Nonpartisan	Nancy Elliott (Incumbent)		100%
Total votes			100

==== Tishomingo District Seat 1 ====
2018 Chickasaw Nation election Tishomingo District Seat 1
Party	Candidate	Votes	%
Nonpartisan	Scott Wood (Incumbent)		100%
Total votes			100

=== Judicial ===
2018 Chickasaw Nation Judicial election Seat 2
Party	Candidate	Votes	%
Nonpartisan	Linda English Weeks (Incumbent)		100%
Total votes			100

== 2019 ==
=== Governor ===
2019 Chickasaw Nation Governor election
Party	Candidate	Votes	%
Nonpartisan	Bill Anoatubby/Chris Anoatubby(Incumbent)		100%
Total votes			100

=== Legislature ===
==== Tishomingo District Seat 2 ====
2019 Chickasaw Nation Tishomingo District Seat 2
Party	Candidate	Votes	%
Nonpartisan	Derrick Priddy	649	57.74%
Nonpartisan	Bradley Steven Woods	519	18.82%
Nonpartisan	Scott Clark	251	15.39%
Nonpartisan	Robert Kelly Tucker	201	7.03%
Turnout		2,855	100.00%

===== Runoff =====
2019 Chickasaw Nation Tishomingo District Seat 2 runoff
Party	Candidate	Votes	%
Nonpartisan	Derrick Priddy	818	51%
Nonpartisan	Bradley Steven Woods	785	49%
Total votes		546	100.0%

==== Pickens District Seat 4 ====
2019 Chickasaw nation Pickens District Seat 4
Party	Candidate	Votes	%
Nonpartisan	Linda Briggs (Incumbent)	1,735	75%
Nonpartisan	Michael T. Watson	622	25%
Total votes		546	100.0%

==== Pontotoc District Seat 5 ====
2019 Chickasaw Nation election Pontotoc District Seat 5
Party	Candidate	Votes	%
Nonpartisan	Lisa Johnson Billy (Incumbent)		100%
Total votes			100

==== Panola District Seat 1 ====
2019 Chickasaw Nation election Panola District Seat 1
Party	Candidate	Votes	%
Nonpartisan	Beth Alexander (Incumbent)		100%
Total votes			100

=== Judicial ===
2019 Chickasaw Nation Judicial election Seat 1
Party	Candidate	Votes	%
Nonpartisan	Mark H. Colbert (Incumbent)		100%
Total votes			100

== 2020 ==
=== Legislature ===
==== Pickens District Seat 2 ====
2020 Chickasaw nation Pickens District Seat 2
Party	Candidate	Votes	%
Nonpartisan	Connie Barker (Incumbent)	1,913	75%
Nonpartisan	Michael T. Watson	479	25%
Total votes		546	100.0%

==== Pontotoc District Seat 3 ====
2020 Chickasaw Nation election Pontotoc District Seat 4
Party	Candidate	Votes	%
Nonpartisan	J. Lisa Impson (Incumbent)		100%
Total votes			100

==== Pontotoc District Seat 4 ====
2020 Chickasaw Nation election Pontotoc District Seat 4
Party	Candidate	Votes	%
Nonpartisan	Karen Goodnight (Incumbent)		100%
Total votes			100

==== Tishomingo District Seat 1 ====
2020 Chickasaw Nation election Tishomingo District Seat 1
Party	Candidate	Votes	%
Nonpartisan	Steven Woods (Incumbent)		100%
Total votes			100

=== Judicial ===
2020 Chickasaw Nation Judicial election Seat 3
Party	Candidate	Votes	%
Nonpartisan	Cheri L. Bellefuille-Eldred (Incumbent)		100%
Total votes			100

== 2021 ==
=== Legislature ===
==== Pickens District Seat 1 ====
2021 Chickasaw Nation election Pickens District Seat 1
Party	Candidate	Votes	%
Nonpartisan	Scott Wood (Incumbent)		100%
Total votes			100

==== Pickens District Seat 4 ====
2021 Chickasaw nation Pickens District Seat 4
Party	Candidate	Votes	%
Nonpartisan	Shana Tate Hammond (Incumbent)	1,571	75%
Nonpartisan	Wanda Blackwood Scott	546	25%
Total votes		546	100.0%

==== Pontotoc District Seat 2 ====
2021 Chickasaw nation Pontotoc District Seat 2
Party	Candidate	Votes	%
Nonpartisan	Nancy Elliott (Incumbent)	2,844	75%
Nonpartisan	Oscar Gore	797	25%
Total votes		546	100.0%

==== Pontotoc District Seat 3 ====
2021 Chickasaw Nation Pontotoc District Seat 3
Party	Candidate	Votes	%
Nonpartisan	Toby Perkins (Incumbent)	2,312	73%
Nonpartisan	Bailey Walker	668	18%
Nonpartisan	Monty E. Stick	648	9%
Total votes		6,060	100.0%

=== Judicial ===
2021 Chickasaw Nation Judicial election Seat 2
Party	Candidate	Votes	%
Nonpartisan	Linda English Weeks (Incumbent)		100%
Total votes			100

== 2022 ==
=== Legislature ===
==== Pickens District Seat 3 ====
2022 Chickasaw nation Pickens District Seat 3
Party	Candidate	Votes	%
Nonpartisan	Charles Marris	1,427	66.78%
Nonpartisan	Bradley Steven Woods	710	33.22%
Total votes		546	100.0%

==== Panola District Seat 1 ====
2022 Chickasaw nation Panola District Seat 1
Party	Candidate	Votes	%
Nonpartisan	Beth Alexander (Incumbent)	578	79.29%
Nonpartisan	Baron Burgess	151	20.71%
Total votes		546	100.0%

==== Pontotoc District Seat 5 ====
2022 Chickasaw Nation election Pontotoc District Seat 5
Party	Candidate	Votes	%
Nonpartisan	Lisa Johnson Billy (Incumbent)		100%
Total votes			100

==== Tishomingo District Seat 2 ====
2022 Chickasaw Nation Tishomingo District Seat 2
Party	Candidate	Votes	%
Nonpartisan	Derrick Priddy(Incumbent)	809	61.47%
Nonpartisan	Lisa Hudosn	302	22.95%
Nonpartisan	Robin Woods	205	15.58%
Total votes		6,060	100.0%

=== Judicial ===
2022 Chickasaw Nation Judicial election Seat 1
Party	Candidate	Votes	%
Nonpartisan	Mark H. Colbert (Incumbent)		100%
Total votes			100

== 2023 ==
=== Governor ===
2023 Chickasaw Nation Governor election
Party	Candidate	Votes	%
Nonpartisan	Bill Anoatubby/Chris Anoatubby(Incumbent)		100%
Total votes			100

=== Legislature ===
==== Tishomingo District Seat 3 ====
2023 Chickasaw Nation Tishomingo District Seat 3
Party	Candidate	Votes	%
Nonpartisan	Steven Woods (Incumbent)	729	49.55%
Nonpartisan	Dusk Monethathci	653	44.39%
Nonpartisan	Shane Langford	89	6%
Total votes		6,060	100.0%

===== Runoff =====
2023 Chickasaw nation Tishomingo District Seat 3 runoff
Party	Candidate	Votes	%
Nonpartisan	Dusk Monethathci	821	55.175%
Nonpartisan	Steven Woods (Incumbent)	667	44.825%
Total votes		546	100.0%

==== Pontotoc District Seat 3 ====
2023 Chickasaw Nation election Pontotoc District Seat 3
Party	Candidate	Votes	%
Nonpartisan	J. Lisa Impson (Incumbent)		100%
Total votes			100

==== Pontotoc District Seat 4 ====
2023 Chickasaw Nation election Pontotoc District Seat 4
Party	Candidate	Votes	%
Nonpartisan	Karen Goodnight (Incumbent)		100%
Total votes			100

==== Pickens District Seat 3 ====
2023 Chickasaw Nation election Pickens District Seat 3
Party	Candidate	Votes	%
Nonpartisan	Connie Barker (Incumbent)		100%
Total votes			100

=== Judicial ===
2023 Chickasaw Nation Judicial election Seat 3
Party	Candidate	Votes	%
Nonpartisan	Cheri L. Bellefuille-Eldred (Incumbent)		100%
Total votes			100
