= SaltCreek Casino =

Casino in Pocasset, Oklahoma, US

- Interactive map of SaltCreek Casino
- Location: Pocasset, Oklahoma; 1600 HWY 81, Pocasset, Oklahoma 73079; 35°10′18.952″N 97°57′10.854″W
- Opened: 2012
- Gaming space: 36,645 sq ft (3,404.4 m^{2})
- Notable restaurants: Fork Café, Brook Bar
- Casino type: Land-based
- Owner: Chickasaw Nation of Oklahoma
- Website: SaltCreek Casino

SaltCreek Casino, located in Pocasset, Oklahoma, is the first casino to open in Grady County, Oklahoma. It is the 18th casino owned and operated by the Chickasaw Nation. The casino held a ribbon cutting ceremony on December 18, 2012 and officially opened its doors on December 31, 2012. The 36,000 sq ft (3,300 m^{2}) casino, features 600 different gaming stations, as well as four table games - three Blackjack tables and one for Ultimate Texas Hold’em. At SaltCreek Casino there is one restaurant and one bar. The Brook Bar located in the center of the casino, seats 16,and serves an assortment of beer, wine and liquor. The Fork Café serves home-style food such as chicken fried steak, hamburgers and blue-plate specials. The casino's gift shop, Reflections, also sells Bedré Fine Chocolate, which is also tribally owned.
