= Chisholm Trail Casino =

Casino in Duncan, Oklahoma

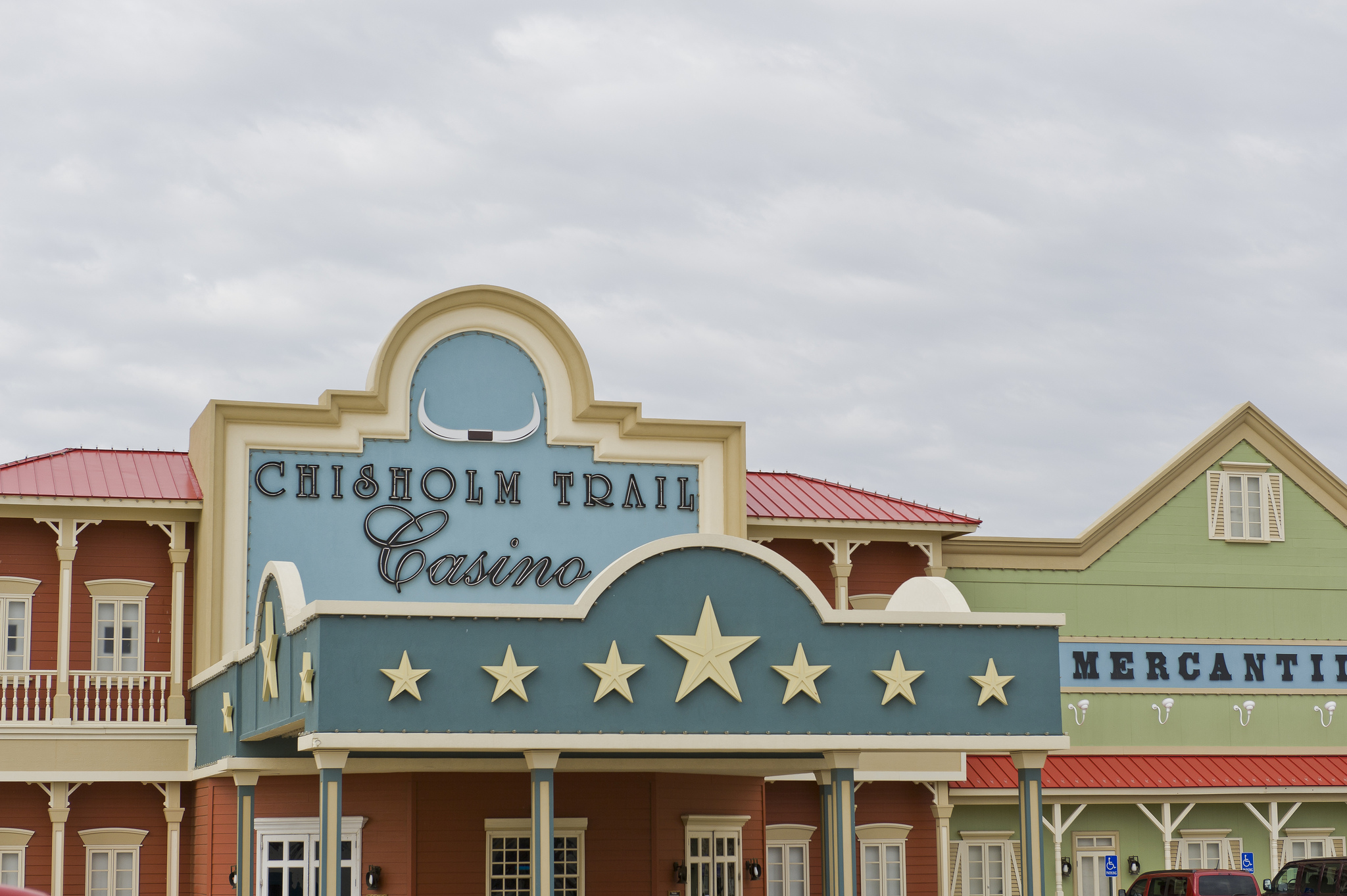
- Interactive map of Chisholm Trail Casino
- Location: Duncan, Oklahoma; 7807 N Highway 81 Duncan, Oklahoma 73533; 34°35′04.4″N 97°58′2″W
- Opened: 2004
- Gaming space: 22,000 sq ft (2,000 m^{2})
- Notable restaurants: Aces Sports Grill
- Casino type: Land-based
- Owner: Chickasaw Nation of Oklahoma
- Website: http://www.chisholmtrailcasino.com/

Chisholm Trail Casino is a casino that opened in Duncan, Oklahoma in October, 2004. The 22,000-square-foot (2,000 m^{2}) casino is owned and operated by the Chickasaw Nation and is open 24 hours daily. Located along the site of the historic Chisholm Trail cattle drive, the casino is five miles north of downtown Duncan on Highway 81, south of Highway 7. The casino is 70 miles south of Norman, Oklahoma and the Nation’s sister gaming facility, Riverwind Casino. Chisholm Trail is 100 miles northwest of WinStar World Casino, another Chickasaw Nation gaming center, located in Thackerville, Oklahoma.

== Games ==
Chisholm Trail Casino offers more than 600 gaming machines.

== Dining ==
The 22,000-square-foot facility also includes a full-service restaurant and bar, Aces Sports Grill. Aces is open 7 days a week and features menu items like burgers, salads, meatloaf, chicken tenders and more. There is also a smoke shop and Rustic Trail Gift Shop at the facility. Chisholm Trail Casino is near by several hotels and motels, including Hampton Inn, Chisholm Suites, Quality Inn and Days Inn.
