= Bromide, Oklahoma =

Town in Oklahoma, US

- Town
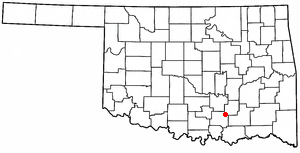
- Location of Bromide, Oklahoma
- Coordinates: 34°25′05″N 96°29′41″W
- Country: United States
- State: Oklahoma
- Counties: Johnston, Coal

Area
  - Total: 0.67 sq mi (1.74 km^{2})
  - Land: 0.67 sq mi (1.74 km^{2})
  - Water: 0 sq mi (0.00 km^{2})
- Elevation: 692 ft (211 m)

Population (2020)
  - Total: 123
  - Density: 182.7/sq mi (70.54/km^{2})
- Time zone: UTC-6 (Central (CST))
  - Summer (DST): UTC-5 (CDT)
- ZIP code: 74530
- Area code: 580
- FIPS code: 40-09150
- GNIS feature ID: 2411731

Bromide is a town in Coal and Johnston counties in the U.S. state of Oklahoma. The population was 123 as of the 2020 Census.

The area around Bromide was noted for its mineral springs, and the bromide content of the water gave the town its name. It was also noted for limestone quarrying and the potential to produce manganese. Proposals to promote economic growth from these assets never materialized.

== History ==
Bromide was founded by Judge William H. Jackson, a former superintendent of the nearby Wapanucka Academy, who recognized the site near several mineral springs as a potential tourist attraction. The community was initially called "Juanita" (1905 - 1906), then "Zenobia" (1906 - 1907), before it was named "Bromide". It incorporated in July 1908. Juanita and Zenobia were the names of two of Jackson's daughters. The name "Bromide" was chosen because of the high content of bromine in the mineral water.

Before Oklahoma statehood, the townsite was part of the Chickasaw Nation. Native Americans were well acquainted with the mineral springs in the area. The Chickasaws called these Oka-Alichi (Medicine Water) or Hopi Kuli (Salt Springs), and believed that the waters had medicinal power, especially for "rheumatism, diseases of the stomach, kidney and bladder ailments, [and] nerve and skin problems".

The first large business in Bromide was a limestone quarry, established by Robert Galbreath Jr., a Tulsa businessman. Stone became economically important about 1911, when the Missouri, Oklahoma and Gulf (MO&G) Railway (later bought by the Kansas, Oklahoma & Gulf (KO&G)) built a spur into Bromide. A rock-crushing plant was built just outside the city. Galbreath built a three-story hotel from rock quarried there. The KO&G promoted Bromide as "the best health resort in the southwestern states". It also ran weekly excursions to the city. Three more hotels, a bathhouse, and a swimming pool were added to support the tourist trade. By 1920, the population had reached 520. The Great Depression dried up the tourist trade. The population of Bromide fell to 352 in 1930, 258 in 1950, and to 180 in 1980. KO&G abandoned its line in 1950.

Manganese (chemical symbol: Mn) ore was discovered in the vicinity of Bromide in 1890. A report published by the U.S. Geological Survey (USGS) stated that the ore deposits were small and could not yield high grade ore (more than 45 percent Mn). However, during World War I, steel producers began accepting ores as low as 35 percent Mn. The USGS report said that about 5,000 tons of ore containing 35 to 40 percent Mn could be produced from the Bromide area deposits. Oilman Robert Galbreath evidently thought this could become sufficiently profitable to be a worthwhile investment. However, the Great Depression put an end to the concept.

The nearby Wapanucka Academy site is listed in the National Register of Historic Places (NR72001065).

== Geography ==
Bromide is located in northeastern Johnston County and southwestern Coal County with the developed townsite mostly on the Johnston side of the county line. The town is 7 miles (11 km) by road northwest of Wapanucka and 21 miles (34 km) northeast of Tishomingo, the Johnston county seat. It is the same distance southwest of Coalgate, the Coal county seat.

According to the United States Census Bureau, Bromide has an area of 0.58 square miles (1.5 km^{2}), all land.

== Demographics ==
Historical population
Census	Pop.	Note	%±
1920	523		—
1930	352		−32.7%
1940	312		−11.4%
1950	258		−17.3%
1960	264		2.3%
1970	231		−12.5%
1980	180		−22.1%
1990	162		−10.0%
2000	163		0.6%
2010	165		1.2%
2020	123		−25.5%
U.S. Decennial Census

=== 2020 census ===
As of the 2020 census, Bromide had a population of 123. The median age was 48.2 years. 17.1% of residents were under the age of 18 and 23.6% of residents were 65 years of age or older. For every 100 females there were 83.6 males, and for every 100 females age 18 and over there were 100.0 males age 18 and over.

All residents lived in rural areas.

There were 54 households in Bromide, of which 46.3% had children under the age of 18 living in them. Of all households, 64.8% were married-couple households, 13.0% were households with a male householder and no spouse or partner present, and 16.7% were households with a female householder and no spouse or partner present. About 11.2% of all households were made up of individuals and 5.6% had someone living alone who was 65 years of age or older.

There were 64 housing units, of which 15.6% were vacant. The homeowner vacancy rate was 1.9% and the rental vacancy rate was 0.0%.

Racial composition as of the 2020 census
Race	Number	Percent
White	70	56.9%
Black or African American	1	0.8%
American Indian and Alaska Native	29	23.6%
Asian	0	0.0%
Native Hawaiian and Other Pacific Islander	0	0.0%
Some other race	5	4.1%
Two or more races	18	14.6%
Hispanic or Latino (of any race)	15	12.2%

=== 2000 census ===
As of the census of 2000, there were 163 people, 63 households, and 43 families residing in the town. The population density was 243.5 inhabitants per square mile (94.0/km^{2}). There were 80 housing units at an average density of 119.5 per square mile (46.1/km^{2}). The racial makeup of the town was 71.17% White, 14.72% Native American, 5.52% from other races, and 8.59% from two or more races. Hispanic or Latino of any race were 4.91% of the population.

There were 63 households, out of which 33.3% had children under the age of 18 living with them, 54.0% were married couples living together, 9.5% had a female householder with no husband present, and 30.2% were non-families. 27.0% of all households were made up of individuals, and 11.1% had someone living alone who was 65 years of age or older. The average household size was 2.59 and the average family size was 3.18.

In the town, the population was spread out, with 31.3% under the age of 18, 6.1% from 18 to 24, 28.2% from 25 to 44, 18.4% from 45 to 64, and 16.0% who were 65 years of age or older. The median age was 36 years. For every 100 females, there were 114.5 males. For every 100 females age 18 and over, there were 96.5 males.

The median income for a household in the town was $21,458, and the median income for a family was $23,333. Males had a median income of $21,563 versus $11,500 for females. The per capita income for the town was $10,427. About 20.5% of families and 25.7% of the population were below the poverty line, including 45.8% of those under the age of eighteen and none of those 65 or over.

== Notable person ==
Overton James was born in Bromide on July 21, 1925. He became governor of the Chickasaw Nation in 1963.
