= Floyd Maytubby =

Governor of the Chickasaw Nation
- In office October 14, 1939 – February 24, 1963
- Preceded by: Douglas H. Johnston
- Succeeded by: Hugh Maytubby

Personal details
- Born: November 27, 1893 Caddo, Indian Territory, U.S.
- Died: February 24, 1963 (aged 69)
- Relatives: Hugh Maytubby (uncle)

Floyd Maytubby was a Chickasaw politician who served as the governor of the Chickasaw Nation from 1939 until his death in 1963.

== Biography ==
Floyd Ernest Maytubby was born on November 27, 1893, in Caddo, Indian Territory, to Samuel Winchester Maytubby and Lulu Mebane. He graduated from Caddo High School in 1911. On June 30, 1917, he married Frances Elizabeth Leecraft. He joined United States Army during World War I.

Maytubby was appointed as the governor of the Chickasaw Nation by the United States federal government on October 14, 1939. He oversaw the liquidation of much of the nation's remaining assets. During his tenure, tribal members campaigned for more direct rule and democratic elections. He died on February 24, 1963. According to Chickasaw.tv, his government's files are lost.
