= Gold Mountain Casino =

Native American casino in Ardmore, Oklahoma

Coordinates: 34°11′05″N 97°06′31″W

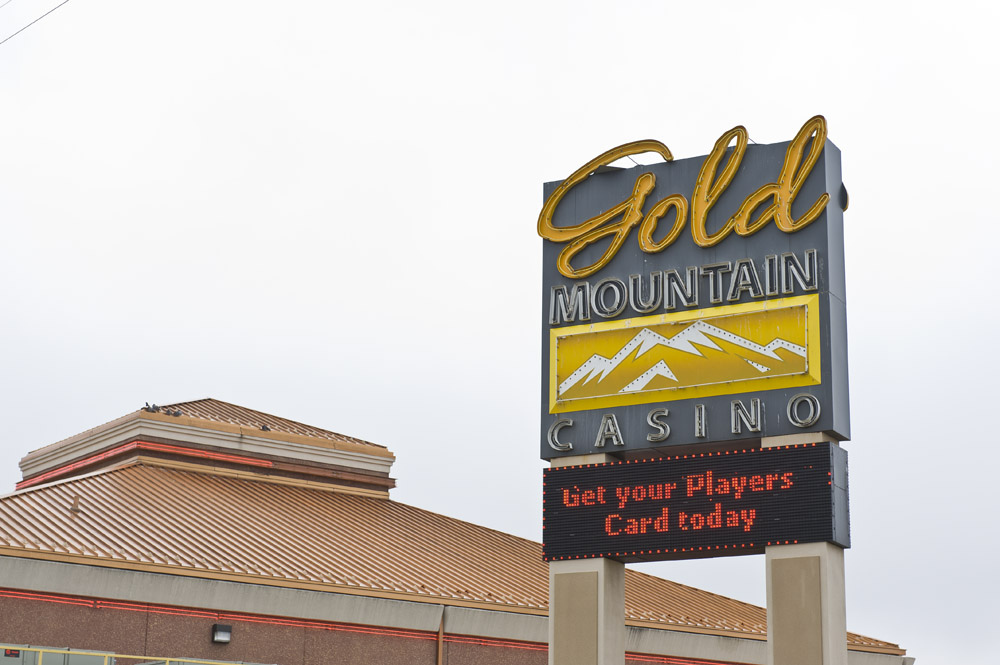
- Interactive map of Gold Mountain Casino
- Location: Ardmore, Oklahoma; 1410 Sam Noble Parkway, Ardmore, Oklahoma 73401
- Opened: 2002
- Gaming space: 8,620 sq ft (801 m^{2})
- Casino type: Land-based
- Owner: Chickasaw Nation of Oklahoma
- Previous names: Ardmore Gaming
- Website: mygoldmountaincasino.com

Gold Mountain Casino is a Native American casino in Ardmore, Oklahoma, owned and operated by the Chickasaw Nation. Originally opened in 2002 as Ardmore Gaming, the facility has grown steadily and today features more than 300 gaming machines. The casino is open 24 hours a day, seven days a week. The 8,620 sq ft (801 m^{2}) casino is located on the corner of P Street N.E. and Sam Noble Parkway, and can be accessed via Interstate 35, exit 33. It is located near the Ardmore Convention Center and the Hardy Murphy Coliseum. Gold Mountain is about 34 miles north of WinStar World Casino in Thackerville, Oklahoma, and 77 miles south of Riverwind Casino in Norman, Oklahoma, which are also Chickasaw-owned gaming facilities.
