= James H. Bounds Barn =

- U.S. National Register of Historic Places
- Location within Oklahoma
- Location: Northwest corner of Williams Rd. & OK 70, Marshall County, Oklahoma, in vicinity of Kingston, Oklahoma
- Coordinates: 34°00′49″N 96°45′45″W
- Area: less than one acre
- NRHP reference No.: 13000941
- Added to NRHP: November 1, 2013

The James H. Bounds Barn, in Marshall County, Oklahoma near Kingston, Oklahoma, was listed on the National Register of Historic Places in 2013.

According to its National Register nomination, the barn "is an exceptionally well-preserved example of a four-crib log barn representing late nineteenth-century and early twentieth-century farming and ranching in the Chickasaw Nation and Oklahoma between 1895 and 1950. The use of square-notching, which is a simpler technique associated with the waning of log construction proficiency, supports a late nineteenth-century construction date. After 1950 agriculture in Oklahoma had become largely mechanized and began to intensify and specialize enough that general-purpose barns, especially log barns, became increasingly obsolete. Unlike frame-constructed barns, log barns could not be easily electrified or plumbed, and they were essentially useless for storing machinery. The James H. Bounds Barn was never modernized, but it did remain in use for hay storage until the late 1980s."
