= Hugh Maytubby =

Chickasaw politician

Governor of the Chickasaw Nation
- In office May 1963 – October 1963
- Preceded by: Floyd Maytubby
- Succeeded by: Overton James

Personal details
- Born: June 27, 1892
- Died: May 1970 (aged 77)
- Relatives: Floyd Maytubby (nephew)

Hugh Maytubby was a Chickasaw politician who served as the governor of the Chickasaw Nation from May 1963 to October 1963.

== Biography ==
E. B. "Hugh" Maytubby was born on June 27, 1892. He became the governor of the Chickasaw Nation in May 1963 after the death of his nephew Floyd Maytubby. He left office at the end of his nephew's term in October 1963, and he died in May 1970.
