= Danica Nava =

Chickasaw author and tech executive

Danica Nava is an author and executive assistant in the technology industry.

An enrolled citizen of the Chickasaw Nation, Nava published her first book, The Truth According to Ember, on August 6, 2024. She was inspired by her love of romantic comedies and frustration with the lack of Native American representation. The love interest is an information technology professional based on her experience working in the industry. The Truth According to Ember received positive reviews. Kirkus Reviews referred to it as a "captivating romance that effortlessly balances laugh-out-loud scenes and heartwarming family moments."

== Personal life ==
Nava has an MBA from the USC Marshall School of Business.

She is married and has one child.

== Publications ==
- The Truth According to Ember, Berkley Books, 2024
- Love is a War Song, Berkley Books, 2025
- Sunflower Season, Berkley Books, 2026
