= Newcastle Casino =

Chickasaw casino in Oklahoma

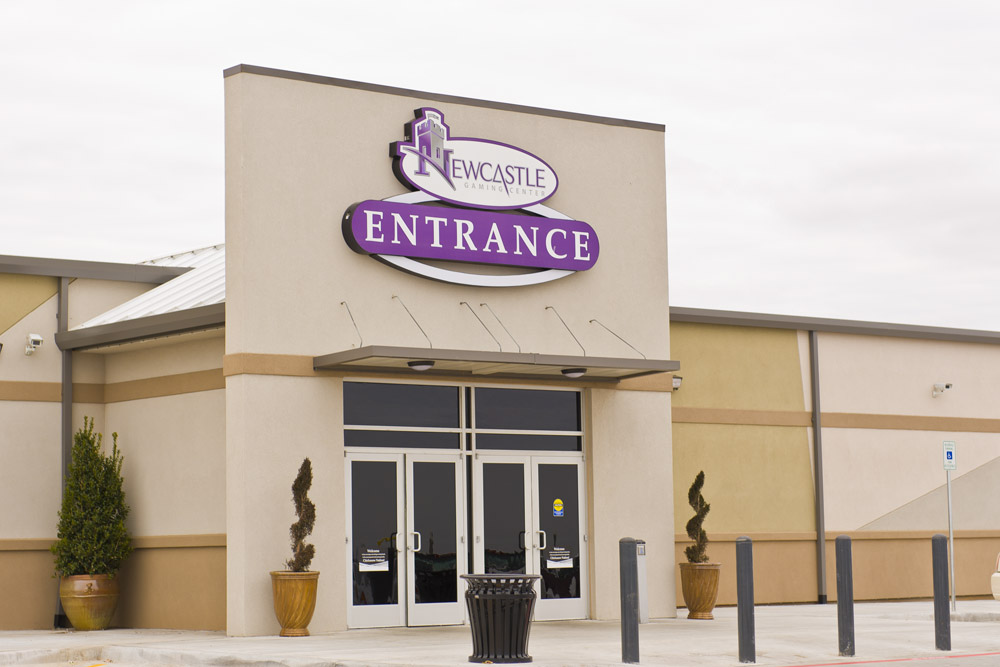
- Interactive map of Newcastle Casino
- Location: Newcastle, OK; 2457 Highway 62 Service Road Newcastle, Oklahoma 73065; 35°14′25″N 97°35′29″W
- Opened: 1998
- Gaming space: 112,000 sq ft (10,400 m^{2})
- Notable restaurants: Kitchen 44; Front Row Sports Bar
- Casino type: Land-based
- Owner: Chickasaw Nation of Oklahoma
- Website: https://newcastlecasino.com/

Newcastle Casino opened in Newcastle, Oklahoma in 1998. The 112,000-square-foot (10,400 m^{2}) casino is owned and operated by the Chickasaw Nation and is open 24 hours daily. The casino is located on North Main Street between U.S. Route 62 and Interstate 44 in Oklahoma and is ten miles (16 km) northwest of its sister property of Riverwind Casino in Norman, Oklahoma. Newcastle Casino features a restaurant and a sports bar.

== Games ==
Newcastle Casino offers 14 table games including Blackjack, 3-Card Poker, Ultimate Texas Hold'Em, Roulette, Baccarat and has 3,000 electronic games.

== Dining ==
The casino offers a restaurant and a full-service bar. Kitchen 44 offers a variety of Southern-style dishes for breakfast, lunch and dinner. The 82-seat restaurant is open 24 hours a day, seven days a week. Kitchen 44 also offers a Grab & Go menu with quick items for guests in a hurry. Front Row Sports Bar is a full-service bar with a select menu featuring chili pie, hot dogs, nacho, chips and candy. Guests can also enjoy their favorite sports game on one of nine flat-screen televisions.
