= WinStar World Casino =

Casino and hotel complex in Oklahoma

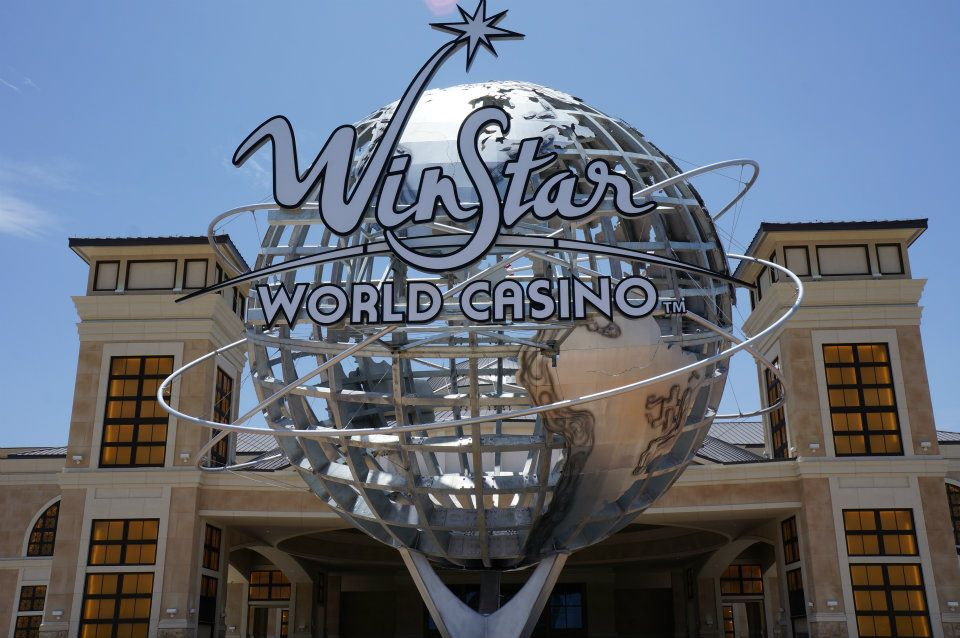
- Interactive map of WinStar World Casino and Resort
- Location: 777 Casino Avenue, Thackerville, Oklahoma 73459; 33°45′29″N 97°7′55″W
- Opened: 2003
- Theme: Native American
- No. of rooms: 1395 on main casino complex (395 in Resort Tower, 500 in Pool Tower North, 500 in Pool Tower South); 100 rooms in The Inn at Winstar (offsite property); Total: 1495
- Gaming space: 370,000 sq ft (34,000 m^{2})
- Notable restaurants: Panda Express, Toby Keith's I Love This Bar & Grill, Vinos' Italian Eatery, Palladium Sports Lounge, Gran Via Buffet, Kirby's Steakhouse & Mickey Mantle's, Red River Grill, NYC Burgers & Dogs, Dallas Cowboys Bar & Grill, IHOP Express, Matador's Pizzeria, Khan's Fire Mongolian Grill, Chips 'N Ales, Terrace View Cafe, Capisce Ristorante Italiano, Le Paris Bakery and Cafe, Taco Casa
- Casino type: Land-based
- Owner: The Chickasaw Nation
- Previous names: WinStar World Casino and Resort
- Renovated in: 2009–current
- Website: www.winstar.com

WinStar World Casino and Resort is an American tribal casino and hotel located in Thackerville, Oklahoma, near the Oklahoma–Texas state line. It is owned and operated by the Chickasaw Nation. The casino opened as the WinStar Casinos in 2004, and was expanded (with a 395-room hotel tower) and renamed WinStar World Casino in 2009; its 370,000 square feet (34,000 m^{2}) of casino floor made it the world's largest casino. In August 2013, WinStar Resorts completed a major expansion project, which added a new 1000-room second hotel tower that was divided into two phases; this also added a new casino that is attached to the tower. As a result of the completion of this expansion, the casino overtook Foxwoods Resort Casino to become the largest casino in the United States and one of the largest in the world based on gaming floor space. WinStar has over 10,000 electronic games, a 55-table poker room, 100 total table games including craps and roulette, Racer's off-track betting, and multiple high limit rooms.

== Location and history ==
WinStar World Casino and Resort is located about 120 miles south from the Oklahoma City metropolitan area and one hour north of the Dallas-Fort Worth metroplex and attracts many people from the North Texas region as well as Oklahoma residents. The casino's 6,500 seat Global Event Center has been home to some popular entertainment attractions including Jay Leno, Vince Gill, Adam Lambert, Weezer, Lil Wayne, ZZ Top, Maroon 5, Kid Rock, Tony Bennett, and Davy Jones, who gave his final concert at WinStar on February 19, 2012.

WinStar World Casino and Resort is the biggest casino in the United States, in terms of the total number of table games and gaming machines, according to many gambling blogs and casino directories.

The casino closed temporarily between March 16 to March 31, 2020, due to the 2019–20 coronavirus pandemic as announced by Chickasaw Nation Governor Bill Anoatubby. The casino was closed throughout the remainder of April 2020. The casino reopened in May 2020, with restrictive guidelines.

== Design ==
WinStar was conceived by noted designer Larry E. Seitz whose work includes Sands Casinos, Trump Taj Mahal, Grand Casinos in Mississippi, Barona Casino, Buffalo Run, Chisholm Trail, Grand Princess, SS Norway, Casino Panama, Costa Rica Casino, Stellaris Casino Aruba, and the Paradise Island Casino among others. Additionally Hotels created for the brands Hilton, Hyatt, Sheraton, Marriott, Crowne Plaza, Melina, Loews Hotels, Holiday, Ramada, InterContinental, and independents worldwide. Restaurants and Clubs have been produced internationally. Special effects, commissioned art, and sculptures were constructed and implemented by Dallas-based ValueWorks and produced by their suppliers in the U.S. and around the world. The exterior of the building was detailed by Lyndon Stromberg, who also worked on The Venetian and the MGM Grand in Las Vegas as well as the Atlantis Paradise Island Resort in the Bahamas and Planet Hollywood in New York City. The long façade exterior of WinStar World Casino features replicas of London's Parliament Building, Rome's Coliseum and the Arc de Triomphe from Paris.

The interior of the casino is themed with major cities of the world, with gaming plazas featuring motifs from Beijing, Cairo, London, Madrid, New York, Paris, Rio, Rome, and Vienna. Each gaming plaza features slot machines and restaurants appropriate to the theme, while high limit gaming areas and table games are featured in some plazas.

== Hotel information ==
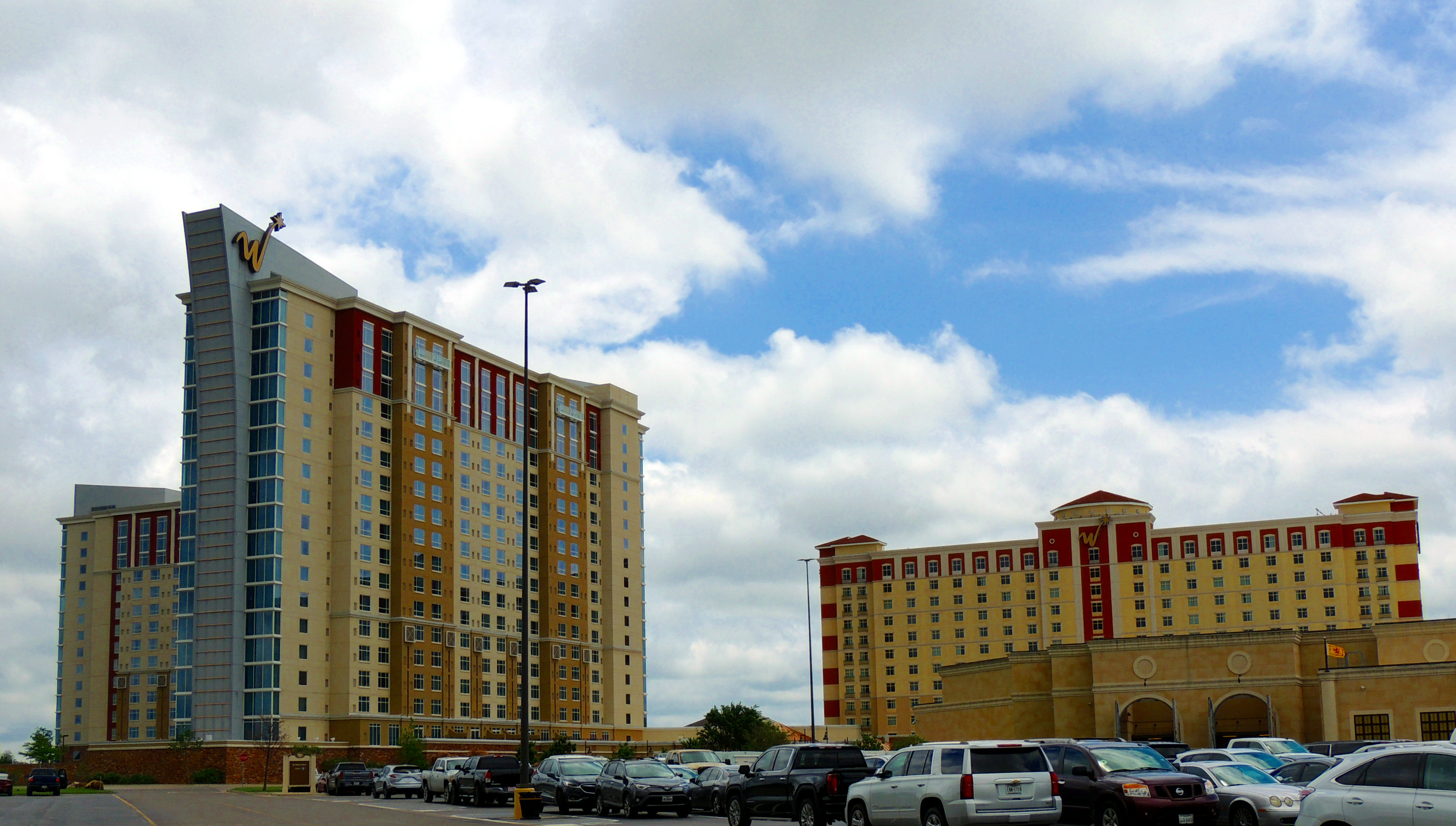
The hotel towers at the resort

WinStar World Casino Hotel includes three hotel towers and 1,399 rooms. On August 6, 2009, the original 395-room hotel tower held a grand opening celebration that featured performances by American Idol winner Kelly Clarkson and American rock band Lynyrd Skynyrd. Meeting rooms that have varied capacities of 10-200 people, a resort-style pool with a custom-built waterfall grotto, the Spa at WinStar, ONYX Boutique and the Isle at WinStar gift shop. WinStar World Casino and Resort offers a variety of restaurants, many of which are open until late night hours, including Dallas Cowboys Bar & Grill. The second hotel tower, the Pool Tower North, opened in August 2013, while the third hotel tower, the Pool Tower South, opened in early 2014. Both towers have a capacity of 500 rooms each and are adjacent to each other. The Inn at WinStar has 101 rooms, and is accessed from the casino and the RV park by a 24-hour shuttle service.

The playing of casino games and slots is restricted to those 18 years old and above.

== Offsite areas ==
=== WinStar Golf Club ===
The WinStar Golf Club features two 18-hole championship golf courses designed by former PGA Tour Pro, D.A. Weibring. In addition, the WinStar Golf Academy, a 4,850-square-foot (451 m^{2}) facility, offers private golf lessons.

=== WinStar RV Park ===
The FunTown RV park at WinStar is a 200-space RV Park that is available to people visiting the casino. A shuttle service to the casino is available to guests in the RV Park.

== See also ==
- List of integrated resorts
