= Jeff Carpenter =

American songwriter

- Genres: Native American, alternative rock
- Occupations: Musician, songwriter
- Instruments: Guitar, drums, saxophone
- Member of: Injunuity
- Website: www.injunuity.net

Jeff Carpenter is a musician and songwriter with the all Native American orchestral rock band Injunuity.

== Career ==
Carpenter, who is of Chickasaw ancestry, began playing music while in grade school in his home town of Ada, Oklahoma, with acoustic guitar as his primary instrument, adding bass guitar, drums, electric guitar, and the saxophone to his repertoire as his interests expanded. In 2007, he was invited by Mississippi Choctaw composer and flutist Brad Clonch to join him in playing Native American music for the Chickasaw Nation Hall of Fame induction ceremony. He and Clonch began playing shows around Oklahoma, adding other members to round out a band, which they dubbed "Injunuity". The group soon branched out to playing venues across the country, in Alabama, New Mexico, and Wisconsin. In July 2013, they headlined the 5th annual Apache Moon Festival in Semione, Switzerland at the invitation of the concert's director.

Injunuity's sound is based on a melding of Carpenter's and Clonch's backgrounds, combining traditional and modern themes, and string orchestra and piano with modern drums and electric guitar to cover several genres of music, from folk to Rock to Classical. Carpenter and Clonch primarily compose their own songs, utilizing digital recording to produce some of their more complex compositions. Clonch plays the Native American flute and keyboard and Carpenter lead guitar and alto sax, with James Monroe on trumpet, Robbie Blair on bass guitar, and Ashton Booth on drums. The group's most recent addition is vocals by Ada, Oklahoma native and Nashville, Tennessee recording artist Brittany Dawn.

Since Native Americans in previous centuries didn’t have recording technology and many of their songs were lost, a primary goal of Injunuity is to help keep the musical aspect of Native American culture alive through the music of tribal instruments, as well as educating non-Natives about Native Americans and music within their culture.

== Discography ==
- Unconquered (2007)
- Fight for Survival (2010)
- Nativity — Christmas with Injunuity (2011)
- Spirits (2012)

The full-length EP Fight for Survival has been selected by Phoenix-based Canyon Records for re-release nationally and internationally.

== Awards ==
Carpenter has won several Native American Music Awards, called "Nammys," equivalent to mainstream music's Grammys. In 2008, he and Clonch won a Nammy for Best Debut Group of the Year at the 10th annual Native American Music Awards, presented for the band's first EP release Unconquered. In 2010 the band's third CD Fight for Survival won Carpenter and Clonch a Nammy for Songwriters of the Year. They have also been nominated in the Nammy Best Instrumental Recording category and recently considered for Best Alternative Native Rock Album in the Indian Summer Music Awards.
