= Black Gold Casino =

Chickasaw Nation casino located in south central Oklahoma

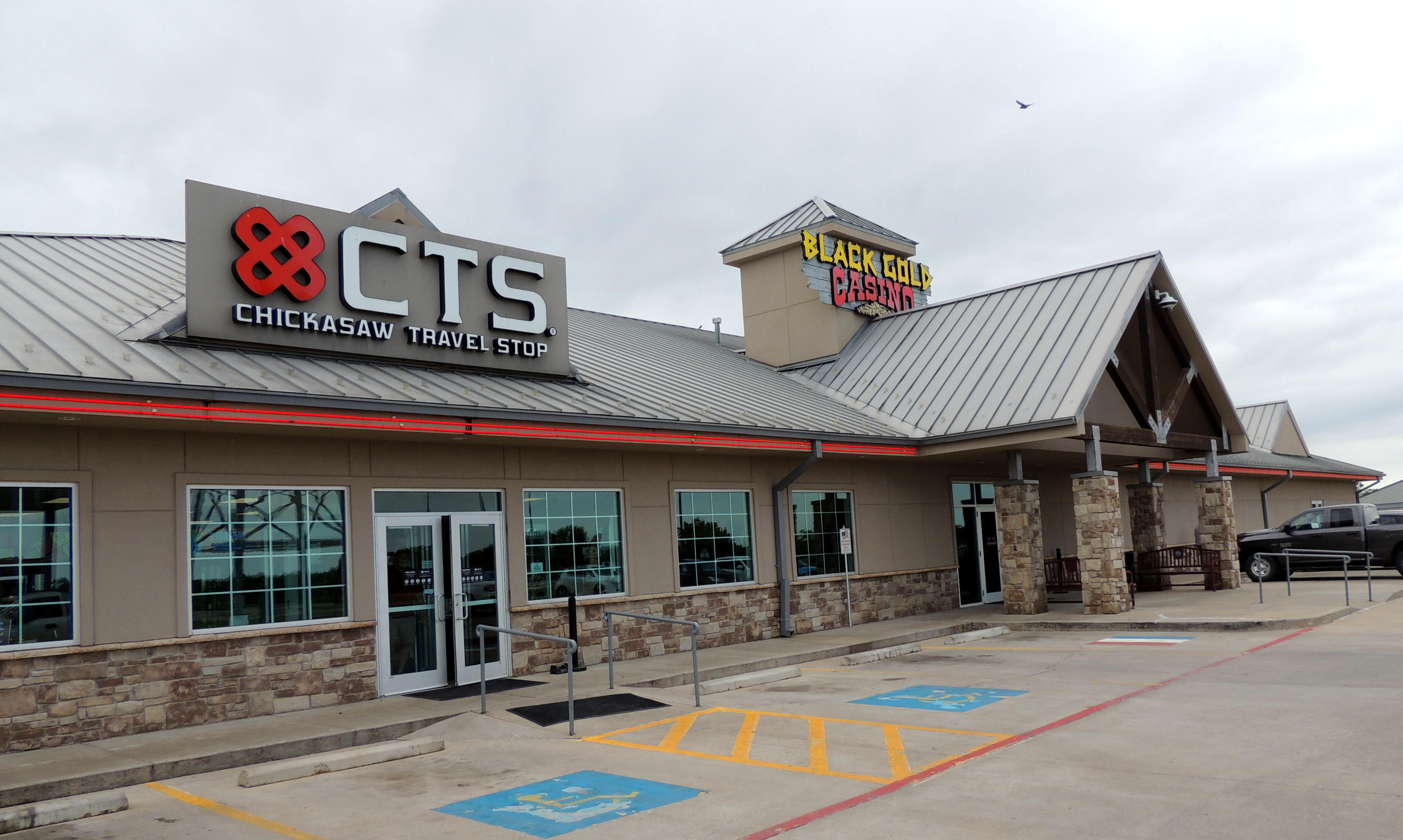
- Black Gold Casino in Oklahoma

- Location in south central Oklahoma Black Gold Casino (the United States)
- Interactive map of Black Gold Casino
- Location: Wilson, Carter County, Oklahoma; United States; 288 Mulberry Lane; 34.17207°N 97.413812°W
- Gaming space: 3,744 square feet (347.8 m^{2})
- Casino type: Land
- Owner: Chickasaw Nation
- Previous names: Wilson Travel Plaza
- Website: Black Gold Casino

Black Gold Casino is a Native American gaming syndicate operated and owned by the Chickasaw Nation in the state of Oklahoma. The casino is adjacent to U.S. Route 70 in Oklahoma bearing due north of Wilson, Oklahoma within Oklahoma administrative division of Carter County. The casino establishment offers provisions by the adjoining Chickasaw Travel Stop (CTS) providing travel necessities and a cultural native Chickasaw smokeshop.

== Architectural Signage ==
The Black Gold Casino is perceptive from the roadway by the stature of an oil derrick constructed with structural steel forming a four stilt steel derrick. The casino architectural signage is illustrative of the early 20th century wooden drilling rig derrick once populating the south central Oklahoma landscape. The black gold commodity was discovered in luxuriant abundance at the Healdton and Hewitt oilfields in Carter County, Oklahoma during the 1910s.

The Healdton Oil Field Bunk House was built in 1923 as housing for boomchasers or wildcatter workers employed at the oil field lease sites. The south Oklahoma oil field bunk house is recognized on the National Register of Historic Places and is in a close vicinity of Wilson, Oklahoma.

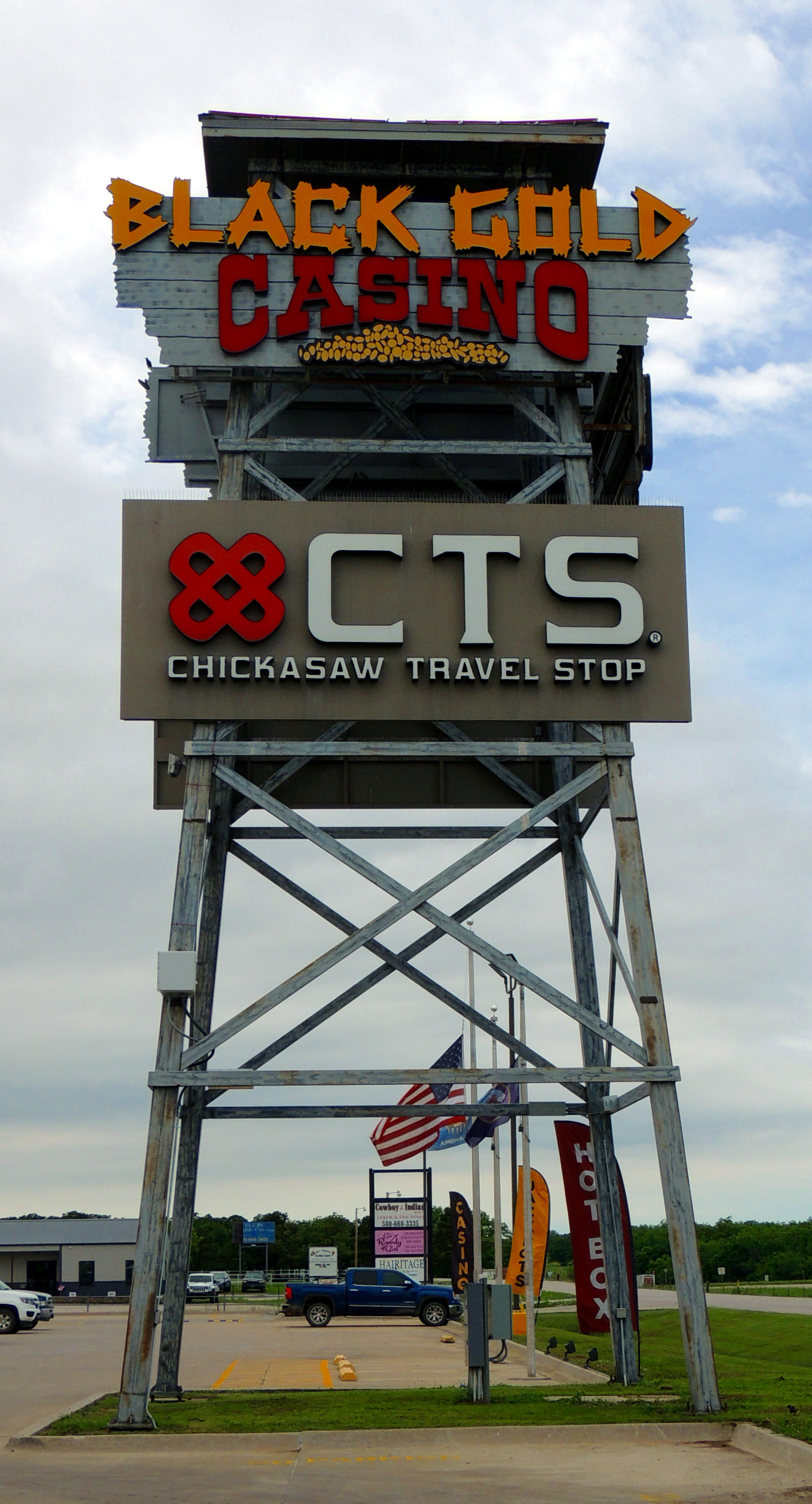
Black Gold Casino oil derrick replica

== See also ==
- American Gaming Association
- History of gambling in the United States
- Indian Gaming Regulatory Act
- National Indian Gaming Commission
