= Rebecca Sandefur =

Native American sociologist

- Citizenship: Chickasaw Nation and American
- Title: Professor
- Awards: MacArthur Fellowship

Academic background
- Education: University of Wisconsin–Madison
- Alma mater: University of Chicago
- Thesis: The Social Organization of Legal Careers (2001)

Academic work
- Discipline: Sociology
- Institutions: Stanford University; University of Illinois at Urbana–Champaign; American Bar Foundation; Arizona State University
- Main interests: Justice, social capital, legal careers

Rebecca Leigh Sandefur is an American sociologist. She is Professor in the School of Social and Family Dynamics at Arizona State University and a faculty fellow of the American Bar Foundation (ABF). At the ABF, she founded the access to justice research initiative in 2010. Sandefur also won a MacArthur "Genius" Fellowship in 2018 for "promoting a new, evidence-based approach to increasing access to civil justice for low-income communities".

== Contributions ==
Sandefur's research focuses on how low-income Americans consume legal services. The Chicago Tribune described her research on alternative approaches to settling civil justice disputes over housing, employment, and family issues as the kind of scholarship that can sometimes "pass largely unnoticed by the broader culture". Sandefur is a faculty fellow of the American Bar Foundation, where she leads a research program on access to justice and contributes to research following the career trajectories of people after they earn their Juris Doctor degrees.

Sandefur is also known for her theoretical work on social capital, including her most-cited publication, the 2000 book chapter "A Paradigm for Social Capital" co-written with Edward Laumann, in which she argues that social capital should be understood in terms of benefits that realize people's goals, rather than only as resources to which people have access.

== Education and career ==
Sandefur earned her B.A. from the University of Wisconsin. In 2001 she earned her Ph.D. from the University of Chicago with a dissertation on "the social organization of legal careers". She worked for 9 years as faculty in the Stanford University sociology department, then became an associate professor of Sociology and the Law at the University of Illinois at Urbana–Champaign, and a fellow at the American Bar Foundation. She joined the faculty of Arizona State University in 2019.

== Personal life ==
Sandefur is an enrolled member of the Chickasaw Nation.

== Works ==
- Sandefur, Rebecca L., ed. (2009). Access to Justice. Sociology of Crime, Law, and Deviance. Vol. 12. Emerald Group. ISBN 9781848552432.
