= Buffalo Run =

Coordinates: 39°08′01″N 81°16′40″W

Buffalo Run is a stream located entirely within Ritchie County, West Virginia.

Buffalo Run was so named by Native Americans after the buffalo, which was hunted in the area until the 1790s.

== See also ==
- List of rivers of West Virginia
