= Abraham Bishop =

American farmer and economic populist

- Born: 1763; New Haven, Connecticut
- Died: 1844 (aged 80–81)
- Occupations: Gentleman farmer, civic leader
- Spouses: Nancy Dexter (m. 1792; div. 1800); Betsey Law
- Parent(s): Samuel and Mehetabel Basset Bishop

Abraham Bishop (1763–1844) was an American farmer and economic populist. He was a vocal supporter of Thomas Jefferson and was known for his family's Federalist affiliation.

== Biography ==
=== Education and career ===
Bishop's parents were Samuel and Mehetabel Basset Bishop; his father was a public official who had served as a mayor and judge in New Haven, Connecticut. He graduated from Yale University at 15 years old. At 22 Abraham joined the bar in 1785. Two years later he toured through Europe taking a trip. In 1789 Abraham came back to New Haven. He had been educationally fulfilled by great libraries and English debates. Abraham often criticized the new Constitution and the political power of the Christian religion. In 1790, Abraham became director of the American Academy and was the head of Hopkins School.

During the early 1790s Bishop worked to improve and establish importance of education via efforts such as consolidating schools and introducing graded classrooms, as well as female education. In 1791 Abraham migrated to Boston, but would later return to New Haven by 1794. In Boston he continued to work as an educator and public speaker. Bishop also wrote for The Boston Argus under the pseudonym “John Paul Martin”. His articles focused on topics such as educational reform, his opposition to theatre, and race. Bishop used his father's influence to enter into politics and he became the clerk of the following areas: country court (1795–1800), probate court (1796–1800), and superior court (1798–1801). By 1800 Bishop was experiencing a lack of success, something his critics claimed was due to his ego and a sign of questionable character.

By mid to late 1800 Bishop began working with Connecticut Republicans, particularly vice-presidential candidate Aaron Burr, on campaign strategies. Bishop planned an address to the Phi Beta Kappa Society entitled "Connecticut Republicanism: An Oration on the extent and Power of Political Delusion", intending to promote controversy and attack the Federalist political and religious establishment in Connecticut. The society would later rescind this invitation after discovering Bishop's intentions, but he was then invited to read the speech at the White Haven church. The address would also be published in several newspapers. Thomas Jefferson was supportive of Bishop's speech, stating that it was "making wonderful progress, and is said to be the best Anti-republican eye-water which has ever yet appeared.” This speech was believed by Federalists to be the reason why Bishop's father Samuel received the appointment of New Haven collector through Jefferson in 1801. Bishop would assume this role after his father in 1803, a position he held until his removal in 1829 by President Andrew Jackson. Throughout all of this, Bishop continued to put out written work while also working with the Republican party.

=== Family ===
Abraham married Nancy Dexter of Newburyport, Massachusetts in 1792. They gave birth to Mary Ann Bishop, but later divorced in 1800. He remarried to Betsey Law of Cheshire, Connecticut. Abraham's only brother, John Bishop, died at the age of 36 in New Haven according to the Newburyport Herald newspaper.

=== Death and legacy ===
Bishop died in 1844, in Newburyport, Massachusetts. In 1956 the Yale chapter of Phi Beta Kappa re-added Bishop to its rolls. According to the Yale Alumni Magazine, Bishop's name had been removed by a record keeper for political reasons. This removal would result in the belief that Bishop had been expelled. The magazine also reported that the New York Herald Tribune recorded the event, stating that “the Yale Chapter of Phi Beta Kappa ... acted today to restore the name of Abraham Bishop, a supporter of Thomas Jefferson, which was removed from its rolls in 1800 for political reasons”.

== Political views ==
The Bishop family was Federalist, and so was the state of Connecticut, making it impossible for Thomas Jefferson to capture that state's majority vote during his presidential election. After Jefferson won the presidential election of 1800, he appointed Abraham Bishop's father, Samuel, as the lucrative post of Collector of the Port of New Haven, as a way of thanking Abraham for his efforts

== Bibliography ==
- The Rights of Black Men (1791)
- Bishop, Abraham (1797). Georgia speculation unveiled: in two numbers. Hartford: Elisha Babcock.
- An oration on the extent and power of political delusion. Delivered in New-Haven, on the evening preceding the public commencement. September 1800.
- Oration delivered in Wallingford, on the 11th of March 1801, before the Republicans of the state of Connecticut, at their general thanksgiving, for the election of Thomas Jefferson to the president and of Aaron Burr to the vice presidency of the United States of America. 1801.
- Bishop, Abraham (1802). Proofs of a conspiracy, against Christianity, and the government of the United States; exhibited in several views of the union of church and state in New-England. Hartford: John Babcock.
