= Overton James =

- Itoahtubbi

Governor of the Chickasaw Nation
- In office 1963–1987
- Preceded by: Hugh Maytubby
- Succeeded by: Bill Anoatubby

Personal details
- Born: July 21, 1925 Bromide, Oklahoma, U.S.
- Died: September 16, 2015 (aged 90) Ada, Oklahoma, U.S.
- Education: Southeastern Oklahoma State University (BA)

Overton James (July 21, 1925 – September 16, 2015) was an educator and Governor of the Chickasaw Nation. After graduating from college, he taught school in Oklahoma. He was first appointed Governor in 1963 and served until 1971. He was then elected to that position and served until his last term ended in 1987. In 1985, he was alleged to have accepted illegal kickbacks for construction contracts within the Chickasaw Nation. He was indicted, pleaded guilty, and sentenced to a short prison term.

== Early life ==
Overton James was Governor of the Chickasaw Nation from 1963 to 1987. Born July 21, 1925 in Bromide, Oklahoma to Chickasaw parents, Rufus (Cub) James and Vinnie May Seely, he was raised in Wapanucka, Oklahoma. His Chickasaw name is Itoahtubbi.

After graduation from high school in Wapanucka, James spent two and a half years in the U.S. Navy. Then he returned to Oklahoma and enrolled in Southeastern State College (now Southeastern State University) in Durant, Oklahoma, where he earned a B. A. in Education in 1949. He spent the next ten years teaching school and coaching athletics in Ravia, Caddo, and Shattuck, Oklahoma. Meanwhile, he earned a Master's degree at Southeastern State College in 1955.

== Chickasaw Nation governor ==
In 1963, President John F. Kennedy appointed James as Governor of the Chickasaw Nation. He was then the youngest person ever to serve in that office. Ultimately he served four consecutive two year terms as a Presidential appointee, then was elected to four consecutive four-year terms by the citizens of Chickasaw Nation. He also has served as president (for four terms) of the Inter-Tribal Council of the Five Civilized Tribes, president of the Choctaw-Chickasaw Confederation, past chairman of the State Indian Affairs Commission, trustee of the National Indian Athletic Hall of Fame, member of the Indian Education Subcommittee of the National Council on Indian Opportunity, and member of the National Congress of American Indians. He was succeeded as Governor by Bill Anoatubby.

Concerned about the poor state of health care facilities for the Chickasaws, James began to campaign for improvements and funding from the Federal Government. He lobbied officials of the Indian Health Service (IHS) and the Speaker of the U. S. House of Representatives, Carl Albert. By 1968, IHS opened a clinic in Tishomingo, Oklahoma, the first health care facility in the Chickasaw Nation. However, the clinic was only staffed two days a week. The staff served two days a week at a facility in Coalgate and one day in Ardmore. Inhabitants of the area who needed to be hospitalized had to travel to the nearest Indian Hospital in Talihina or Lawton, Oklahoma.

He was also important in the decision of the Chickasaw Nation to purchase the former Artesian Hotel, renaming it the Chickasaw Motor Inn and turning it into the first business owned and operated by the tribe. The business earned about $100,000 during its first year of operation. During his governorship, the number of Chickasaw employees rose from about 30 to about 200. Tribal revenues increased from about $750,000 to $11 million during his tenure.

Overton James was inducted into the Chickasaw Hall of Fame in 1987.

James was said to have opened every meeting he attended or every speech he made as governor by saying, “I bring you greetings from the great unconquered and unconquerable Chickasaw Nation”.

== Criminal indictment ==
In 1989, the Philadelphia Inquirer published a story indicating that Overton James received $94,000 in kickbacks for helping Kraig Kendall, a Shawnee, Oklahoma builder, acquire about $14 million in contracts to perform construction work for the Chickasaw Nation. James had been indicted by a federal grand jury on charges of fraud and extortion in 1985. Overton James admitted that his company received the money and was sentenced to 9 months in a federal prison in January 1989.

== Death ==
James died, aged 90, on September 16, 2015.

Political offices
Preceded by Hugh Maytubby	Governor of the Chickasaw Nation; 1963–1987	Succeeded by Bill Anoatubby
