= Chris Anoatubby =

Governor of the Chickasaw Nation

Governor of the Chickasaw Nation
- Incumbent
- Assumed office June 26, 2026
- Lieutenant: Scott Wood
- Preceded by: Bill Anoatubby

Lieutenant Governor of the Chickasaw Nation
- In office September 30, 2019 – June 26, 2026
- Governor: Bill Anoatubby
- Preceded by: Jefferson Keel
- Succeeded by: Scott Wood

Personal details
- Born: September 15, 1972 (age 54)
- Citizenship: American; Chickasaw Nation
- Party: Democratic
- Relatives: Bill Anoatubby (father)
- Education: University of Oklahoma, Oklahoma City (BS); Southeastern Oklahoma State University (MBA)

Chris Anoatubby (born September 15, 1972) is a Chickasaw politician who has been Governor of the Chickasaw Nation since June 26, 2026, succeeding his father, Bill Anoatubby. He served as the Lieutenant Governor of the Chickasaw Nation from 2019 to 2026.

== Biography ==
Chris Anoatubby is the son of Bill Anoatubby. He graduated from the University of Oklahoma Health Sciences Center and Southeastern Oklahoma State University. He began his career with the Chickasaw Nation in 1997 as a pharmacist and in 2010 he was made the nation's chief medical solutions officer. In 2018, he was appointed deputy secretary for the Chickasaw Nation Department of Health. He was elected Lieutenant Governor of the Chickasaw Nation in 2019 and is set to succeed Bill Anoatubby as governor upon his retirement.

Political offices
Preceded by Bill Anoatubby	Governor of the Chickasaw Nation; 2026–present	Incumbent
