= Bedre Fine Chocolate =

Chocolatier in Oklahoma, United States

Bedré Fine Chocolate

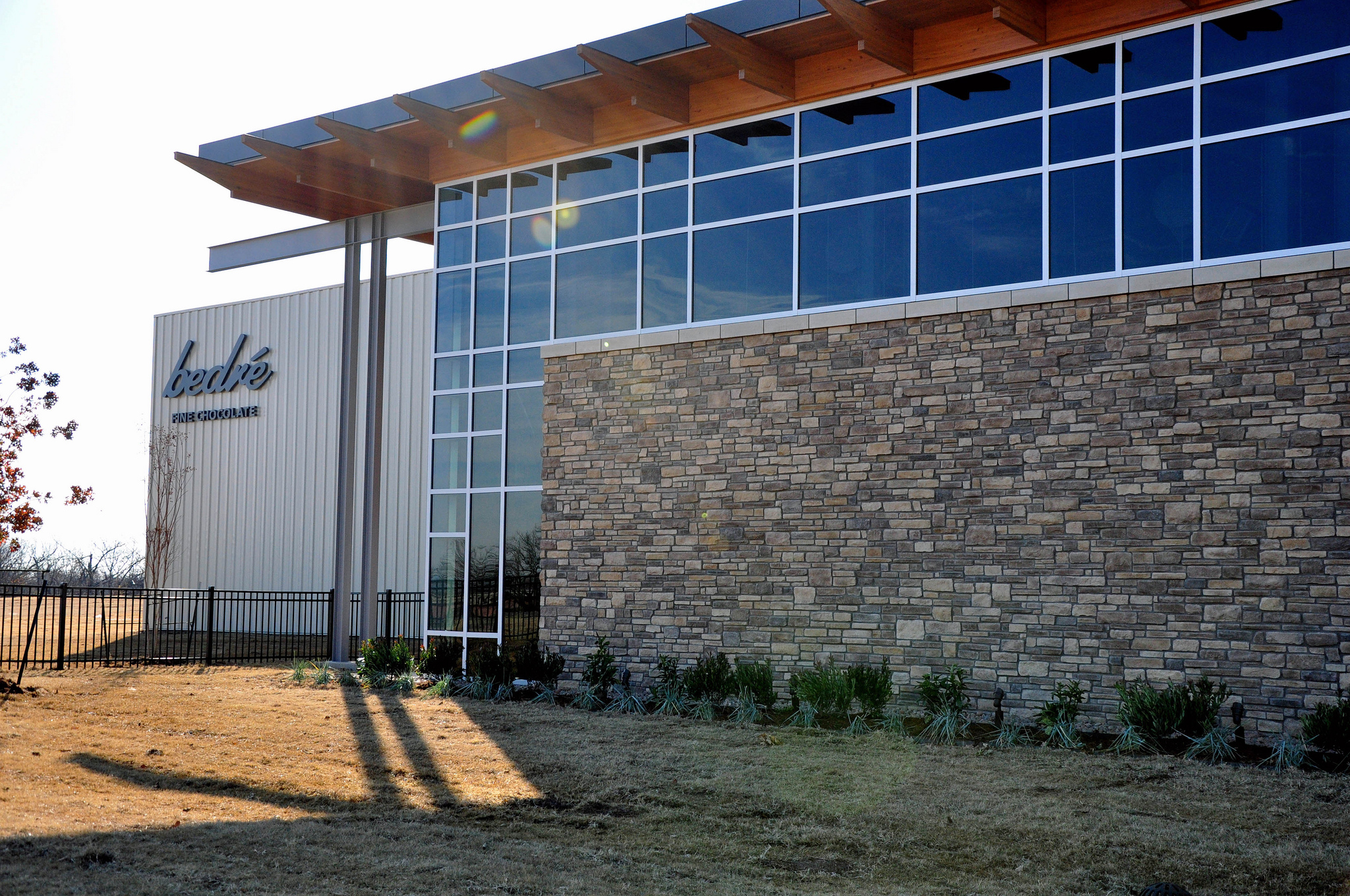
- A view of the outside of Bedrè Fine Chocolate factory in Davis, OK.
- Company type: Privately held company
- Industry: Confectionery production
- Founded: Ada, Oklahoma, (1980s)
- Founder: Pete Cantrell
- Headquarters: Davis, Oklahoma, United States
- Products: Chocolates
- Parent: Chickasaw Nation
- Website: bedrechocolates.com

Bedré Fine Chocolate is a chocolatier located in Davis, Oklahoma. Founded in the 1980s by local businessman Pete Cantrell, the company was first housed in the former Homer Elementary School near Ada, Oklahoma. The name Bedré is derived from the Norwegian word for “better.”

== History ==
The Chickasaw Nation purchased the company in 2000 and moved Bedré to a new, 26,000 square-foot factory in Pauls Valley, Oklahoma, in 2003 where it remained until moving in 2013 to its current location in Davis, Oklahoma. In October 2011, Bedré broke ground on the current 34,600 square-foot chocolate factory.

== Products, retail, and recognition ==
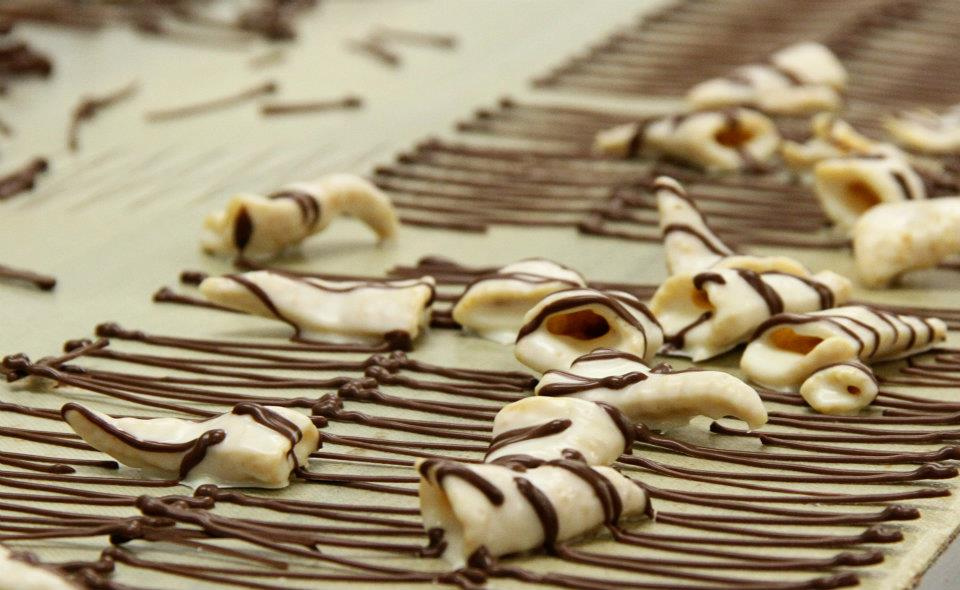
Bedrè Twists, corn cones coated in white fudge.

The company produces chocolates on site with free viewing by visitors. In addition to candy bars, cookies, chocolate-covered popcorn and caramel, the company creates chocolate-covered potato crisps and nut clusters under the moniker “Oklahoma cow patties.” Retailers such as Neiman Marcus and Bloomingdales sell Bedré chocolates in stores across the United States. Bedré creates chocolate guitars for guests at Hard Rock Hotels, and Dylan’s Candy sells it under their own private label. In the past, the convenience store 7-Eleven distributed the chocolate under the name Watts Farm, and Braum's, a Midwestern dairy company, also sold the chocolate under its own brand name.

Bedré is a member of the Oklahoma Minority Supplier Development Council, and as an Oklahoma manufacturer, is also part of the Made in Oklahoma program. The company earned the internationally recognized ISO 9001 certification in 2009. The Intertribal Agriculture Council’s American Indian Foods program featured the chocolates in Australia in 2009 as part of a showcase of American Indian foods.
