= Bill Anoatubby =

30th Governor of the Chickasaw Nation

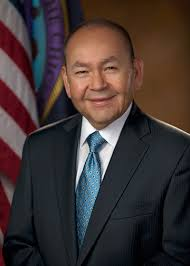

32nd Governor of the Chickasaw Nation
- In office October 1987 – June 26, 2026
- Lieutenant: Kennedy Brown; David Brown; Jefferson Keel; Chris Anoatubby
- Preceded by: Overton James
- Succeeded by: Chris Anoatubby

1st Lieutenant Governor of the Chickasaw Nation
- In office 1979–1987
- Governor: Overton James
- Preceded by: Position established
- Succeeded by: Kennedy Brown

Personal details
- Born: Billy Joe Anoatubby; November 8, 1945 (age 80) Denison, Texas, U.S.
- Party: Democratic
- Spouse: Janice Loman (m. 1967)
- Children: 2, including Chris
- Education: Murray State College (attended); East Central University (BS); Southeastern Oklahoma State University (attended)

Military service
- Allegiance: United States
- Branch/service: United States Army
- Years of service: 1963–1971
- Rank: Staff Sergeant
- Unit: Oklahoma Army National Guard

Billy Joe Anoatubby (born November 8, 1945) is a Chickasaw politician who served as the 32nd Governor of the Chickasaw Nation, a position he held from October 1987 to June 26, 2026. His 39-year tenure made him the longest-serving democratically elected leader in history. From 1979 to 1987, Anoatubby served two terms as Lieutenant Governor of the Chickasaw Nation under Governor Overton James. He is a member of the Democratic Party.

On June 8, 2026, Anoatubby announced his resignation as governor of Chickasaw Nation.

== Early life and education ==
Anoatubby was born in Denison, Texas, the youngest of six children of Opal Faye (née Mitchell; 1912–2006) and Joseph Morris Anoatubby (1906–1948). After his father died, his mother moved the family to Tishomingo, Oklahoma, the first Chickasaw capital. In 1964, Anoatubby graduated from Tishomingo High School, where he played football and was active in student government.

He attended Murray State College in Tishomingo, before transferring to East Central University in Ada, where he earned a bachelor's degree in accounting. Anoatubby undertook additional studies in business and finance at ECU and Southeastern Oklahoma State University in Durant, Oklahoma. During his college years, he also served in the Oklahoma Army National Guard. He attained the rank of staff sergeant and command of a light truck platoon, before his honorable discharge in 1971.

== Early career ==
From 1972 to 1974, Anoatubby was employed as an office manager for American Plating Company. From 1974 to 1975, he was employed by the Little Giant Corporation, working in the areas of accounting, budgeting, financial analysis, and electronic data processing.

=== Early tribal career ===
In July 1975, Anoatubby was hired by the Chickasaw Nation government, then based in Sulphur, Oklahoma, to serve as Director of Tribal Health Services. He managed tribal health programs in a 13-county region of South Central Oklahoma.

The following year, he accepted appointment as director of the tribal accounting department, where he was responsible for development and improvement of tribal accounting systems. In 1978, he was appointed as special assistant to the governor and controller. He provided program and personnel management, including supervision of tribal department directors. The following year, Anoatubby was popularly elected as the first Lieutenant Governor of the Chickasaw Nation, serving with Governor Overton James. He was re-elected alongside James for a second four-year term in 1983.

== Governor ==
In 1987, Anoatubby was elected as the Governor of the Chickasaw Nation, the twelfth-largest tribe in the United States. This began the 32nd administration of Chickasaw Governors and he is the 22nd person to serve in the office. He is now serving his 10th consecutive term in office, having been reelected in 1991, 1995, 1999, 2003, 2007, 2011, 2015, 2019, and 2023; on five occasions he faced no opposition.

As governor, he administers all the Nation's programs and businesses and, indirectly its more than 13,500 employees. There are more than 200 tribal programs and services, and more than 100 tribal businesses. Anoatubby has devised a multi-pronged approach to improving conditions for the tribe in the areas of tribal finance, education, business and economic development, environmental protection, and healthcare.

Anoatubby has been described as a modest, almost self-effacing politician who seems happy to share the credit for the Nation's successes. He has achieved the following:

- He focused on raising funds to provide more opportunities for higher education. The previous annual budget included $200,000 from the BIA, supporting 157 scholarships. By 2017, the Nation provided more than $19.4 million in annual funds for scholarships, grants, and other educational contributions.
- In 1994, the Chickasaw Nation took responsibility from the Indian Health Service to establish, grow and maintain its own health care system. Using its own funds, the nation opened a $150 million medical center, supplemented by four health clinics. (Note: The satellite clinics are located in Ardmore, Purcell and Tishomingo.) The Chickasaw Department of Health, which oversees the facilities, in 2017 attracted more than 552,000 patient visits and filled more than 1.7 million prescriptions. (Note: In 1994, the principal source of healthcare for the tribe was the Carl Albert Healthcare Facility, which the U.S. Bureau of Indian Affairs (BIA) had designed to handle 25,000 patient visits annually.)
- The Chickasaw Nation was the first Native American tribe to become a partner in the Healthy Meals for Kids program sponsored by the federal government.

== National politics ==
Anoatubby decided to run for national office in the 1998 election, he sought the Democratic Party nomination for the 3rd District U.S. House seat. At the time the district took in territory in the rural southeastern region of the state, including the area historically reserved for the Choctaw Nation, and some of the lands belonging to the Chickasaw and Muscogee Creek nations. After the Civil War, following strong migration by European Americans from the South, this area was later also known as "Little Dixie."

Anoatubby placed third in the four-candidate field in the Democratic primary. Following his defeat, he endorsed state senator Darryl Roberts, who eventually won the Democratic nomination. But Roberts was defeated by the Republican incumbent, Wes Watkins, who won re-election at a time of shifting political alliances by people in the state. (In 2003, the 3rd congressional district was totally redefined as taking in territory in the northwest part of the state rather than the southeast.)

In 2014, Anoatubby was mentioned as a possible candidate for the U.S. Senate special election that year to replace Tom Coburn, but he decided not to run.

Despite being a Democrat, Anoatubby endorsed conservative Republican and fellow Chickasaw T. W. Shannon in the 2022 United States Senate special election in Oklahoma.

== Community involvement ==
In addition to serving as governor, Anoatubby has been a member of numerous civic and governmental organizations at the local, state, regional and national levels. As of June 2018, he has served as member and past president of the Inter-Tribal Council of the Five Civilized Tribes, the American Mothers Advisory Council, the American Indian Cultural Center Foundation, the Arkansas Riverbed Authority, the Dean A. McGee Board of Trustees, Murray State College Foundation, past chairman of the Harold Hamm Diabetes Center Board of Advisors, chairman of the Native American Cultural and Educational Foundation, the Oklahoma Business Roundtable Executive Committee, Oklahoma Medical Research Foundation Board of Directors, Oklahoma State Fair, Inc. Board of Directors, Oklahoma Hall of Fame Board of Directors, Oklahoman's for the Arts Board of Directors, OU Price School of Business Board of Advisors, Task Force on the Future of Higher Education, and the Goddard Center Primary Board.

== Honors ==
Anoatubby was inducted into the Oklahoma Hall of Fame in 2004. In 2017, he was awarded the Harland C. Stonecipher Award for Entrepreneurial Vision, the James R. Tollbert III Crystal Orchid Award, the World Experiences Foundation Lifetime Achievement Award in Global Citizenship, and the Lee B. Brawner Lifetime Achievement Award.

Awards and honors include:

- 2019 NAFOA Lifetime Achievement Award
- 2019 Oklahoma Center of Community and Justice Humanitarian Award
- 2019 Force 50 Foundation George Nigh Lifetime Achievement Award
- 2018 National Cowboy Museum's Annie Oakley Society's Frank Butler Award
- 2017 Harland C. Stonecipher Award for Entrepreneurial Vision
- 2017 James R. Tolbert III Crystal Orchid Award
- 2017 World Experiences Foundation Lifetime Achievement Award in Global Citizenship
- 2017 Lee B. Brawner Lifetime Achievement Award
- 2016 Creative Oklahoma Creativity Ambassador
- 2016 Louis B. Russell Jr. Memorial Award for Service to Minority and Underserved Populations
- 2016 Helen Chupco Leadership Award
- 2015 Harold Hamm Diabetes Center Board Member of the Year
- 2015 Cherokee National Historical Society Stalwart Award
- 2015 Oklahoma Association of Community Colleges Hall of Fame Inductee
- 2015 Dialogue Institute of Oklahoma Leadership Award
- 2015 Ada Area Chamber of Commerce Ted Savage Lifetime Achievement Award
- 2014 Knights of Columbus John F. Kennedy Community Service Award
- 2014 Oklahoma Academy Key Contributor Award
- 2013 Oklahoma Israel Exchange Light, Leadership and Legacy Award
- 2013 ASTEC Fund Door Opener Award
- 2013 East Central University Distinguished Philanthropist Award
- 2013 Oklahoma Historians Hall of Fame Inductee
- 2012 Citizen Energy Advocate of the Year of Award
- 2011 Chisholm Trail Heritage Center Trail Boss Award
- 2011 Oklahoma Health Center Foundation Treasures for Tomorrow, Outstanding Innovative Leader
- 2010 International Economic Development Council (IEDC) Leadership Award for Public Service
- 2010 Oklahoma City University's Meinders School of Business Chairman's Award
- 2009 Festival of Hope Honoree, Heartline Organization
- 2009 Leadership Oklahoma's Distinguished Graduate
- 2009 Board of the American Indian Exposition Indian of the Year
- 2008 Native American Finance Officers Association Tribal Leader of the Year Award
- 2008 Oklahoma Conference on Aging Lifetime Achievement Award
- 2008 National Governors Association Private Citizen Award
- 2007 Red Earth Ambassador
- 2007 Oklahoma Institute for Child Advocacy Outstanding Service to Oklahoma's Children Award
- 2007 Minority Advocate of the Year, U.S. Small Business Administration
- 2007 Oklahoma Heritage Association "Centennial Leadership award for Preservation of State & Local History"
- 2006 Oklahoma Mental Health Consumer Council "Humanitarian of the Year" Award
- 2005 Awarded the "Most Honored One" and "Friend of the Court" by the Oklahoma Supreme Court
- 2004 Oklahoma Hall of Fame Inductee
- 2004 Jacobson Foundation Honoree Award
- 2000 Distinguished Service Award from the Murray State College Foundation
- 1999 Tri-County Indian Nations Community Development Corporation Leadership Award
- 1998 Honoree, Community Literacy Center
- 1997 Ada Chamber of Commerce Leadership Award
- 1997 City of Ada A+ Award
- 1997 Oklahoma Governor's Arts Award
- 1997 Distinguished Alumnus, East Central University
- 1997 Distinguished Alumnus, National Community College Association
- 1995 Minority Advocate of the Year, U.S. Small Business Administration
- Who's Who in America
- Who's Who in the South and Southwest

== Personal life ==
Anoatubby lives in Ada, Oklahoma with his wife, the former Janice Marie Loman, who he married in December 1967. They have two sons, Chris, who was elected in 2019 as Lieutenant Governor of the Chickasaw Nation on a ticket with his father, and Brian. Chris and his wife Becky have three children, while Brian and his wife Melinda have two children.

== Notes ==
Political offices
Preceded by Overton James	Governor of the Chickasaw Nation; 1987–2026	Succeeded by Chris Anoatubby
