= Chickasaw Nation =

Indigenous nation based in Oklahoma, United States

The Chickasaw Nation Chikashsha I̠yaakni (Chickasaw)
- Indian reservation
- Flag Seal

- Location (red) in the U.S. state of Oklahoma
- Constitution: August 30, 1856; 170 years ago
- Capital: Ada (de jure); Tishomingo (historically)

Government
  - Type: Republic
  - Body: Chickasaw Nation Legislature
  - Governor: Chris Anoatubby (D)
  - Lieutenant Governor: Scott Wood (R)
  - Speaker: Lisa Johnson-Billy (R)
  - Chief Justice: Cheri Bellefeuille-Gordon (I)

Area
  - Total: 19,810 km^{2} (7,648 sq mi)

Population (2023)
  - Total: nearly 83,000
- Demonym: Chickasaw
- Time zone: UTC−06:00 (CST)
  - Summer (DST): UTC−05:00 (CDT)
- Area codes: 580, 405 and 572
- Website: chickasaw.net

The Chickasaw Nation (Chickasaw: Chikashsha I̠yaakni) is a federally recognized Indigenous nation with headquarters in Ada, Oklahoma, in the United States. The Chickasaw Nation descends from an Indigenous population historically located in the southeastern United States, including present-day northern Mississippi, northwestern Alabama, southwestern Kentucky, and western Tennessee. Today, the Chickasaw Nation is the 12th largest Indigenous nation in the United States, with a population exceeding 80,000 citizens, most of whom reside in Oklahoma.

The Chickasaw Nation’s reservation spans approximately 7,648 square miles in south-central Oklahoma. It is divided into four districts: Pontotoc, Pickens, Tishomingo, and Panola, which include counties such as Bryan, Carter, Coal, Garvin, Grady, Jefferson, Johnston, Love, McClain, Marshall, Murray, Pontotoc, and Stephens counties.

During the 18th and 19th centuries, several Indigenous nations, including the Chickasaw Nation, were noted for adopting centralized governments, written constitutions, and participating in agricultural economies. These nations, historically referred to as the Five Civilized Tribes, also engaged in cross-cultural exchanges, such as intermarriage and the integration of educational and religious practices, as part of their adaptive strategies to navigate changing political and social conditions.

The Chickasaw language (Chikashshanompa’) is part of the Muskogean language family. It is primarily an oral language, and much of the Chickasaw cultural heritage is preserved through intergenerational storytelling. The linguistic similarities between Chickasaw and Choctaw have led to various theories about their shared origins, though definitive conclusions remain uncertain.

The Chickasaw Nation’s societal structure is based on matrilineal clans, with two traditional moieties:the Imosak Chá'a' and the Inchokka' Lhipa'. Clan leaders hold significant roles in maintaining the cultural and organizational integrity of the nation. Thee tradition of matrilineal descent provides the basic societal structure of the nation, with children becoming members of and under the care of their mother’s clan.

== History ==
=== Origins ===
Mississippian cultures developed around 800 CE along the Mississippi River and across the Eastern Woodlands with some regional variations. This was a period of increasing sociopolitical complexity, with the intensification of agriculture, settlements in larger towns or chiefdoms, and the formation of strategic alliances to facilitate communication. Organization of labor is evidenced by mounds, and the skill and craftmanship of artisans is reflected in the elaborate and intricate remains of burials. Furthermore, as chiefdoms arose within the Chickasaw Nation—and across the Southeast in general—the increased social complexity and population growth were sustained by effective and widespread farming practices.

While the origins of the Chickasaw continue to remain uncertain, anthropologists and historians have proposed several theories. One theory is that the Chickasaw were at one time a part of the Choctaw and later branched off, given their close connections linguistically and geographically. Another is that they were descendants of the pre-historic Mississippian tribes, having migrated from the West given their oral histories. According to some of their oral stories, the Chickasaw first settled in the Chickasaw Old Fields, what is currently northern Alabama today, and later re-established themselves near the Tombigbee River.

=== European contact, 16th–17th century ===
Hernando de Soto is credited as being the first European to contact the Chickasaw during his travels of 1540. He and his army were some of the first, and last, European explorers to come into contact with the Mississippian cultures and nations of the Southeast. He learned they were an agrarian nation with the political organization of a chiefdom governmental system, with the head chief residing in the largest and main temple mound in the chiefdom, with the remaining family lineage and commoners spreading out across the villages. Months after an uneasy truce permitting the Spanish to stay in their camps for the winter and survive on the tribe's food supply, the Chickasaws planned a surprise night attack on Desoto and his men as they prepared to leave. By this, they successfully sent a defiant message to their European enemies not to return to their land. As a result, 150 years passed before the Chickasaw received another European expedition.

The next encounter the Chickasaw Nation had with European settlers was with French explorers René-Robert de La Salle and Henri de Tonti. Not long after, by the end of the 17th century, the Chickasaw Nation had established successful trade relationships with European settlers in the American Southwest. In exchange for hides and slaves, the Chickasaw obtained metal tools, guns, and other supplies from the settlers. With a population of around 3,500–4,000, the Chickasaw were smaller than their surrounding neighbors such as the Choctaw, with a population of about 20,000. There were increased efforts by the English and French to establish and maintain strong alliances with the Chickasaw Nation and surrounding sovereign tribes due to power struggles in the region. Effective trade routes later became the focal point of the wars fought between Great Britain and France. During the colonial period, some Chickasaw towns traded with French colonists from La Louisiane, including their settlements at Biloxi and Mobile.

=== 18th–19th century ===
After the American Revolutionary War, the new state of Georgia was trying to strengthen its claim to western lands, which it said went to the Mississippi River under its colonial charter. It also wanted to satisfy a great demand by planters for land to develop, and the state government, including the governor, made deals to favor political insiders. Various development companies formed to speculate in land sales. After a scandal in the late 1780s, another developed in the 1790s. In what was referred to as the Yazoo land scandal of January 1795, the state of Georgia sold 22 million acres of its western lands to four land companies, although this territory was occupied by the Chickasaw and other tribes, and there were other European nations with some sovereignty in the area. This was the second Yazoo land sale, which generated outrage when the details were publicized. Reformers passed a state law forcing the annulment of this sale in February 1796. But the Georgia-Mississippi Company had already sold part of its holdings to the New England Mississippi Company, and it had sold portions to settlers. Conflicts arose as settlers tried to claim and develop these lands. Georgia finally ceded its claim to the U.S. in 1810, but the issues took nearly another decade to resolve.

Abraham Bishop of New Haven, Connecticut, wrote a 1797 pamphlet to address the land speculation initiated by the Georgia-Mississippi Company. Within this discussion, he wrote about the Chickasaw and their territory in what became Mississippi:

The Chickasaws are a nation of Indians who inhabit the country on the east side of the Mississippi, on the head branches of the Tombeckbe (sic), Mobille (sic) and Yazoo rivers. Their country is an extensive plain, tolerably well watered from springs, and a pretty good soil. They have seven towns, and their number of fighting men is estimated at 575.

James Adair, who in 1744 resided among the Chickasaw, named their principal towns as being Shatara, Chookheereso, Hykehah, Tuskawillao, and Phalacheho. The Chickasaw sold a section of their lands with the Treaty of Tuscaloosa, resulting in the loss of what became known as the Jackson Purchase, in 1818. This area included western Kentucky and western Tennessee, both areas not heavily populated by members of the tribe. They remained in their primary homeland of northern Mississippi and northwest Alabama until the 1830s. After decades of increasing pressure by federal and state governments to cede their land, as European Americans were eager to move into their territory and had already begun to do so as squatters or under fraudulent land sales, the Chickasaw finally agreed to cede their remaining Mississippi homeland to the U.S. under the Treaty of Pontotoc Creek and relocate west of the Mississippi River to Indian Territory.

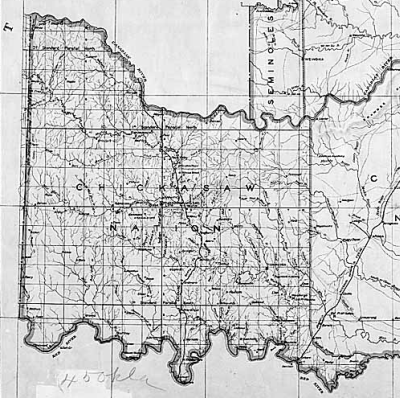
Map of Chickasaw Nation, 1891

The Chickasaw removal is one of the most traumatic episodes in the history of the nation. As a result of the Indian Removal Act of 1830, the Chickasaw Nation was forced to move to Indian territory, suffering a significant decline in population. However, due to the negotiating skills of the Chickasaw leaders, they were led to favorable sales of their land in Mississippi. Of the Five Civilized Tribes, the Chickasaw were one of the last ones to move. In 1837, the Chickasaw and Choctaw signed the Treaty of Doaksville, by which the Chickasaw purchased the western lands of the Choctaw Nation in Indian Territory. This western area was called the Chickasaw District, and consisted of what are now Panola, Wichita, Caddo, and Perry counties.

Although originally the western boundary of the Choctaw Nation extended to the 100th meridian, virtually no Chickasaw lived west of the Cross Timbers, due to continual raiding by the Plains Indians of the southern region. The United States eventually leased the area between the 100th and 98th meridians for the use of the Plains tribes. The area was referred to as the "Leased District".

The division of the Choctaw Nation was ratified by the Choctaw–Chickasaw Treaty of 1854. The Chickasaw constitution, establishing the nation as separate from the Choctaw, was signed August 30, 1856, in their new capital of Tishomingo (now Tishomingo, Oklahoma). The first Chickasaw governor was Cyrus Harris. The nation consisted of four divisions: Tishomingo County, Pontotoc County, Pickens County, and Panola County. Law enforcement in the nation was provided by the Chickasaw Lighthorsemen. Non-Indians fell under the jurisdiction of the federal court at Fort Smith.

Following the Civil War, the United States forced the Chickasaw Nation into a new peace treaty due to their support for the Confederacy. Under the new treaty, the Chickasaw (and Choctaw) ceded the "Leased District" to the United States.

=== 20th century to present ===
In 1907, when Oklahoma entered the Union as the 46th state, the role of tribal governments in Indian Territories ceased, and as a result, the Chickasaw people were then granted United States citizenship. Sippia Paul Hull, born 1852, wrote about her experiences growing up in the Chickasaw Nation. These accounts were later stored in the archives of the Pauls Valley Memorial Library. For decades until 1971, the United States appointed representatives for the Chickasaw Nation. Douglas H. Johnston was the first man to serve in this capacity. Governor Johnston served the Chickasaw Nation from 1906 until his death in 1939 at age 83.

Though it may have seemed like the federal government finally achieved their goal of completely assimilating the Chickasaw Nation into mainstream American life, the Chickasaw people continued to practice traditional activities and gather together socially, believing that the community involvement would sustain their culture, language, core beliefs, and values. This gave rise to the movement towards which the Chickasaw would govern themselves.

During the 1960s and the civil rights movement, Native American Indian activism was on the rise. A group of Chickasaw met at Seeley Chapel, a small country church near Connerville, Oklahoma, to work toward the re-establishment of its government. With the passage of Public Law 91-495, their tribal government was recognized by the United States. In 1971, the people held their first tribal election since 1904. They elected Overton James by a landslide as governor of the Chickasaw Nation, further tightening communal support and identity.

Since the 1980s, the tribal government has focused on building an economically diverse base to generate funds that will support programs and services to Indian people.

== Culture ==
=== Language ===
Chikashshanompa’, a traditionally oral language, is the primary and official language of the Chickasaw Nation. Over 3,000 years old, Chikashshanompa’ is part of the Muskogean language family and is very similar to the Choctaw language. There has been a great decline over the years in the number of speakers, as the language is spoken by less than two hundred people today, with the majority being Chickasaw elders. The Chickasaw language was often discouraged in students attending school (often even including tribally run schools).

In 2007, the Chickasaw Nation of Oklahoma enacted and began promoting the Chickasaw Language Revitalization Program. A focus of this program is the Master Apprentice Program, which pairs a language-learning student with an individual already fluent in Chikashshanompa’ in attempts to gain conversational fluency. Other attempts at language revitalization have included establishing university language courses, creating a language learning app, and running youth language clubs.

=== Religion and cultural practice ===
At the core of Chickasaw religious beliefs and traditions is the supreme deity Aba' Binni'li' (lit. 'the One sitting / dwelling above'), the spirit of fire and giver of life, light, and warmth. Aba' Binni'li' is believed to live above the clouds along with a number of other lesser deities, such as the spirits of the sky and clouds, and evil spirits.

The Chickasaw Nation follows the traditional monogamous marriage system, with the groom obtaining the blessings of the wife’s parents and following with a simple ceremony soon after. Marriage ceremonies were all arranged by women. Adultery is a misdemeanor seriously looked down upon with severe private as well as public consequences since this was thought to bring shame and dishonor to the families. As the Chickasaws practice matrilineal descent, children usually follow their mother’s house or clan name.

The Green Corn Festival is one of the largest and most important ceremonies of the Chickasaw Nation. This religious festival takes place in the latter half of summer, lasting two to eight days. It serves as a religious renewal in addition to thanksgiving, as all members of the tribe give thanks for the year’s corn harvest and pray to Aba' Binni'li'. Major events held during the celebration include a two-day fast, a purification ceremony, the forgiveness of minor sins, the Stomp Dance (the most well-known traditional dances of the Chickasaw), and major ball games.

== Government and politics ==
The Chickasaw Nation is headquartered in Ada, Oklahoma. Their tribal jurisdictional area is in Bryan, Carter, Coal, Garvin, Grady, Jefferson, Johnston, Love, McClain, Marshall, Murray, Pontotoc, and Stephens counties in Oklahoma. The tribal governor is Bill Anoatubby. Anoatubby was elected governor in 1987, and at the time, the tribe had a larger spending budget than funds available. Anoatubby's effective management gradually led the tribe toward progress, as tribal operations and funding have increased exponentially. Governor Anoatubby lists another of his primary goals as meeting the needs and desires of the Chickasaw people by providing opportunities for employment, higher education, and health care services.

The Chickasaw Nation’s current three-department system of government was established with the ratification of the 1983 Chickasaw Nation Constitution. The tribal government takes the form of a democratic republic. The governor and the lieutenant governor are elected to serve four-year terms and run for political office together. The Chickasaw government also has an executive branch, legislative branch, and judicial department. In addition to electing a governor and lieutenant governor, voters also select thirteen members to make up the tribal legislature (with three-year terms), and three justices to make up the tribal supreme court. The elected officials provided for in the Constitution believe in a unified commitment, whereby government policy serves the common good of all Chickasaw citizens. This common good extends to future generations as well as today’s citizens.

Revenues generated by Chickasaw Nation tribal businesses support tribal government operations, are invested in further diversification of enterprises, and fund more than 200 programs and services. These programs cover education, health care, youth, aging, and housing, with the goal of directly benefiting Chickasaw families, Oklahomans, and their communities.

Governor Anoatubby appointed Charles W. Blackwell as the Chickasaw Nation's first Ambassador to the United States in 1995. Blackwell had previously served as the Chickasaw delegate to the United States from 1990 to 1995. At the time of his appointment in 1995, Blackwell became the first Native American tribal ambassador to the United States government. Blackwell served in Washington as ambassador from 1995 until his death on January 3, 2013. Governor Anoatubby named Neal McCaleb ambassador-at-large in 2013, a role similar to Blackwell's. McCaleb died in January 2025.

== Economy ==
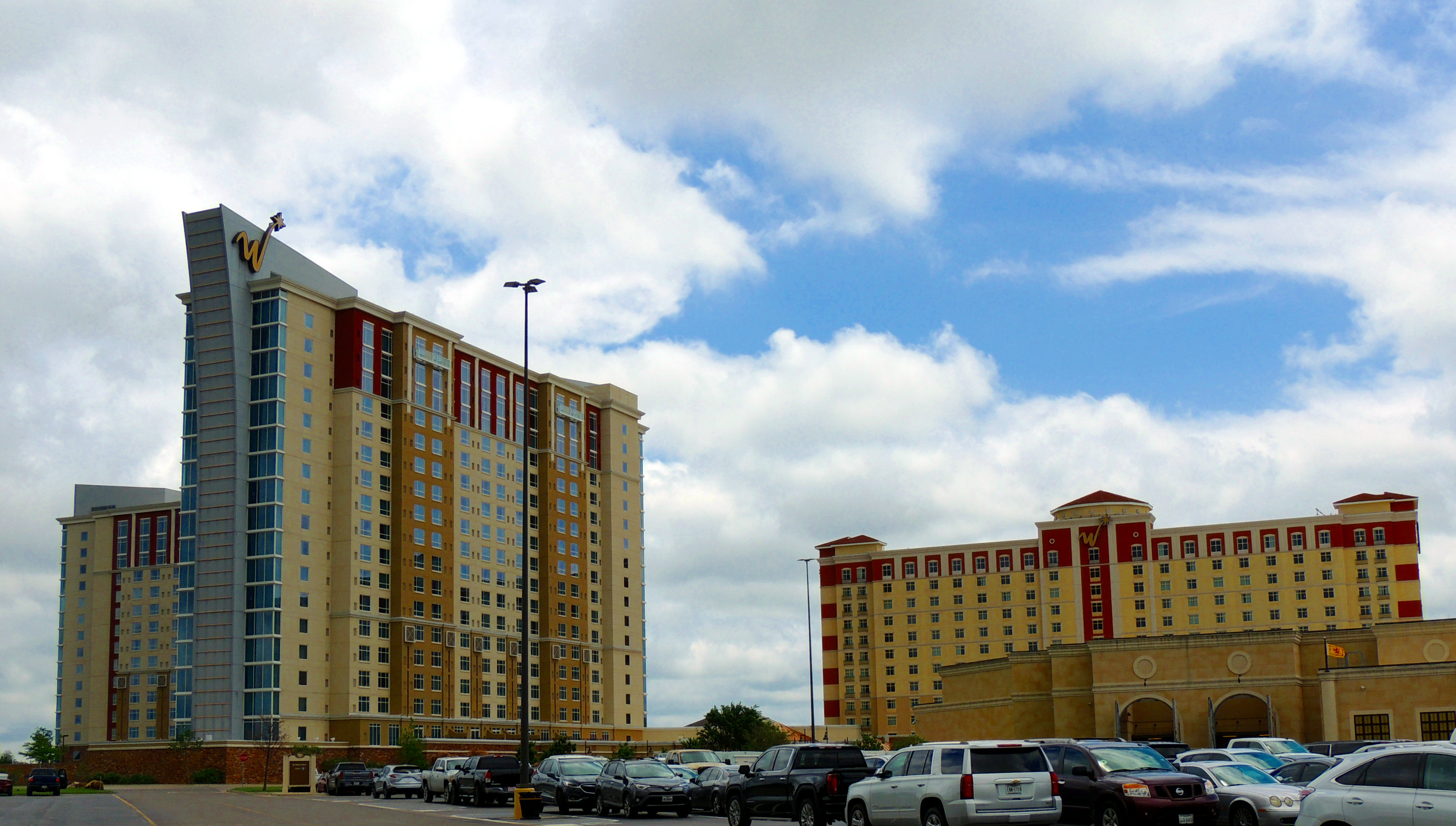
The WinStar World Casino

The Chickasaw Nation operates more than 100 diversified businesses in a variety of services and industries, including manufacturing, energy, health care, media, technology, hospitality, retail and tourism. Among these are Bedré Fine Chocolate in Davis, Lazer Zone Family Fun Center and the McSwain Theatre in Ada; The Artesian Hotel in Sulphur; Chickasaw Nation Industries in Norman; Global Gaming Solutions, LLC; KADA (AM), KADA-FM, KCNP, KTLS, KXFC, and KYKC radio stations in Ada; and Treasure Valley Inn and Suites in Davis. In 1987, with funding from the U.S. federal government, the Chickasaw Nation operated just over thirty programs with the goal of developing a firm financial base. Today, the nation has more than two hundred tribally funded programs and more than sixty federally funded programs providing services in sectors such as housing, education, entertainment, employment, and healthcare.

Governor Anoatubby highly prioritizes the services available to the Chickasaw people. Two health clinics (in Tishomingo and Ardmore), as well as the Chickasaw Nation Medical Center in Ada, were established in 1987. Not long after, many additional health clinics and facilities opened, with even a convenient housing facility on the campus of the Chickasaw Nation Medical Center designed to relieve families and patients of travel and lodging costs if traveling far from home.

Increases in higher education funding and scholarships have enabled many students to pursue higher education, with funding increasing from $200,000 thirty years ago to students receiving more than $15 million in scholarships, grants, and other educational support.

The Chickasaw Nation is also contributing heavily to the tourism industry in Oklahoma. In 2010, the Chickasaw Cultural Center opened, attracting more than 200,000 visitors from around the world as well as providing hundreds of employment opportunities to local residents. In this year alone, the Chickasaw Nation also opened a Welcome Center, Artesian Hotel, Chickasaw Travel Shop, Chickasaw Conference Center and Retreat, Bedré Fine Chocolate Factory, and the Salt Creek Casino.

In 2002, the Chickasaw Nation purchased Bank2 with headquarters in Oklahoma City. It was renamed 'Chickasaw Community Bank' in January 2020. It started with $7.5 million in assets and has grown to $135 million in assets today. The Chickasaw Nation also operates many historical sites and museums, including the Chickasaw Nation Capitols and Kullihoma Grounds, as well as a number of casinos. Their casinos include Ada Gaming Center, Artesian Casino, Black Gold Casino, Border Casino, Chisholm Trail Casino, Gold Mountain Casino, Goldsby Gaming Center, Jet Stream Casino, Madill Gaming Center, Newcastle Casino, Newcastle Travel Gaming, RiverStar Casino, Riverwind Casino, Treasure Valley Casino, Texoma Casino, SaltCreek Casino, Washita Casino, and WinStar World Casino. They also own Lone Star Park in Grand Prairie, Texas, and Remington Park Casino in Oklahoma City. The estimated annual tribal economic impact in the region from all sources is more than $3.18 billion.

From 2023 to 2025, Chickasaw nation was looking to build a casino hotel in New York City. They proposed building The Coney which would have been built in Coney Island, located in Brooklyn. The proposed development faced significant opposition with the community advisory committee affirming their intents to reject the proposed casino hotel development.

== Notable people ==
- Bill Anoatubby, governor of the Chickasaw Nation since 1987
- Jack Brisco and Gerry Brisco, pro-wrestling tag team
- Jodi Byrd, literary and political theorist
- Stephanie Byers, first openly transgender Native American person elected to office in America
- Edwin Carewe (1883–1940), movie actor and director
- Jeff Carpenter, recording artist and co-founder of the Native American music group Injunuity
- Charles David Carter, U. S. Congressman from Oklahoma
- Travis Childers, U.S. Congressman from Mississippi
- Helen Cole (1922–2004), mayor of Moore, state representative, state senator, niece of Te Ata Fisher
- Tom Cole, U.S. Congressman, son of Helen Cole
- Adele Collins (1908–1996), visual artist
- Hiawatha Estes, architect
- Te Ata Fisher, storyteller and actress
- Cyrus Harris, first Governor of the Chickasaw nation
- John Herrington, astronaut, first enrolled Native American to travel in space
- Linda Hogan, author, writer-in-residence of the Chickasaw Nation
- Overton James, Governor of the Chickasaw Nation (1963–1987)
- Douglas H. Johnston, Governor of Chickasaw Nation (1898–1902 and 1904–1939)
- Phil Lane, Jr. Educator, Humanitarian, International Indigenous Leader
- Tom Love, businessman, founder of Love's Travel Stops
- Neal McCaleb, civil engineer and politician
- Johnston Murray, 14th Governor of Oklahoma
- Bryce Petty, quarterback for the Miami Dolphins
- Piomingo, ally of the United States under George Washington
- Graham Roland, writer and producer
- Rebecca Sandefur, sociologist and winner of a MacArthur "Genius" Fellowship
- Eula Pearl Carter Scott, pilot, later elected to the Chickasaw legislature, where she served three terms
- Jerod Impichchaachaaha' Tate, composer and pianist
- Fred Waite (1853–1895), politician representative, senator, Speaker of the House, and Attorney General of Chickasaw Nation
- Estelle Chisholm Ward, educator, journalist, publisher
- Kevin K. Washburn, attorney, federal government official and law professor
- Danica Nava, author

== Sources ==
- Native American history
- Indigenous languages of the Americas
- Five Civilized Tribes
- Atkinson, James R. Splendid Land, Splendid People: the Chickasaw Indians to Removal. Univ. of Alabama Press, 2004.
- Ethridge, Robbie Franklyn (2013). From Chicaza to Chickasaw: the European Invasion and the Transformation of the Mississippian World, 1540-1715. University of North Carolina Press.
- Davis, Jenny L. (2016). "Language Affiliation and Ethnolinguistic Identity in Chickasaw Language Revitalization". Language & Communication. 47: 100–111. doi:10.1016/j.langcom.2015.04.005.
- Gibson, Arrell M. (1971). "Chickasaw Ethnography: An Ethnohistorical Reconstruction". Ethnohistory. 18 (2): 99–118. doi:10.2307/481307. JSTOR 481307.
- Green, Richard. Chickasaw Lives. Chickasaw Press, 2007.
- Perdue, Theda, and Michael D. Green. The Columbia Guide to American Indians of the Southeast. Columbia University Press, 2012.
- “Native American Spaces: Cartographic Resources at the Library of Congress: Indian Territory.” Research Guides, guides.loc.gov/native-american-spaces/cartographic-resources/indian-territory.
- Pritzker, Barry M. A Native American Encyclopedia: History, Culture, and Peoples. Oxford: Oxford University Press, 2000. ISBN 978-0-19-513877-1.
- Jean, Wendy St. (2003). "Trading Paths: Mapping Chickasaw History in the Eighteenth Century". The American Indian Quarterly. 27 (3): 758–780. doi:10.1353/aiq.2004.0085. S2CID 201747408.
- Fitzgerald, David, et al. Chickasaw: Unconquered and Unconquerable. Chickasaw Press, 2006.
- Swanton, John Reed. Chickasaw Society and Religion. University of Nebraska Press, 2006.
- "Chickasaw Nation". Southern Plains Tribal Health Board. June 24, 2017.
- Chickasaw Nation Media Relations Office. "Governor Anoatubby Says State of the Chickasaw Nation is the Strongest It's Ever Been". Chickasaw Nation. Archived from the original on October 6, 2019.
- Pate, James P. "The Encyclopedia of Oklahoma History and Culture: Chickasaw". Oklahoma Historical Society.
- Ellis, Randy (December 12, 2017). "Business Is Booming for Chickasaw Nation". Oklahoman.
- "Mission, Vision & Core Values". Chickasaw Nation.
