= List of casinos in Oklahoma =

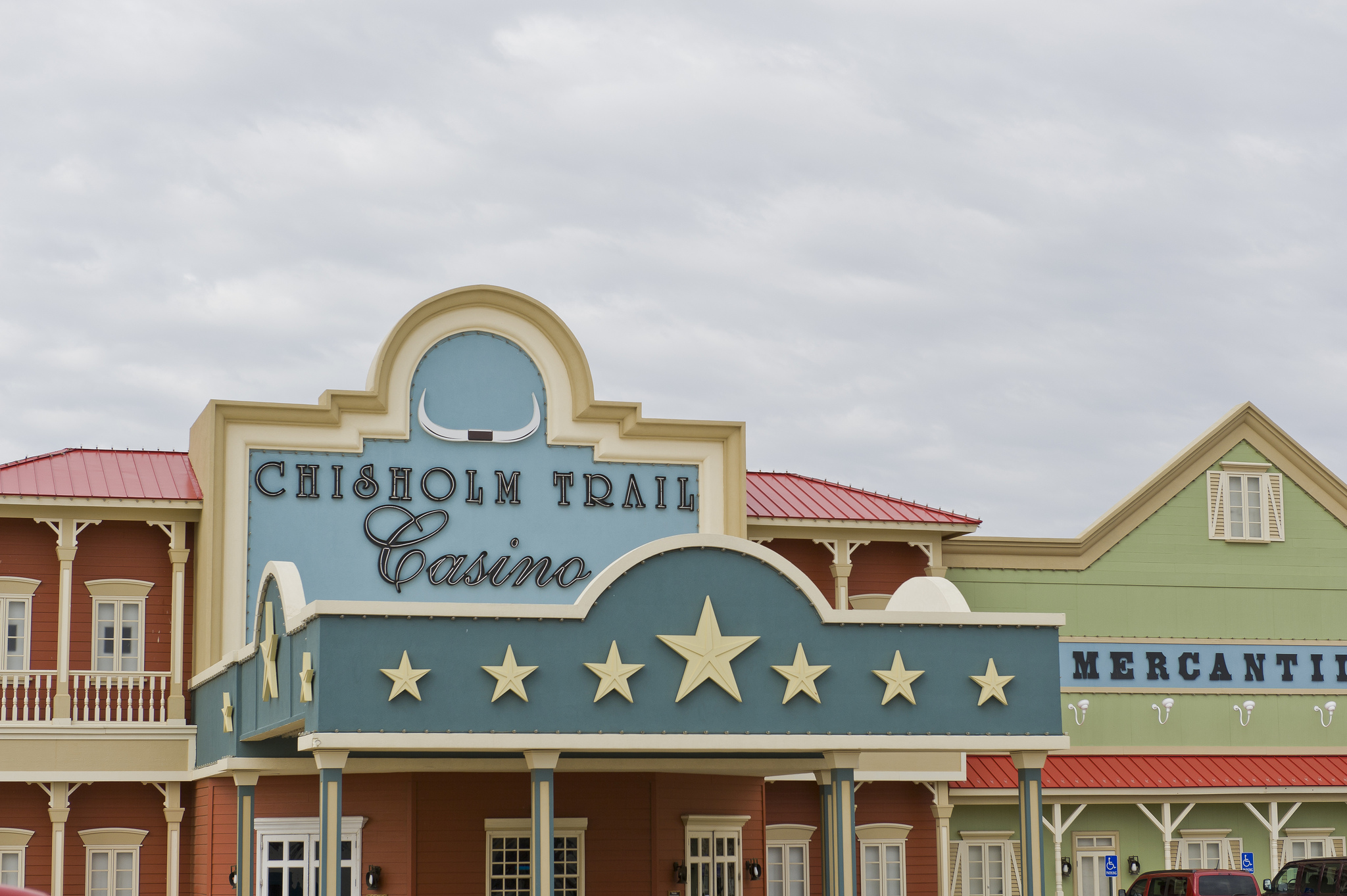
Chisholm Trail Casino

This is a list of casinos in Oklahoma.

== List of casinos ==
List of casinos in the U.S. state of Oklahoma
Casino	City	County	State	District	Type	Notes
Ada Gaming Center	Ada	Pontotoc	Oklahoma	South-Central - Arbuckle Country	Native American	
Apache Casino Hotel	Lawton	Comanche	Oklahoma	Southwest - Great Plains Country	Native American	
Border Casino	Thackerville	Love	Oklahoma	South-Central - Arbuckle Country	Native American	
Buffalo Run Casino	Miami	Ottawa	Oklahoma	Northeast - Green Country	Native American	
Cherokee Casino Will Rogers Downs	Claremore	Rogers	Oklahoma	Northeast - Green Country	Racino	
Cash Springs Gaming Center	Sulphur	Murray	Oklahoma	South-Central - Arbuckle Country	Native American	
Cherokee Casino	Fort Gibson	Cherokee	Oklahoma	Northeast - Green Country	Native American	
Cherokee Casino	Roland	Sequoyah	Oklahoma	Northeast - Green Country	Native American	
Cherokee Casino	Sallisaw	Sequoyah	Oklahoma	Northeast - Green Country	Native American	
Cherokee Casino	Tahlequah	Cherokee	Oklahoma	Northeast - Green Country	Native American	
Cherokee Casino	West Siloam Springs	Delaware	Oklahoma	Northeast - Green Country	Native American	
Chisholm Trail Casino	Duncan	Stephens	Oklahoma	Southwest - Great Plains Country	Native American	
Choctaw Casino & Resort	Durant	Bryan	Oklahoma	Southeast - Kiamichi Country	Native American	
Choctaw Casino	Broken Bow	McCurtain	Oklahoma	Southeast - Kiamichi Country	Native American	
Choctaw Casino	Grant	Choctaw	Oklahoma	Southeast - Kiamichi Country	Native American	
Choctaw Casino	Idabel	McCurtain	Oklahoma	Southeast - Kiamichi Country	Native American	
Choctaw Casino	McAlester	Pittsburg	Oklahoma	Southeast - Kiamichi Country	Native American	
Choctaw Casino	Pocola	Le Flore	Oklahoma	Southeast - Kiamichi Country	Native American	
Choctaw Casino	Stringtown	Atoka	Oklahoma	Southeast - Kiamichi Country	Native American	
Comanche Nation Casino	Lawton	Comanche	Oklahoma	Southwest - Great Plains Country	Native American	
Comanche Red River Casino	Devol	Cotton	Oklahoma	Southwest - Great Plains Country	Native American	
Comanche Spur Casino	Elgin	Comanche	Oklahoma	Southwest - Great Plains Country	Native American	
Comanche Star Casino	Walters	Cotton	Oklahoma	Southwest - Great Plains Country	Native American	
Creek Nation Casino of Eufaula	Eufaula	McIntosh	Oklahoma	Northeast - Green Country	Native American	
Creek Nation Casino of Okmulgee	Okmulgee	Okmulgee	Oklahoma	Northeast - Green Country	Native American	
Downstream Casino Resort	Quapaw	Ottawa	Oklahoma	Northeast - Green Country	Native American	
Eastern Shawnee Casino	Wyandotte	Ottawa	Oklahoma	Northeast - Green Country	Native American	
FireLake Casino	Shawnee	Pottawatomie	Oklahoma	Central - Frontier Country	Native American	Formerly Firelake Grand Casino
Grand Casino Hotel Resort	Shawnee	Pottawatomie	Oklahoma	Central - Frontier Country	Native American	Formerly Firelake Grand Casino
Golden Mesa Casino	Guymon	Texas	Oklahoma	North-West - Panhandle Country	Native American	
Gold Mountain Casino	Ardmore	Carter	Oklahoma	South-Central - Arbuckle Country	Native American	
Grand Lake Casino	Grove	Delaware	Oklahoma	Northeast - Green Country	Native American	
Hard Rock Hotel & Casino Tulsa	Catoosa	Rogers	Oklahoma	Northeast - Green Country	Native American	
Harrah's Oklahoma	Chandler	Lincoln	Oklahoma	Central - Frontier Country	Native American	
High Winds Casino	Miami	Ottawa	Oklahoma	Northeast - Green Country	Native American	
Indigo Sky Casino	West Seneca	Ottawa	Oklahoma	Northeast - Green Country	Native American	
Kickapoo Casino Harrah	Harrah	Pottawatomie	Oklahoma	Central - Frontier Country	Native American	
Kickapoo Casino Shawnee	Shawnee	Pottawatomie	Oklahoma	Central - Frontier Country	Native American	
Kiowa Casino	Devol	Cotton	Oklahoma	Southwest - Great Plains Country	Native American	
Lakecrest Casino-Hotel	Ardmore	Carter	Oklahoma	South-Central - Arbuckle Country	Native American	
Lucky Star Casino	Clinton	Custer	Oklahoma	Southwest - Great Plains Country	Native American	
Lucky Star Casino	Concho	Canadian	Oklahoma	Central - Frontier Country	Native American	
Lucky Turtle Casino	Wyandotte	Ottawa	Oklahoma	Northeast - Green Country	Native American	
Madill Gaming Center	Madill	Marshall	Oklahoma	South-Central - Arbuckle Country	Native American	
Megastar Casino	Willis	Marshall	Oklahoma	South-Central - Arbuckle Country	Native American	
Muscogee Creek Nation Casino	Muskogee	Muskogee	Oklahoma	Northeast - Green Country	Native American	
Newcastle Casino	Newcastle	McClain	Oklahoma	Central - Frontier Country	Native American	
Osage Casino	Bartlesville	Washington	Oklahoma	Northeast - Green Country	Native American	
Osage Casino	Hominy	Osage	Oklahoma	Northeast - Green Country	Native American	
Osage Casino	Pawhuska	Osage	Oklahoma	Northeast - Green Country	Native American	
Osage Casino	Ponca City	Osage	Oklahoma	Northeast - Green Country	Native American	
Osage Casino	Sand Springs	Tulsa	Oklahoma	Northeast - Green Country	Native American	
Osage Casino	Tulsa	Tulsa	Oklahoma	Northeast - Green Country	Native American	
Quapaw Casino	Miami	Ottawa	Oklahoma	Northeast - Green Country	Native American	
Red Hawk Gaming Center	Wetumka	Hughes	Oklahoma	Central - Frontier Country		
Remington Park Racetrack & Casino	Oklahoma City	Oklahoma	Oklahoma	Central - Frontier Country	Racino	Owned by a subsidiary of the Chickasaw Nation
RiverStar Casino	Terral	Jefferson	Oklahoma	South-Central - Arbuckle Country	Native American	
River Spirit Casino Resort	Tulsa	Tulsa	Oklahoma	Northeast - Green Country	Native American	
Riverwind Casino	Norman	Cleveland	Oklahoma	Central - Frontier Country	Native American	
Sac & Fox Casino	Shawnee	Pottawatomie	Oklahoma	Central - Frontier Country	Native American	
SaltCreek Casino	Pocasset	Grady	Oklahoma	Central - Frontier Country	Native American	
Seven Clans	Perry	Noble	Oklahoma	North Central	Native American	
Seven Clans	Red Rock	Noble	Oklahoma	North Central	Native American	
Texoma Casino	Kingston	Marshall	Oklahoma	South Central	Native American	
The Stables Casino	Miami	Ottawa	Oklahoma	Northeast - Green Country	Native American	
Thunderbird Wild Wild West Casino	Norman	Cleveland	Oklahoma	Central - Frontier Country	Native American	
Treasure Valley Casino	Davis	Murray	Oklahoma	South-Central - Arbuckle Country	Native American	
Stigler Casino	Stigler, Oklahoma	Haskell	Oklahoma	South East Oklahoma	Native American	
Washita Casino	Paoli	Garvin	Oklahoma	South-Central - Arbuckle Country	Native American	
West Bay Casino	Kingston	Marshall	Oklahoma	South-Central - Arbuckle Country	Native American	
WinStar World Casino	Thackerville	Love	Oklahoma	South-Central - Arbuckle Country	Native American	World's Largest as of August 2025
Wyandotte Nation Casino	Wyandotte	Ottawa	Oklahoma	Northeast - Green Country	Native American	

== Gallery ==
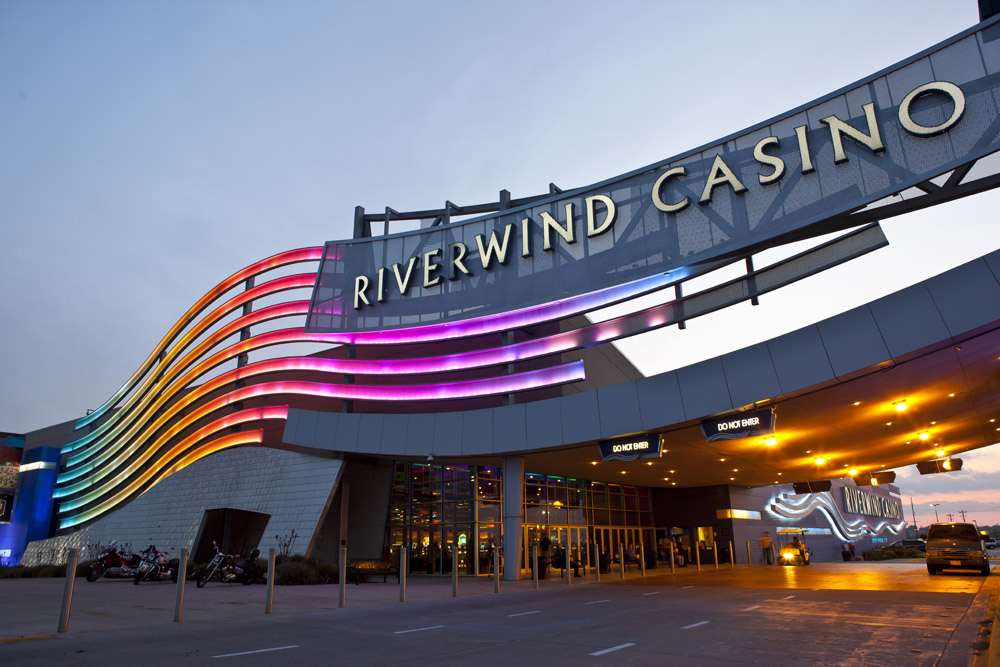

== See also ==
- List of casinos in the United States
- List of casino hotels
