= Eastern Oklahoma =

Region of Oklahoma

Coordinates: 35°N 96°W

Oklahoma's flag, adopted in 1925 and altered in 1941.

In the U.S. state of Oklahoma, Eastern Oklahoma is an amorphous area roughly defined as east of Oklahoma City and/or east of I-35. The Oklahoma Department of Tourism and Recreation established regional designations for the various parts of the state: Red Carpet Country (Northwest, being the Panhandle and North Central), Green Country (Northeast). Frontier Country (Central), Choctaw Country (Southeast), Chickasaw Country (South Central), and Great Plains Country (Southwest). Eastern Oklahoma would certainly include Green Country and Choctaw Country, but depending on the exact definition might include eastern parts of Red Carpet Country (those portions of Kay and Noble counties east of I-35), Frontier Country (Payne, Lincoln, Pottawatomie, Seminole, Okfuskee and Hughes counties), and most of Chickasaw Country (Pontotoc, Johnston, and Marshall counties, plus those portions of Garvin, Murray, Carter, and Love counties east of I-35).

Boundaries of the Five Indian Tribes in Eastern Oklahoma, 1866.

Eastern Oklahoma is generally considered an extension of the Mid-South and the Upland South.

== Differences from Western Oklahoma ==
Generally speaking:

The eastern part has lower elevation, starting near the southeast corner of the State at about 287 ft., compared to the western part, which has its highest elevation occurring at Black Mesa in the northwest corner of the Panhandle at about 4,973 ft.

The eastern part has greater rainfall, with long-term measurements of inches of its annual precipitation averaging from the 30’s to the mid-50’s, while the western part of the state goes from the 30's to the mid-teens in the tip of the panhandle. Ironically, however, the eastern portion receives less snow than the higher western elevations, with the east in the single digits of annual inches of snowfall, while the west ranges up to the low 30's in the panhandle.

The state has a pronounced difference from east to west in terms of plant cover. East of I-35 is the beginning of deciduous forests, while the west is typically limited to western prairie-type vegetation. Even grasslands vary, going from tallgrass in the east transitioning to mixed grass in the central part of the state and on to shortgrass in the west.

Eastern Oklahoma has little of the Port Silt Loam—commonly known as Red Dirt—which is predominantly in Western Oklahoma and is Oklahoma’s official state soil.

== See also ==
- Green Country
- Choctaw Country
- Red Carpet Country
- Frontier Country
- Chickasaw Country
