= Western Oklahoma =

Geographic region of US state

Coordinates: 35.5°N 99.0°W

On a simple east/west basis, Western Oklahoma is popularly considered that part of the state west of I-35. I-35 creates a north/south line through the approximate center of the main body of the state (i.e., without regard for the Oklahoma Panhandle), passing through Oklahoma City, the state capital.

However, other definitions are possible. For tourism purposes, the Oklahoma Tourism and Recreation Department breaks the state into six regions. The 14 counties of Southwest Oklahoma, called Great Plains Country, do all fit west of I-35, including the easternmost counties in the grouping, Stephens and Jefferson. But, while most of the 16 counties of Northwest Oklahoma, called Red Carpet Country, are also west of I-35, the two easternmost in that grouping, Kay and Noble, each have some land area east of I-35. Then, the department includes 12 counties in Central Oklahoma, called Frontier Country, around Oklahoma City. Portions of that grouping, like Canadian County, are entirely west of I-35. And, the department has established a South Central grouping of 7 counties, called Chickasaw Country, some of which, like Carter County, have more land west of I-35 than east.

== Differences from Eastern Oklahoma ==
Generally speaking:

The western part of the state has greater elevation than the eastern part, with the highest elevation occurring at Black Mesa in the northwest corner of the Panhandle--about 4,973 ft-- and the lowest near the southeast corner of the State—about 287 ft.

The western part of the state receives less precipitation, with long-term measurements of inches of its annual rainfall ranging from the mid-teens into the 30’s, while in the east averaging from the 30’s to the mid-50’s. Ironically, however, the higher elevations in the west produce greater annual inches of snowfall, ranging from the low 30’s in the Panhandle to single digits in the east.

The state has a pronounced difference from west to east in terms of plant cover. West of I-35 is predominantly western prairie-type vegetation while east of that line is the beginning of deciduous forests. Even grasslands vary, going from shortgrass in the west transitioning to mixed grass in the central part of the state and on to tallgrass in the east.

Western Oklahoma is known for Port Silt Loam—commonly known as Red Dirt—which is Oklahoma’s official state soil.
