= Central Oklahoma =

Region in the state of Oklahoma, United States

Coordinates: 35.5°N 97.5°W

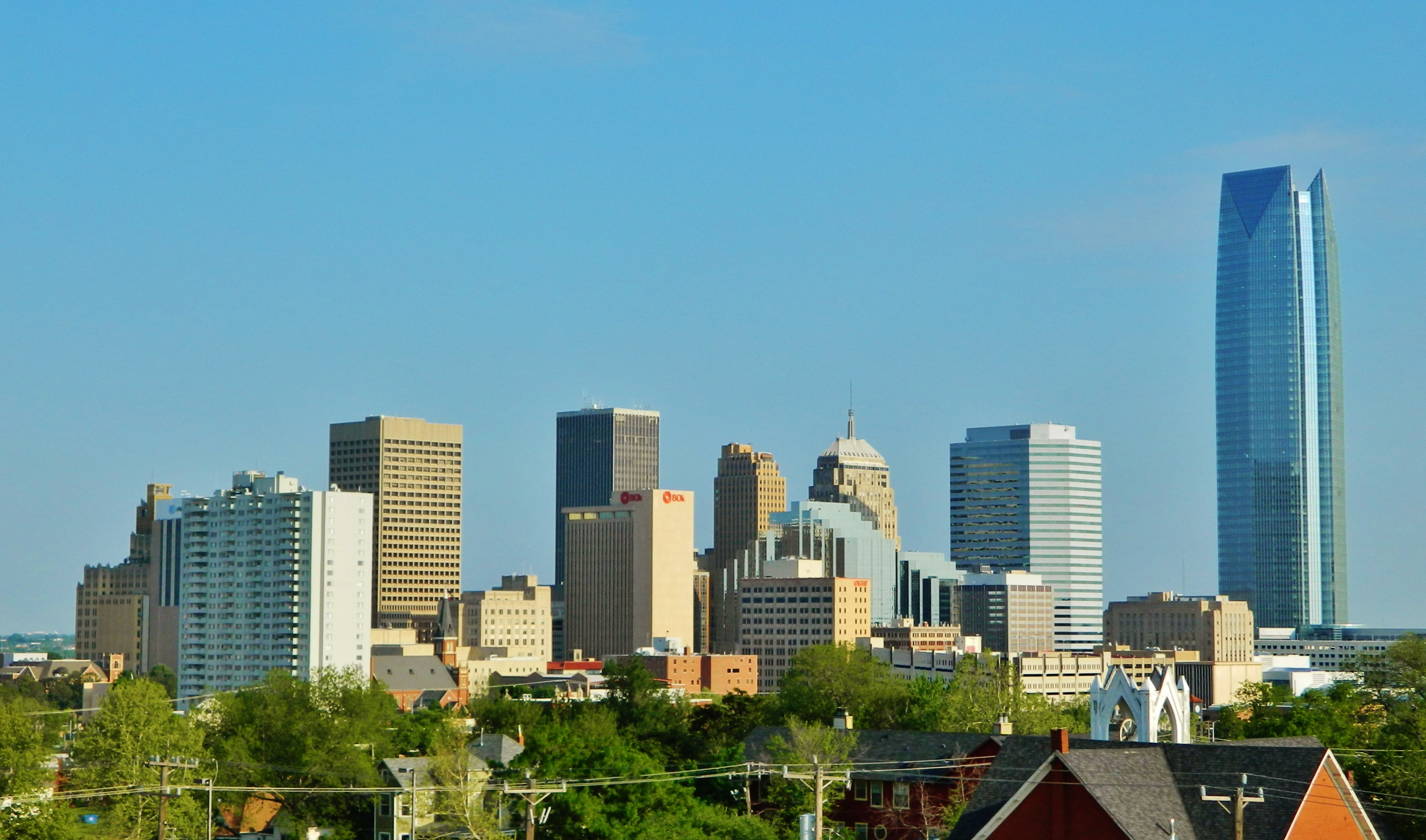
Downtown Oklahoma City (2014), the hub of Central Oklahoma.

Central Oklahoma is the geographical name for the central region of the U.S. state of Oklahoma. It is also known by the Oklahoma Department of Tourism designation, Frontier Country, defined as the 12-county region including Canadian, Grady, Logan, Oklahoma, Cleveland, McClain, Payne, Lincoln, Pottawatomie, Seminole, Okfuskee, and Hughes counties.

Central Oklahoma is dominated by the largest urban area in the state, the Greater Oklahoma City area. Oklahoma City is the political, economic, tourism, commercial, industrial, financial, and geographical hub of the state, as well as being its primary cultural center. The only Central Oklahoma city which is not officially considered a suburb of Oklahoma City is Stillwater, Oklahoma.

== Geography ==
Central Oklahoma is a humid-subtropical region dominated by the Cross Timbers, an area of prairie and patches of forest at the eastern extent of the Great Plains. The region is essentially a transition buffer between the wetter and more forested Eastern Oklahoma and the semi-arid high plains of Western Oklahoma, and experiences extreme swings between dry and wet weather patterns. Climate is dominated by large differences in annual rainfall totals, with Central Oklahoma's western boundary receiving far less rain than compared to its eastern boundary.

Because of these convergences of dry and wet weather patterns, Central Oklahoma is at the heart of what is known as Tornado Alley, and is one of the most tornado-prone areas in the United States.

== Media ==
Central Oklahoma is home to The Oklahoman, the most widely circulated in the state. NewsOK.com is the Oklahoman's online presence. okcBIZ is a monthly publication that covers business news affecting those who live and work in Central Oklahoma.

WKY Radio in Oklahoma City was the first radio station transmitting west of the Mississippi River and the third radio station in the United States. WKY received its federal license in 1921 and has broadcast under the same call letters since 1922. In 1928, the station was purchased by the Oklahoma Publishing Company and affiliated with the NBC Red Network. In 1949, WKY-TV (Channel 4) went on the air and later became the first independently owned television station in the U.S. to broadcast in color. In mid-2002, WKY radio was purchased outright by Citadel Broadcasting; in 2011, Citadel merged with Cumulus Media, who owns and operates WKY to this day. WKY-TV, which is now KFOR-TV, is currently owned by Tribune Broadcasting as of December 2013.

The major U.S. broadcast television networks have affiliates in Central Oklahoma including NBC affiliate KFOR-TV, ABC affiliate KOCO-TV, CBS affiliate KWTV-DT (owned by locally based Griffin Communications), PBS station KETA-TV (owned by the Oklahoma Educational Television Authority member network), Fox affiliate KOKH-TV, CW affiliate KOCB, independent station KAUT-TV, MyNetworkTV affiliate KSBI, and Ion Television owned-and-operated station KOPX-TV. The region is also home to the Trinity Broadcasting Network owned-and-operated station KTBO-TV and Norman-based Daystar owned-and-operated station KOCM.

== Transportation ==
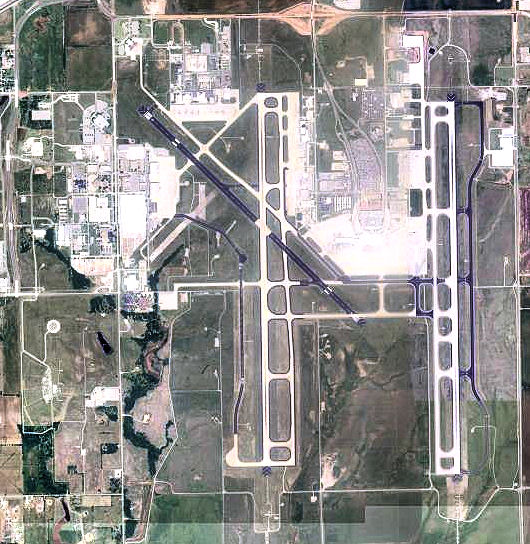
Will Rogers World Airport, 2006

Will Rogers World Airport in Oklahoma City is the primary airport of the region and the busiest in the state. The airport has one terminal with 17 gates, but is in the process of expansion. Wiley Post Airport in Bethany and Max Westheimer Airport in Norman serve as reliever airports for Will Rogers Airport. The region is also home to Tinker Air Force Base, the largest military air depot in the nation; Clarence E. Page Municipal Airport, a city-owned public use airport in Canadian County, Oklahoma; and Sundance Airpark, a privately owned public use airport in Canadian County.

There are no sea ports in Central Oklahoma, as water exports must go through Northeastern Oklahoma via Tulsa, which has one of two large-scale seaport in the state.

There are four primary highways in Central Oklahoma. Interstate 35 connects the region with Texas and Kansas to the south and north, Interstate 40 connects with West Texas and Arkansas, and Interstate 44 is a turnpike its entire duration through the region (except within Oklahoma City), and traverses from Southwest Oklahoma to Missouri.

The region is served by BNSF, Union Pacific and several short-line railroads. Daily passenger service from Oklahoma City to Fort Worth, Texas, is provided by the Oklahoma Department of Transportation through a fee-for-service contract with Amtrak.

Union Bus Station in Oklahoma City is the principal bus terminal in the region and the state.

== Higher education ==
Central Oklahoma is an important hub of higher education. The region contains both the University of Oklahoma, in Norman, and Oklahoma State University, in Stillwater, the state's largest universities. A notable regional university is the University of Central Oklahoma in Edmond, Oklahoma which is routinely ranked as the top public regional university by the U.S. News Rankings. Other colleges include Oklahoma Christian University, Oklahoma City University, Langston University, and the University of Science and Arts of Oklahoma, in Chickasha.

== Health ==
Central Oklahoma is home to the state's oldest and largest single site hospital, St. Anthony Hospital and Physicians Medical Center, and the state's largest teaching hospital and only level-1 trauma center, OU Medical Center. INTEGRIS Health owns multiple hospitals in Central Oklahoma. INTEGRIS Baptist Medical Center was named in U.S. News & World Report's 2012 list of Best Hospitals.

Other hospitals include the Midwest Regional Medical Center in Midwest City, the Oklahoma Heart Hospital and the Mercy Health Center, Deaconess Hospital, the Edmond Medical Center, Griffin Memorial Hospital in Norman, the Grady Memorial Hospital in Chickasha, Lakeside Women's Hospital.

== See also ==
- Green Country (Oklahoma)
- Kiamichi Country
- Northwestern Oklahoma
- Oklahoma City Metropolitan Area
- Southwestern Oklahoma
