= Comanche Nation Casino =

Comanche Nation casino located in southwest Oklahoma

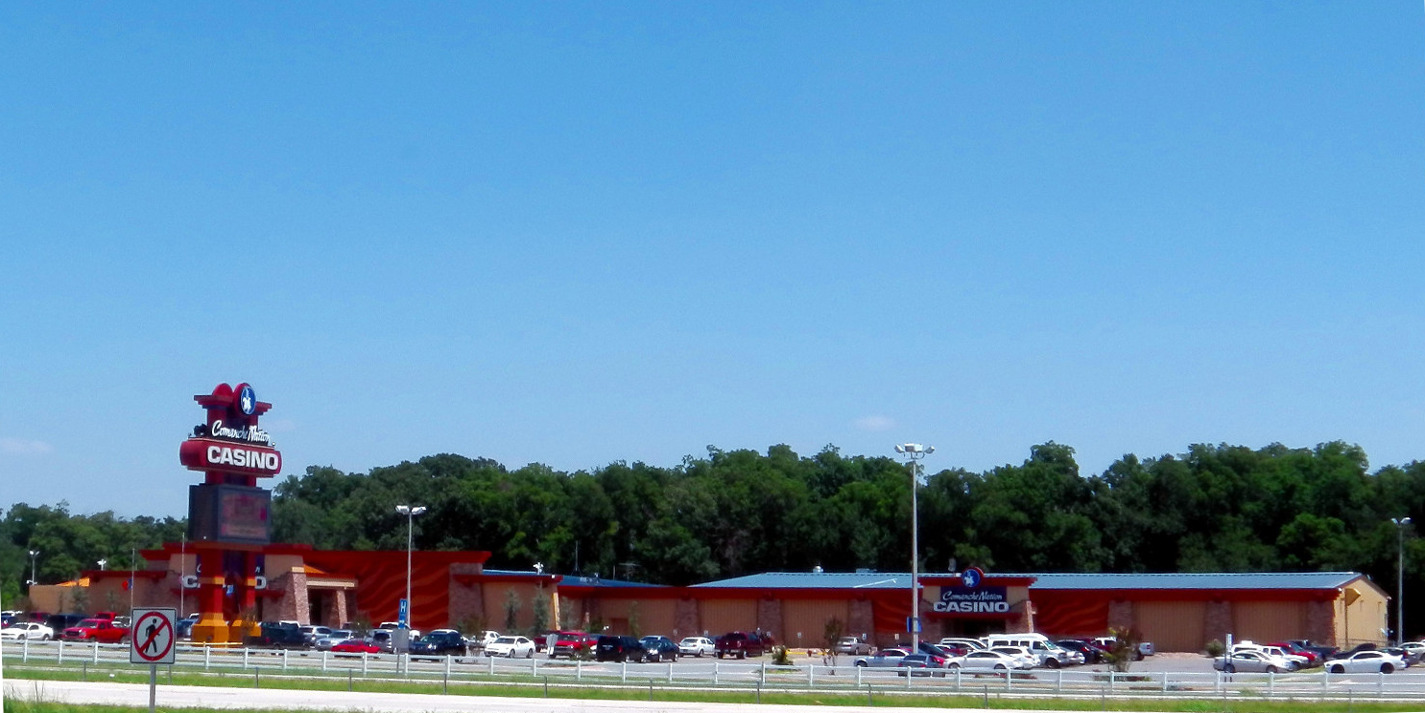

- Location within Oklahoma
- Interactive map of Comanche Nation Casino
- Location: Lawton, Oklahoma; 402 SE Interstate 44; 34°36′13″N 98°22′30″W
- Opened: May 2007
- Theme: Southwest Native American
- Gaming space: 58,000 sq ft (5,400 m^{2})
- Notable restaurants: Comanche Burger Company; Numunu Grill; War Pony Brewery
- Casino type: Land
- Owner: Comanche Nation of Oklahoma
- Architect: I-5 Design
- Previous names: Comanche Nation Games
- Website: Comanche Nation Casino

Comanche Nation Casino, often known as Comanche Nation Entertainment, is a Native American casino geographically situated in the Southwest Great Plains Country of the United States. The American Indian casino is located in Lawton, Comanche County, Oklahoma with East Cache Creek serving as a picturesque. The gaming establishment, which opened in 2007, is operated and owned by the tribal sovereignty of the Comanche Nation of Oklahoma with the governing powers in Lawton.

Comanche Nation has over 800 electronic games. Table Games include Blackjack, Ultimate Texas Hold 'Em and 3 Card Poker from 12PM - 2AM Daily.

Restaurants include Comanche Burger Company, Numunu Grill and the War Pony Brewery.

== Comanche Nation Gaming Venues ==
- Comanche Red River Casino

- Comanche Spur Casino 34.739788°N 98.394226°W

- Comanche Star Casino 34.362762°N 98.295311°W

== See also ==
American Gaming Association
History of gambling in the United States
Indian Gaming Regulatory Act
National Indian Gaming Commission
