= Apache Casino Hotel =

Apache-owned casino and resort hotel in southwest Oklahoma

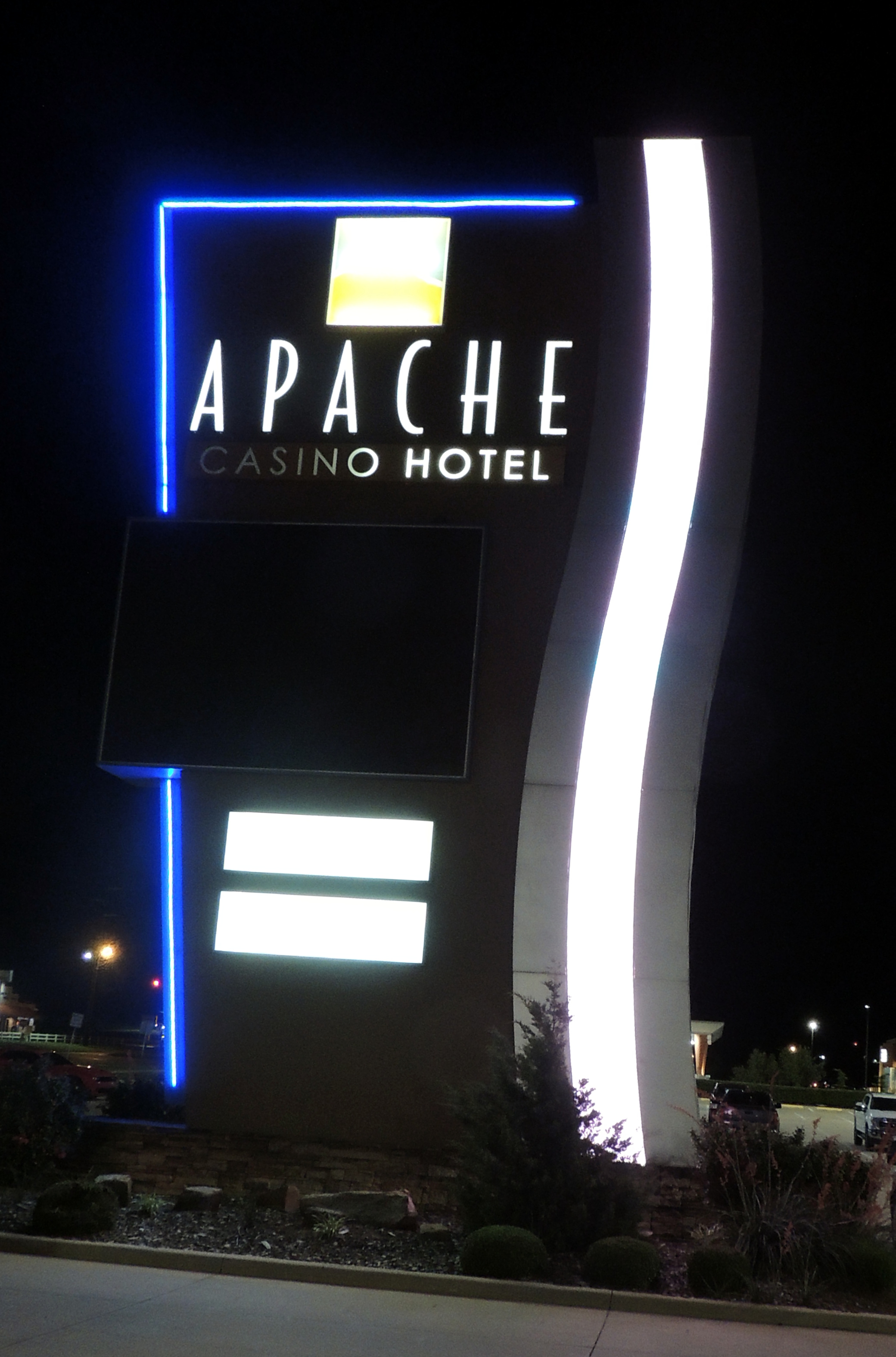

- Location within Oklahoma
- Interactive map of Apache Casino Hotel
- Location: Lawton, Oklahoma; 2315 East Gore Boulevard; 34°36′31″N 98°21′42″W
- Opened: January 1999
- Theme: Plains Apache of Southwest Oklahoma
- No. of rooms: 132
- Gaming space: 100,000 sq ft (9,300 m^{2})
- Notable restaurants: 360 Restaurant; Summit Coffee; Loft Bar; Apache Grill
- Casino type: Land
- Owner: Fort Sill Apache Tribe of Oklahoma
- Architect: Hnedak-Bobo Group; PDG Architects
- Previous names: Fort Sill Apache Casino
- Renovated in: 2008-05, Casino Architectural Transformation; 2012-08, Casino Hotel; 2017-02, Casino Event Center
- Website: Apache Casino Hotel

Apache Casino Hotel or Fort Sill Apache Casino is operated and owned by the Fort Sill Apache Tribe of Oklahoma. The casino and hotel is located within Comanche County bearing east of Interstate 44 in Lawton, Oklahoma. In January 1999, the Native American gaming establishment was introduced to Southwestern Oklahoma within the Kiowa-Comanche-Apache Reservation lands. The Apache gaming enterprise originated as a membrane structure or tension fabric building housing Class II or Class III casino gaming and slot machines.

The Apache Casino has over 650 electronic games. Table Games include Blackjack, War Blackjack, Bonus Spin Xtreme, Roulette, Craps and Ultimate Texas Hold 'Em.

Restaurants are the 360 Restaurant, Apache Grill, Loft Bar and Summit Coffee.

== Renovations ==
The Apache casino has received substantial renovations since the introduction of the entertainment and gaming enterprise in 1999:

- May 2008 – Casino transformation from a fabric or membrane structure to architectural showroom edifice.
- August 2012 – Casino acquires one hundred and thirty-two room hotel for overnight guests.
- February 2017 – Casino acquires event center or performing arts venue for commercial business seminars and musical concerts.

== See also ==
- American Gaming Association
- History of gambling in the United States
- Indian Gaming Regulatory Act
- National Indian Gaming Commission
