= South Central Oklahoma =

Region of Oklahoma, US

Coordinates: 34.3°N 96.6°W

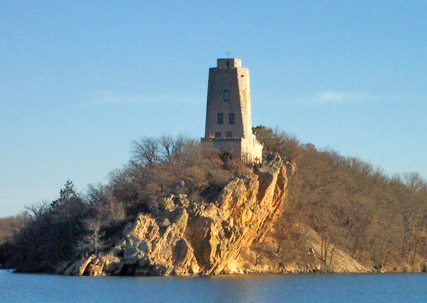
Tucker Tower, on the southern shore of Lake Murray, lies within "Chickasaw Country".

Map of South Central Oklahoma.

South Central Oklahoma is an amorphous region in the state of Oklahoma, perhaps encompassing 10 counties. It is centered on the Arbuckle Mountains, an ancient, eroded range traversing some 70 miles (110 km) across the region, and surrounded by rivers and lakes, notably Lake Texoma, Lake Murray and Lake of the Arbuckles. For tourism purposes, the Oklahoma Department of Tourism has more narrowly defined South Central Oklahoma, which they refer to as Chickasaw Country, as being a seven-county region including Pontotoc, Johnston, Marshall, Garvin, Murray, Carter, and Love counties. A ten-county definition might also include Coal, Atoka, and Bryan counties, although the Department of Tourism includes those in Choctaw Country. The Choctaw Nation of Oklahoma covers the eastern third of the region. Its headquarters is in Durant, and its capitol building, now a museum, is in Tuskahoma. The Chickasaw Nation lies within the region, with the tribal capitol building located at Tishomingo and its headquarters in Ada. The Chickasaw Nation, which runs "Chickasawcountry.com"., promotes the idea of Chickasaw Country as the 13 south-central Oklahoma counties that comprise the Chickasaw Nation, being the Tourism Department’s seven counties plus Coal, Bryan, Jefferson, Stephens, Grady, and McClain counties.

The region, also known by its former Oklahoma Department of Tourism designation, Arbuckle Country or Lake and Trail Country, has three distinct centers of commerce and culture, Ardmore, Ada and Durant, though it retains a largely rural nature, and is populated with many small towns and ranches. It also contains a large portion of the Cross Timbers region, transitioning from a heavily wooded area (with native oaks, elms and other eastern varieties) to a rolling savanna in the west, occasionally broken by cedar and mesquite trees. In addition to abundant water resources latent in the Arbuckle-Simpson Aquifer, the region has some of the highest oil and gas production in the state, with Carter County seated as the largest producer in the state.

== Geography ==
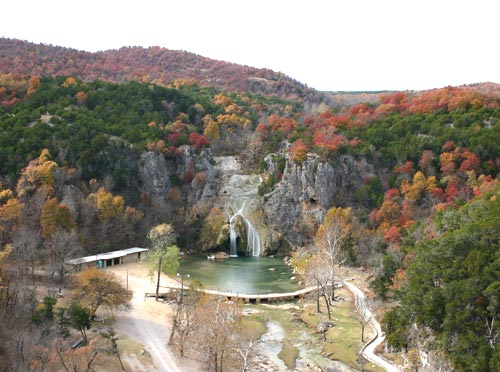
Turner Falls, nestled in the Arbuckle Mountains.

The Arbuckle Mountains are the defining geographical entity in this region, with peaks (once taller than the Rockies) eroded down to their current elevation of 200-300' above the surrounding terrain. Many lakes are also located throughout the region, often shaped by the irregular topography of the underlying Arbuckle range. Larger manmade lakes include Lake Texoma, with over 89,000 acres (360 km^{2}), and Lake Murray, a 5,700-acre (23 km^{2}) lake impounded about 10 miles (20 km) south of Ardmore.

== Tourism ==
Fishing, boating and swimming are popular throughout the region, especially on Lake Texoma, the second most popular lake in terms of annual visitors in the United States, as determined by the U.S. Corps of Engineers. Other draws in the region include Oklahoma's tallest waterfall, Turner Falls, as well as the restored historic downtowns of Ardmore, Durant and Ada. The region's proximity to the Dallas/Fort Worth Metroplex makes it a popular weekend destination for those searching for a respite from the increasingly congested North Texas region. The area is home to several popular Oklahoma casinos.

== Demographics ==
Per the 2000 census, the region had 209,569 people. Nearly one-quarter of these residents (45,621) live in Carter County, of which Ardmore is the county seat.

The growth of the southern portion of the region rivals that of both the Oklahoma City and the Tulsa metropolitan regions, with Bryan and Marshall counties (areas surrounding Lake Texoma) adding greater numbers of residents due to the explosive northward growth in the Dallas/Fort Worth Metroplex.

== Cities & Towns ==
- The city of Ardmore serves as the cultural and economic hub of the region, and is located about 10 miles (20 km) south of the Arbuckle Mountains, with Lake Murray and Lake Texoma located within a half-hour drive of the city. Ardmore is the largest city in south central Oklahoma, and Lone Grove, its largest suburb, has the fourth largest population of any city in the area.
- Also, Ada, the second largest city in south central Oklahoma, serves the northern areas of the region. It is home to the largest university in the region, East Central University.
- Durant is the third largest and fastest growing city in south central Oklahoma. Durant is located in the tourism district known as Choctaw Country, formerly known as Kiamichi Country. The city is home to Southeastern Oklahoma State University, the second largest in the region, Medical Center of Southeastern OK, and the Choctaw Nation of Oklahoma.
- Other important cities and towns include, Atoka, Davis, Kingston, Madill, Marietta, Pauls Valley, Sulphur, Tishomingo and Wynnewood.
