= Little Dixie (Oklahoma) =

Name given to southeast Oklahoma

Coordinates: 34.5°N 95.0°W

Map of Southeastern Oklahoma. Definitions of "Little Dixie" vary widely, but most stay within the southeastern quadrant of the state.

Little Dixie is a name given to southeast Oklahoma, which in the past was strongly influenced by Southern ("Dixie") culture, as its White European settlers were chiefly Southerners seeking a start in new lands following the American Civil War. In addition, it incorporated lands of some of the Five Civilized Tribes, which had been removed from the Southeast. A number of the native Americans were slaveholders, and they generally allied with the Confederacy during the Civil War.

The Oklahoma tourism department also refers to this area as "Choctaw Country," formerly "Kiamichi Country," but the Little Dixie region is not clearly defined: Its exact boundaries vary by source. It falls mostly within the Choctaw Nation of Oklahoma's tribal area, as well as some Chickasaw and Muscogee Creek lands. During the tenure of U.S. Representative Carl Albert (Speaker of the House for most of the 1970s), it was still the 3rd Congressional district of Oklahoma. Redistricting has since changed the district's geographical boundaries.

Several towns and cities in southeast Oklahoma use the Little Dixie name, and that helps to define the boundaries. A radio station in McAlester is owned by "Little Dixie Radio, Inc." The band at the public high school in Tishomingo, former capital of the Chickasaw Nation, is called The Pride of Little Dixie. When U.S. President Harry S. Truman visited Marietta in Love County in 1948, he gave a speech saying it was a pleasure to be in the Little Dixie region of Oklahoma.

== See also ==
- Choctaw Country
- Little Dixie (Missouri)
