= Ada Gaming Center =

Native American casino in Ada, Oklahoma

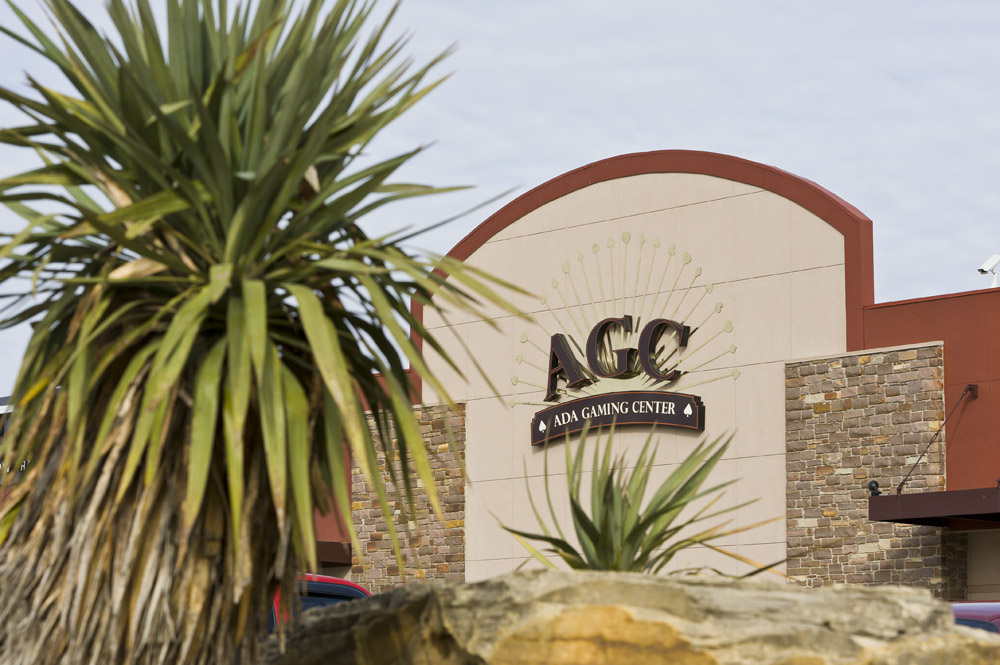
- Interactive map of Ada Gaming Center
- Location: Ada, Oklahoma; 1500 N. Country Club Road, Ada, Oklahoma 74820; 34°47′22″N 96°39′06″W
- Opened: 1983
- Gaming space: 9,220 sq ft (857 m^{2})
- Notable restaurants: Double Down Grill, Traditions Bar
- Casino type: Land-based
- Owner: Chickasaw Nation of Oklahoma
- Website: Chickasaw Nation

The Ada Gaming Center is a Native American casino in Ada, Oklahoma. The center is the first gaming facility that was founded by the Chickasaw Nation, having started out as a bingo hall in 1983. The 22,481 sq ft (2,088.6 m^{2}) facility includes a bar, the Traditions Bar, and a restaurant, the Double Down Grill, and 9,220 sq ft (857 m^{2}) of gaming space. The center has seven tables for blackjack and Ultimate Texas Hold 'em, and more than 330 electronic gaming machines.

== See also ==
- List of casinos in Oklahoma
- List of casino hotels
