= Port, Oklahoma =

Port
- Unincorporated community
- Location within the state of Oklahoma Port (the United States)
- Coordinates: 35°12′16″N 99°18′26″W
- Country: United States
- State: Oklahoma
- County: Washita
- Elevation: 1,696 ft (517 m)
- Time zone: UTC-6 (Central (CST))
  - Summer (DST): UTC-5 (CDT)
- GNIS feature ID: 1096839

Port is a small rural community in Washita County, Oklahoma, United States.

== History ==
The community had a post office from February 21, 1901, until February 29, 1940. It was named for a druggist, Mrs. F. M. Port.

During the 1930s, the Port consolidated school district covered the largest area in Oklahoma, some ninety square miles. Prior to settlement, the Western Cattle Trail passed just east of the site.

Port's population was 68 in 1940.

The community lends its name to the Oklahoma state soil, Port Silt Loam.

== See also ==
- Port Silt Loam
