= Border Casino =

Chickasaw Nation casino located in south central Oklahoma

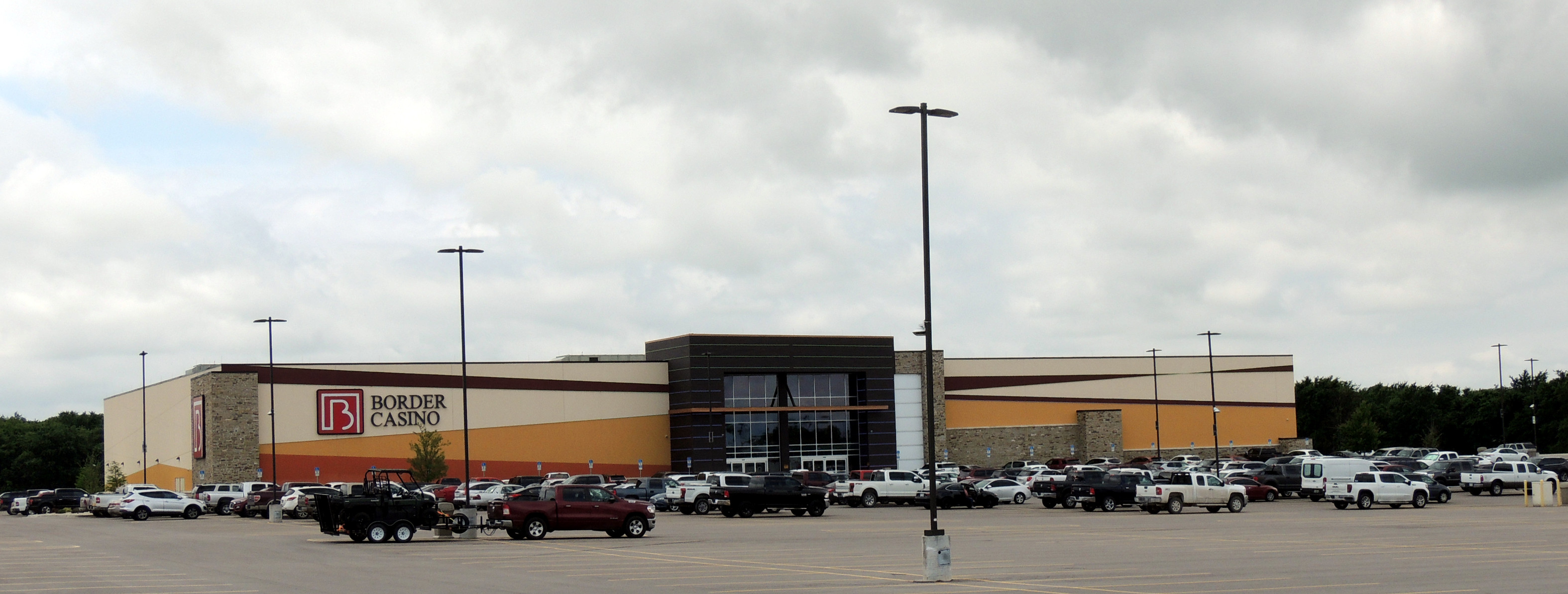
- Border Casino in Oklahoma

- Location in south central Oklahoma Border Casino (the United States)
- Interactive map of Border Casino
- Location: Thackerville, Love County, Oklahoma; United States; 22953 Brown Springs Road; 33.73289°N 97.14472°W
- Gaming space: 80,000 square feet (7,400 m^{2})
- Casino type: Land
- Owner: Chickasaw Nation
- Website: Border Casino

Border Casino is a Native American gaming establishment operated and owned by the Chickasaw Nation in the state of Oklahoma. The casino is adjacent to Interstate 35 in Oklahoma, geographically 5 miles (8.0 km) south of Thackerville within the administrative division of Love County.

The Border Casino is 2 miles (3.2 km) south of the WinStar World Casino, and 0.75 miles (1.21 km) from the Oklahoma-Texas state line. With the expansion completed in March 2025, The Border Casino now has over 3,000 electronic games. They have one restaurant, Kitchen 35 and The Bar plus a Thirty 5 Boutique store.

== See also ==
- American Gaming Association
- History of gambling in the United States
- Indian Gaming Regulatory Act
- National Indian Gaming Commission
