= Green Country =

Area of Oklahoma, US

Coordinates: 36.5°N 95.5°W

Map of Green Country by multiple definitions, Tulsa Metro Area shown in dark red, orange is the official area, whilst gold includes a broader definition with the separate Choctaw Country.

Green Country, sometimes referred to as Northeast Oklahoma, is the northeastern portion of the U.S. state of Oklahoma, which lies west of the northern half of Arkansas, the southwestern corner the way of Missouri, and south of Kansas.

== Alternate definitions ==
While the name's usage can be traced to the early part of the 20th century, it was popularized in the 1960s by the Oklahoma Department of Tourism and Recreation as one of six travel destination regions within the state. Said tourism designation is an 18-county region including Pawnee, Osage, Washington, Nowata, Craig, Ottawa, Delaware, Mayes, Rogers, Creek, Tulsa, Wagoner, Cherokee, Adair, Sequoyah, Muskogee, Okmulgee, and McIntosh counties. Another alternate usage of the term can include solely the immediate vicinity of Green Country's principal city, Tulsa; the Tulsa Metropolitan Area or the city of Tulsa proper is often referred to as "Green Country" in its own right. In this case, the terms "Tulsa Metropolitan Area" and "Green Country" are used interchangeably. Average precipitation totals in Green Country are generally above 40 inches per year. The area is also one of the most populous regions of Oklahoma, and is home to some of its largest cities.

== Geography ==
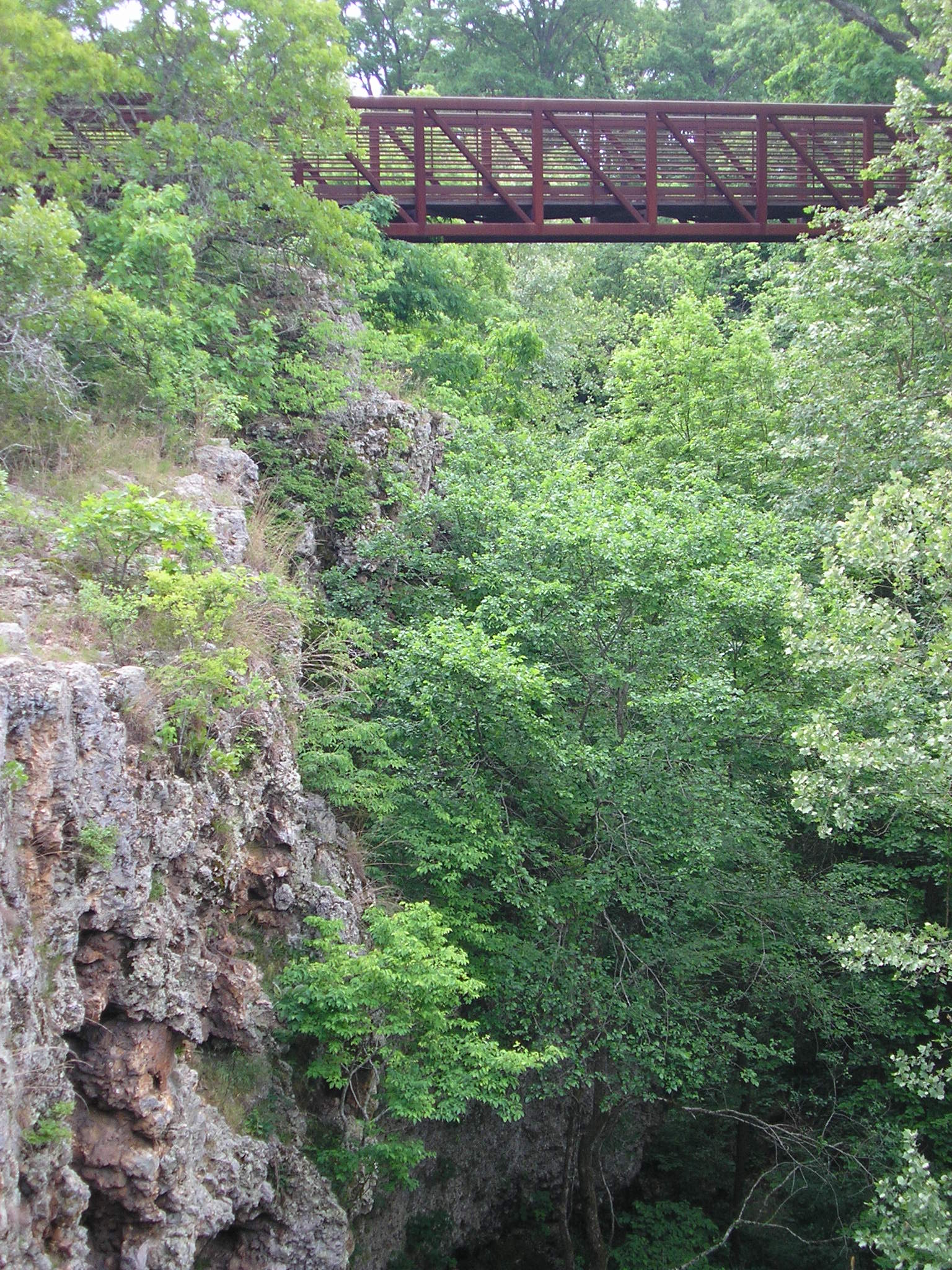
Near Natural Falls State Park

Northeastern Oklahoma has the state's second largest city, Tulsa. In addition to the area's foliage and rolling hills, it has more lakes than any other geographical area of Oklahoma, as well as more than half of the state's registered state parks. Oklahoma is one of only four states with more than 10 ecoregions, but six of its 11 ecoregions are located in northeastern Oklahoma.

The heavily wooded Ozark Mountains and their foothills dominate most of northeast Oklahoma from the immediate Tulsa vicinity south and eastward towards the Arkansas state line, containing both evergreen pine and deciduous forests, with parts of McCurtain County at the southeastern corner of the region having an evergreen dwarf palmetto understory. In its western counties, the far eastern extent of the Great Plains transition to woodlands through the Cross Timbers region.

This area includes most of Oklahoma's portion of the Flint Hills, some of which is the protected by the Tallgrass Prairie Preserve near Pawhuska, one of the last remnants of tallgrass prairie in the United States. Prairie terrain is most apparent in a strip of Green Country's northern section, which borders Kansas, running roughly from Bartlesville to Miami, where the landscape is a mix of true prairie and forest. A small portion of the Ouachita Mountains extend into the southern areas of northeast Oklahoma, though the Ozark highlands are the primary range in the area.

Northeast Oklahoma has a land area of 13,247 square miles (34,310 km^{2}), comprising 18 entire counties. The region comprises about 19.3 percent of Oklahoma's land area, and is larger than the state of Maryland.

== Political geography ==
Based on commuting patterns, the adjacent micropolitan area of Bartlesville, is grouped together in the (CSA). The population of this wider region is 998,438—more than one-fourth of Oklahoma's population—as of 2012.

The 2010 census population of Green Country was 1,301,716 inhabitants, about 30 percent of whom were concentrated in the city of Tulsa.

== Counties of the Green Country region (per Oklahoma Department of Tourism and Recreation) ==
- Adair County
- Craig County
- Creek County
- Cherokee County
- Delaware County
- Mayes County
- McIntosh County
- Muskogee County
- Nowata County
- Okmulgee County
- Osage County
- Ottawa County
- Pawnee County
- Rogers County
- Sequoyah County
- Tulsa County
- Wagoner County
- Washington County

It includes the Deep Fork National Wildlife Refuge, Ozark Plateau National Wildlife Refuge, Arkansas River, Canadian River, Grand River, Illinois River, and Verdigris River.

== Infrastructure ==
The Tulsa International Airport is the primary commercial flight operation in Green Country. Also in the area, the Tulsa Port of Catoosa and Port of Muskogee are Oklahoma's only seaports, connecting the state directly with international trade routes. From either of these two ports, goods may be transported via the Arkansas River's connection to the Mississippi River.

Intercity bus service is provided by Greyhound Lines and Jefferson Lines. Within the Tulsa metro, Tulsa Transit provides local service.

The area's highway system is dominated by turnpikes. Toll roads account for the primary highways in and out of the city of Tulsa in almost every direction. The Will Rogers Turnpike serves the city to the northeast, the Turner Turnpike to the southwest, the Cimarron Turnpike to the west, The Muskogee Turnpike to the southeast, and the Cherokee Turnpike to the east.

Interstate 44 is the primary thoroughfare and runs diagonally through Green Country, exiting on the southwest and northeast corners. All portions of the road through northeastern Oklahoma exists as a toll road, except for in the city of Tulsa. Interstate 40 straddles the southernmost border of Green Country, while other highways include the north-south Highway 75 (not a turnpike), The Muskogee Turnpike, the north-south Highway 69, Highway 169, and the east-west Highway 412. In addition, Historic U.S. Route 66 runs (with breaks) between the Kansas line and Stroud, the southwesternmost town in the region.

== Cities and towns ==
- Tulsa
- Owasso
- Broken Arrow
- Bartlesville
- Jenks
- Bixby
- Skiatook
- Claremore
- Cleveland
- Okmulgee
- Muskogee
- Miami
- Tahlequah
- Vinita
- Pryor
- Oologah
- Sapulpa
- Sand Springs
- Stilwell
- Nowata
- Pawhuska
- Wagoner
- West Siloam Springs

== See also ==
- Tulsa Metropolitan Area
- Eastern Oklahoma
- Chowtaw Country, a/k/a Kiamichi Country
