= Deaconess Hospital (Oklahoma City, Oklahoma) =

Integris Health Baptist Medical Center - North Portland
- Integris Health

Geography
- Location: Northwest Oklahoma City, OK, United States
- Coordinates: 35°31′35.7″N 97°35′21″W

Organization
- Religious affiliation: Baptist (Present); Free Methodist(1931-2005)

Services
- Beds: 238

History
- Former names: Deaconness Hospital, AllianceHealth Deaconness

Links
- Website: https://integrisok.com/locations/hospital/integris-baptist-portland-avenue
- Lists: Hospitals in the United States

Integris Health Baptist Medical Center - North Portland (formerly Deaconess Hospital) is a hospital in Oklahoma City, Oklahoma.

== History ==
The hospital was originally founded in 1931 by the Free Methodist Church. Anna Luella Witteman, a civic leader and superintendent of a Free Methodist mission home for girls, led the expansion of a medical building. Witteman, and other women involved with the Free Methodist Church as deaconesses staffed the medical building, leading to the original name of the hospital (Deaconess Hospital).

Triad Health Systems bought the hospital in 2005, after which it was sold to Tennessee based Community Health Systems in 2007. After the purchase by Community Health Systems, the hospital was known as AllianceHealth Deaconess from 2007-2018.
