= Port Silt Loam =

State soil of Oklahoma, United States

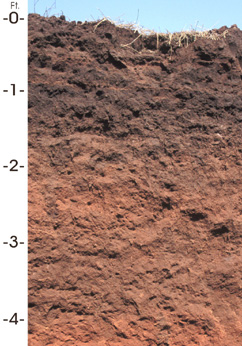
Port Silt Loam profile

Port Silt Loam has been the state soil of Oklahoma since 1987. it is found primarily in the western part of the state. This type of soil is reddish in color due to the weathering of reddish sandstones, siltstones, and shales of the Permian period. It is a medium-textured alluvial soil deposited along flood plains. Port Silt Loam can be found in 33 of the 77 counties in Oklahoma and covers around one million acres (4,000 km^{2}). The name comes from the small community of Port, in Washita County, and the texture of the top soil (silt loam).

== See also ==
- Pedology (soil study)
- List of U.S. state soils
- Soil types
