= Oklahoma Department of Tourism and Recreation =

Department of the government of Oklahoma, US

- Department of Tourism and Recreation logo

Agency overview
- Formed: 1972
- Preceding agency: Industrial Development and Park Department
- Headquarters: 900 North Stiles Oklahoma City, Oklahoma
- Minister responsible: Lt. Gov. Matt Pinnell, Oklahoma Secretary of Tourism and Branding
- Website: otrd.travelok.com

The Oklahoma Department of Tourism and Recreation is a department of the government of Oklahoma within the Tourism and Branding Cabinet. The Department is responsible for regulating Oklahoma's tourism industry and for promoting Oklahoma as a tourist destination. It is the Department which established regional designations for the various parts of the state which are in common use today: Red Carpet Country (Northwest, being the Panhandle and North Central), Green Country (Northeast), Frontier Country (Central), Choctaw Country (Southeast), Chickasaw Country (South Central), and Great Plains Country (Southwest).

The department is under the direction of the executive director, who is appointed by the governor. The Oklahoma Tourism and Recreation Commission serves in an advisory board to the executive director and is made up of eight members of the public, along with the lieutenant governor of Oklahoma serving as the ninth member and chair of the commission.

The Department of Tourism and Recreation was created in 1972 during the term of Governor David Hall.

== Leadership ==
The Department of Tourism and Recreation is led by the executive director, who is appointed by the governor and confirmed by the Senate. The current executive director is Shelley Zumwalt, who was appointed on October 12, 2022.

=== Members of the commission ===
The Oklahoma Tourism and Recreation Commission is an advisory commission to the executive director. Eight members of the commission are appointed by the governor with the consent of the Oklahoma Senate. The lieutenant governor of Oklahoma serves ex officio as the ninth member and chair of the commission.

As of 2020, the members of the commission are:

- Lieutenant Governor Matt Pinnell - ex officio
- James Farris - 5th Congressional District
- Hobie Higgins - At Large
- Ricki Maslar - At Large
- Dr. Richard G. Henry - 3rd Congressional District
- Michelle Finch - 2nd Congressional District
- Andy Stewart - At Large
- Sandra Kunz - 4th Congressional District
- John "Mike" Wilt - 1st Congressional District

== History ==
Administered by the executive director, the Department began in 1931 when the Oklahoma Legislature appropriated funds for the land on which Lake Murray is located. In 1951, Lake Murray State Park also became the site for the first of seven state-owned lodges. Through the years, park, lodge, and tourism programs rested in the Planning and Resources Board, the Department of Commerce and Industry, and the Industrial Development and Park Department. In 1972, the legislature created the Oklahoma Tourism and Recreation Department which is made up of four divisions.

The Division of State Parks operates the Oklahoma State Parks System.

The Oklahoma Film and Music Office promotes the film and music industry by actively recruiting film and music productions.

The Travel Promotion Division markets Oklahoma through regional, national, and international advertisement and travel promotion programs such as Travel Information Centers, Discover Oklahoma television show, Oklahoma Today magazine, and Oklahoma’s tourism information site, TravelOK.com.

In 2018, tourism was Oklahoma’s third largest industry and contributed $9.6 billion to Oklahoma’s economy in direct visitor spending, $708 million in state and local taxes, and supported 103,600 jobs throughout the state.

On April 25, 2022, the Oklahoma Department of Tourism and Recreation cancelled its contract with Swadley’s Foggy Bottom Kitchen, a restaurant owned by Brent Swadley, after Oklahoma Legislative Office of Fiscal Transparency found the department had paid Swadley's nearly $17 million for "financial losses, management fees and capital improvements." Oklahoma County District Attorney David Prater called for the Oklahoma State Bureau of Investigation to open a criminal investigation into Swadley's and for Oklahoma State Auditor and Inspector Cindy Byrd to conduct a forensic audit.

== Organization ==
- Executive Director
  - Administrative Services Division - central offices of the Department, coordinates the fiscal activities of the operating divisions, provides financial information, fiscal control, and payroll, personnel, purchasing, and vendor payment services.
  - State Parks Division - operates the state parks, lodges and golf courses under the jurisdiction and control of the Department, researches and develops statistical information and economic development and planning assistance to the Department and to communities throughout the state, and also administers federal grant funds for outdoor recreational development
  - Travel Promotion Division - formulates information and marketing plans and programs designed to attract tourists to the state and oversees the dissemination of information concerning the State's public and private attractions, lodges, parks and recreational facilities, provides assistance to cities, public and private associations and organizations in the promotion of special events of local or historical interest and in the solicitation of conferences, meetings and conventions. Maintains the official Oklahoma travel and tourism website. The division is also responsible for publication of Oklahoma Today magazine and production of Discover Oklahoma television show, which airs weekly on network stations in Oklahoma and north Texas.
  - Oklahoma Film and Music Division- works with in-state and out-of-state music and film industry officials to promote, support and expand the music and film activity in the state of Oklahoma

== See also ==
- List of Oklahoma state parks
