= History of gambling in the United States =

The history of gambling in the United States covers gambling and gaming since the colonial period. The overall theme is one of a general lack of formal regulation (but sometimes significant religious or moral disapproval), giving way by degrees to widespread prohibition by the early 20th century, followed by a loosening of restrictions in the late 20th and early 21st centuries.

== Colonial ==
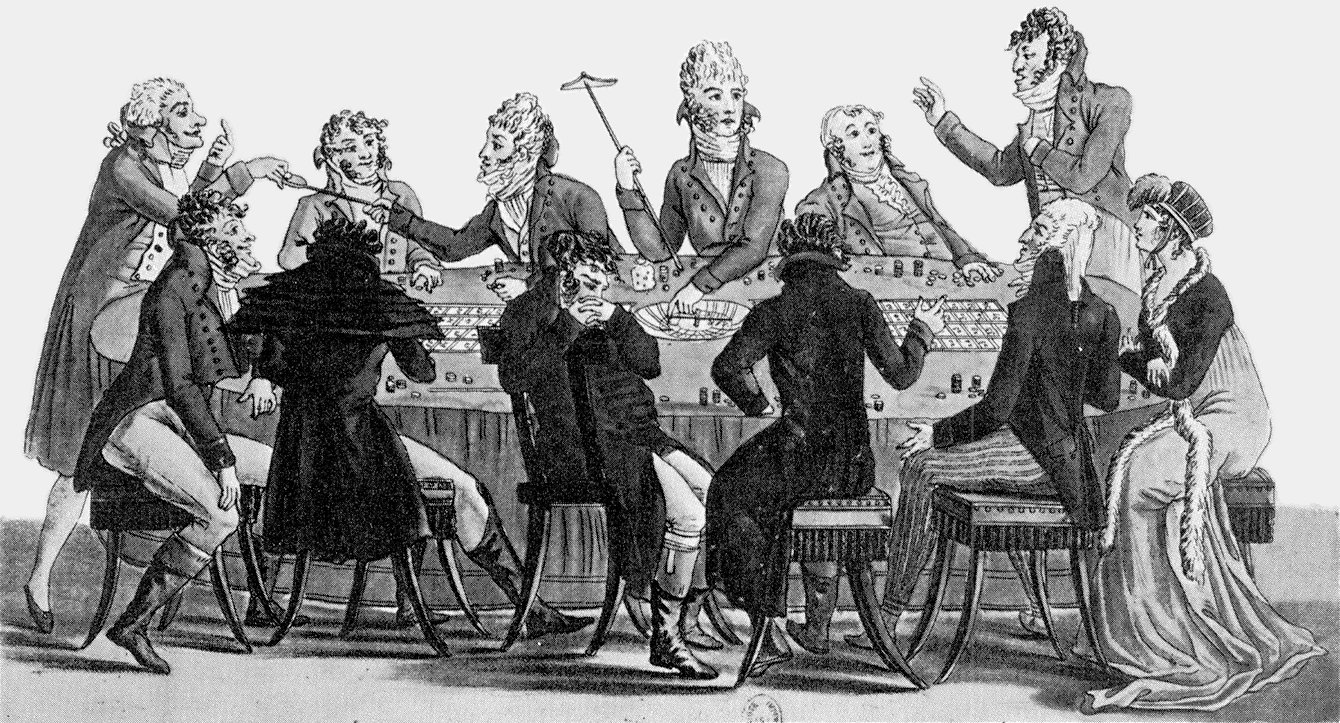
Caricature of gambling, showing a number of men — and one woman — at an early roulette table, ca. 1800.

Games of chance came to the British-American colonies with the first settlers. Attitudes toward gambling varied greatly from community to community, but there were no large-scale restrictions on the practice at the time. Colonies with conservative religious traditions (such as Puritanism in Massachusetts) tended to frown on gambling, which was sometimes prohibited or restricted by law.

By the 1680s, an emerging upper class in Virginia cemented their economic status through an iron grip on gambling in horse racing. Heavy betters demonstrated their courage and skill while promoting a sense of shared values and consciousness among the social elite. This group of wealthy Virginian landowners made elaborate rules, established by formal codes that dictated how much to bet, and marginalized the role of the non-elite. They developed a code of honor regarding acquisitiveness, individualism, materialism, personal relationships, and the right to be rulers. Not until the mid-18th century, when Baptists and Methodists denounced gambling as sinful, was there any challenge to the social, political, and economic dominance of this Virginian over-class.

Historian Neal Millikan found approximately 392 lotteries that were held in the 13 colonies using newspaper advertisements in the colonial era.

Lotteries were used not only as a form of entertainment but as a source of revenue to help fund each of the original 13 colonies. The financiers of Jamestown, Virginia funded lotteries to raise money to support their colony. These lotteries often featured instant winners. In 1769, a restriction was placed on lotteries by the British Crown and became one of many issues that fueled tensions between the Colonies and Britain before the American Revolution.

== Early national trends ==
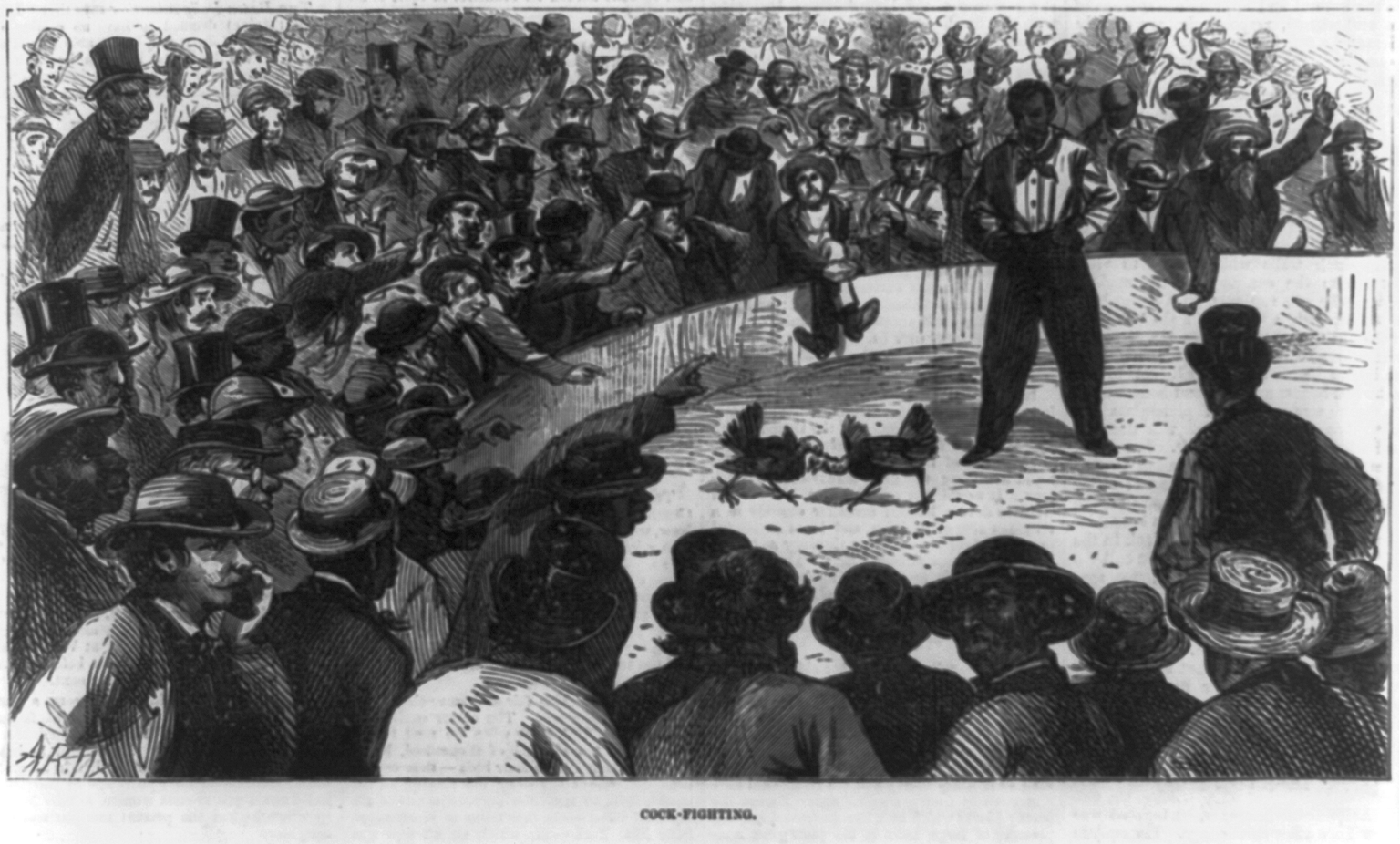
A Sunday cock-fighting event in early New Orleans.

Lotteries continued to be used at the state and federal level in pre-revolutionary America. New Orleans emerged as the nation's leading gambling center. A wave of hostility against the sinfulness of gambling emerged in the religious revivals that comprised the Second Great Awakening and the Third Great Awakening. Moralists concentrated on state legislatures, passing laws to restrict gambling, pleasure halls, horse racing, and violations of the Sabbath (working on Sundays). Despite the attempted restrictions, gambling houses grew in popularity in various communities across the colonies. Local judge Jacob Rush told men "that not all sports were banned, only those associated with gambling. Unadulterated amusement was permissible". Rush continued to condemn gambling as immoral, because "it tyrannises the people beyond their control, reducing them to poverty and wretchedness. The mind is deeply contaminated, and sentiments, the most hostile to its final peace and happiness, are harbored and indulged."

English writer Harriet Martineau described the deportment and social station of a professional gambler she encountered while traveling through modern-day West Virginia to the then-burgeoning spa town of White Sulphur Springs:

One of the personages whom I referred to as low company, at the beginning of my story, declared himself in the stage-coach to be a gambler, about to visit the Springs for professional purposes. He said to another man, who looked fit company for him, that he played higher at faro than any man in the country but one. These two men slept while we were mounting to the Hawk's Nest. People who pursue their profession by night, as such people do, must sleep in the day, happen what may. They were rather self-important during the journey; it was a comfort to see how poor a figure they cut at the Springs. They seemed to sink into the deepest insignificance that could be desired. Such persons are the pests of society in the south and west; and they are apt to boast that their profession is highly profitable in the eastern cities. I fear this is no empty vaunt.

Gambling was made illegal and forced to relocate to safe havens such as New Orleans or on riverboats where the captain was the only law in force. Anti-gambling movements shut down the lotteries. As railroads replaced riverboat travel, other venues were closed. The increasing pressure of legal prohibitions on gambling created risks and opportunities for illegal operations.

== Frontier ==
From 1848 to 1855, the California Gold Rush attracted ambitious young prospectors from around the world, to prospect for gold and gamble away were two sides of their manliness. By the 1850s, the influx of aspiring prospectors had made San Francisco a world-famous city. San Francisco had overtaken New Orleans as the gambling capital of the US. However, as respectability set in, California gradually strengthened its laws and its policing of gambling; the games went underground.

Gambling was popular on the frontier during the settlement of the West; nearly everyone participated in games of chance. Towns at the end of the cattle trails such as Deadwood, South Dakota or Dodge City, Kansas, and major railway hubs such as Kansas City and Denver were famous for their many lavish gambling houses. Frontier gamblers had become the local elite. At the top of the line, riverboat gamblers dressed smartly, wore expensive jewelry, and exuded refined respectability.

== Late 19th century ==
=== Horse racing ===
Horse racing started as an expensive hobby for the very rich, especially in the South, but the Civil War destroyed the affluence it rested upon. The sport made a come back in the Northeast, under the leadership of elite jockey clubs that operated the most prestigious racetracks. As a spectator sport, the races attracted an affluent audience, as well as struggling, working-class gamblers. The racetracks closely controlled the situation to prevent fraud and keep the sport honest. Off-track, bookmakers relied upon communication systems such as the telegraph and a system of runners which attracted a much wider audience. However, the bookmakers paid off the odds that were set honestly at the racetrack.

=== Chicago ===
In Chicago, like other rapidly growing industrial centers with large immigrant and migrant working-class neighborhoods, gambling was a major issue, and in some contexts a vice. The city's wealthy urban elite had private clubs and closely supervised horse racing tracks. The workers, who discovered freedom and independence in gambling, discovered a world apart from their closely supervised factory jobs. They gambled to validate the risk-taking aspect of masculinity, betting heavily on dice, card games, policy, and cockfights. Already by the 1850s, hundreds of saloons offered gambling opportunities, including off-track betting on the horses. Historian Mark Holler, argues that organized crime provided upward mobility to ambitious people in poverty-stricken non-white communities. The high-income, high-visibility vice lords and racketeers built their careers and profits in these low-income neighborhoods, often branching into local politics to protect their domains. For example, in 1868–1888, Chicago linchpin, Michael C. McDonald—"The Gambler King of Clark Street"—kept numerous Democratic machine politicians on expense accounting to protect his gambling empire and keep the reformers at bay.

In larger cities, the exploitation, inherent in illegal gambling and prostitution, was restricted to geographically segregated red-light districts. The business owners, both legitimate and illicit, were pressured into making scheduled payments to corrupt police and politicians, which they disguised as a licensing expense. The informal rates became standardized, for example, in Chicago in 1912, in ranges of $20 a month for a cheap brothel to $1000 a month for luxurious bordellos. Reformist elements never accepted the segregated vice districts and they wanted them all permanently shut down. In large cities, an influential system of racketeers and a vicious clique of vice lords was economically, socially and politically powerful enough to keep the reformers and upright law-enforcement at bay. Finally, around 1900–1910, the reformers with the support of law enforcement and legislative backing, grew politically strong enough to shut down the destructive system of vice and the survivors went underground.

== 20th century ==
=== Numbers racket ===
Segregated neighborhoods in larger cities starting in the late 19th century were the scene of numerous underground "numbers games", typically controlled by criminals who paid off the local police, they operated out of inconspicuous "policy shops" usually a saloon, where bettors chose numbers. In 1875, a report of a select committee of the New York State Assembly stated that "the lowest, meanest, worst form ... [that] gambling takes in the city of New York, is what is known as policy playing". The game was also popular in Italian neighborhoods known as the Italian lottery, and it was known in Cuban communities as bolita ("little ball"). In the early 20th century, the game was associated with big-city slums and could be played for pennies. The bookies would even extend credit, and there were no deductions for taxes. Illegal gambling, which had the same organizers and support systems as illegal liquors in the 1920s, lead to powerful criminal syndicates in most large cities.

=== Reformers ===
Reformers led by the evangelical (Protestant) Christian movement, succeeded in passing state laws that closed nearly all the race tracks by 1917. However, slot machines, gambling houses, betting parlors, and policy games flourished, just as illegal alcohol did during Prohibition. Horse-racing made their comeback in the 1920s, as state governments legalized on-track betting as a popular source for state revenue and legalized off-track betting regained its popularity.

The Great Depression saw the legalization of some forms of gambling such as bingo in some cities to allow churches and charities to raise money, but most gambling remained illegal. In the 1930s, 21 states opened race tracks.

=== Localities ===
Some cities such as Miami, the "Free State of Galveston in Texas," and Hot Springs, Arkansas, became regional gambling centers, attracting gamblers from more prudish rural areas.

==== New York City ====
At the turn-of-the-century in 1900, gambling was illegal but widespread in New York City. The favorite activities included games of chance such as cards, dice and numbers, and betting on sports events, chiefly horse racing. In the upper class, gambling was handled discreetly in the expensive private clubs, the most famous of which was operated by Richard Canfield, who operated the Saratoga Club. Prominent players included Reggie Vanderbilt and John Bet-a-Million Gates. The chief competitor to Canfield was the "Bronze Door," operated 1891–1917, by a syndicate of gamblers closely linked to the Democratic machine represented by Tammany Hall. These elite establishments were illegal and paid off the police and politicians as needed. The working-class was served by hundreds of neighborhood gambling parlors, featuring faro card games, and the omnipresent policy shops where poor folks could bet a few pennies on the daily numbers, and be quickly paid off so they could gamble again. Betting on horse racing was allowed only at the tracks themselves, where the controls were tight. The most famous venue was Belmont Park, a complex of five racecourses, a 12,000 seat grandstand, and multiple stables, centred around a lavish clubhouse. Middle-class gamblers could frequent the city's race tracks, but the center of middle-class moral gravity was strongly opposed to all forms of gambling. The reform movements were strongest in the 1890s. They were led by men such as the Reverend Charles H. Parkhurst, the leading Presbyterian pastor and president of the New York Society for the Prevention of Crime; reform mayor William L. Strong, and his police commissioner Theodore Roosevelt. Reformers passed laws in the state legislature against any emerging gambling venue. Such laws were enforced in most of the small towns and rural areas, but not in New York's larger cities, where political machines controlled the police and the courts.

Another common gambling activity during this period was betting on political elections. Betting on United States presidential elections from around 1868 to 1940 was practiced on a large scale, centered on New York City, which conducted an estimated half of the activity. The money spent on election betting even occasionally exceeded trading done on the stock exchanges of Wall Street. The odds from the betting markets were often used as a way to predict the outcome of an election. Election betting generally declined leading up to the Second World War, due to a combination of factors, including increased legal restrictions, being crowded out by horse betting, and the rise of scientific polling like Gallup, which correctly predicted the outcome of the 1940 election.

==== Saratoga Springs ====
After 1870, Saratoga Springs, near Albany in upstate New York, became the nation's top upscale resort relying on natural mineral springs, horse racing, gambling, and luxury hotels, according to Janet Paraschos. World War II imposed severe travel restrictions which kept the vast majority of gamblers away and financially ruined the establishments. Since 1970, there has been a revival of legal betting with a renovated racetrack, a 28-day exclusive racing season, a new interstate, winter sports opportunities, and an influx of vacationing young professionals.

==== Cleveland ====
Horse racing has a long history in Cleveland, as elites by the 1860s, worked to keep gamblers and criminals at bay.

The Mayfield Road Mob, based in the Little Italy district, became a powerful local crime syndicate in the 1920s and 1930s, through bootlegging and illegal gambling. Local gangsters worked deals with the Jewish-Cleveland Syndicate, which operated laundries, casinos, and nightclubs. Both groups profited from illegal gambling, bookmaking, loan sharking, and labor rackets in northern Ohio.

The "Harvard Club" (named after its Harvard street location in the Cleveland suburbs) operated in 1930–41, as one of the largest gambling operations attracting customers from as far as New York and Chicago. It moved to different locations on Harvard Street, which accommodated 500–1,000 gamblers who came to shoot craps and to play the slot machines, roulette, and all-night poker. It defied numerous raids until it was finally shut down by Frank Lausche in 1941.

Eliot Ness, after building a crime-fighting national reputation in Chicago, took on Cleveland, 1934–1942. He tried to suppress labor-union protection rackets, illegal liquor suppliers, and gambling, but his reputation suffered.

=== Legalization in states ===
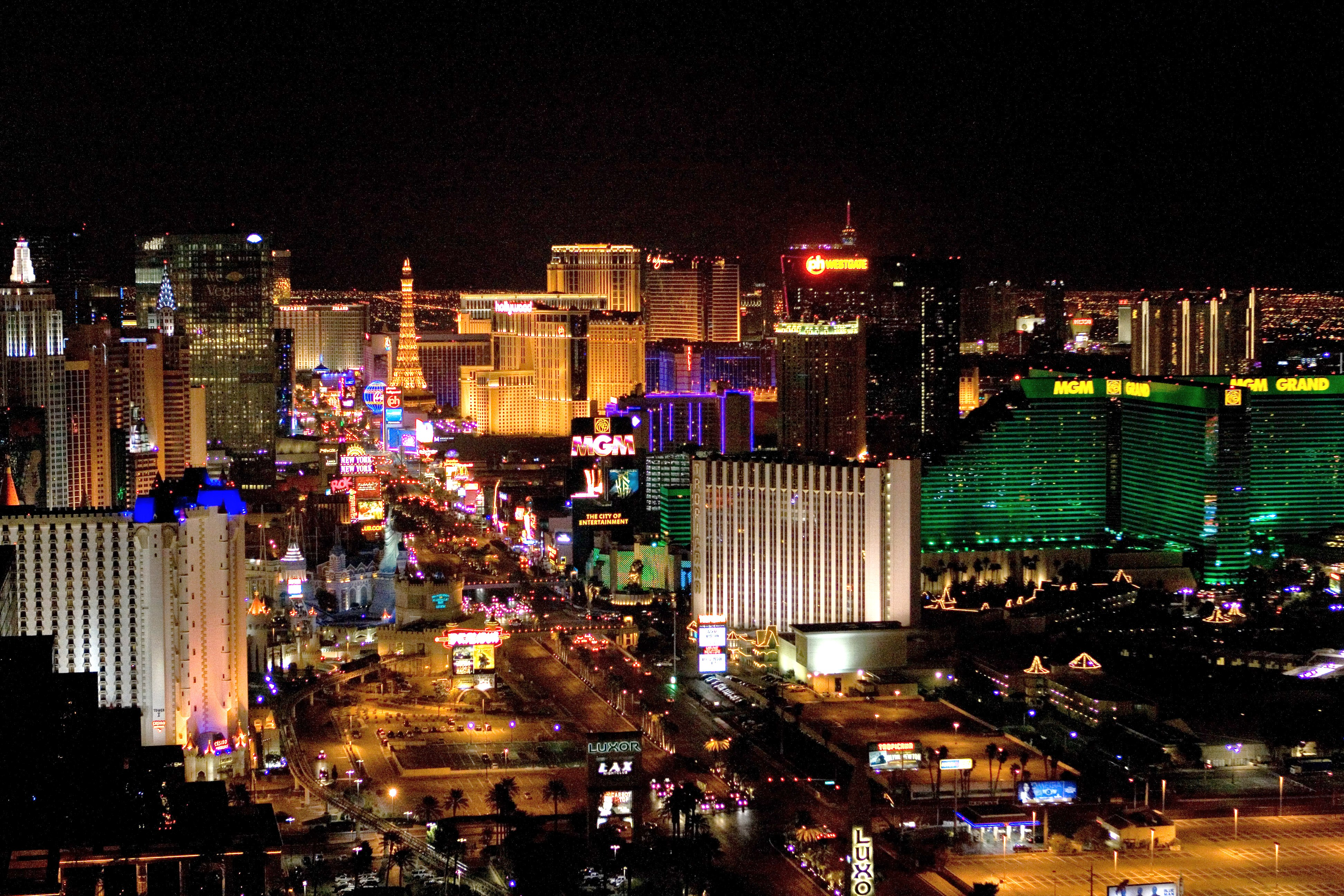
The Las Vegas Strip became the nation's casino capital.

To overcome the Great Depression, Nevada legalized gambling as a way to bring economic relief. In 1931, Nevada legalized most forms of gambling when Assembly Bill 98 was signed into law, providing a source of revenue for the state. Interest in development in the state was slow at first, as Nevada had a small population. After 1945, enforcement of gambling laws became more strict nationwide, and the resort town of Las Vegas became an attractive target for investment by crime figures such as New York's Bugsy Siegel. The town rapidly developed during the 1950s, dooming some illegal gambling venues such as Galveston. Thanks to cheap air travel and auto access from California, the state of Nevada, and Las Vegas in particular, became the center of gambling in the United States. In the 1960s, Howard Hughes and other legitimate investors purchased many of the most important hotels and casinos in the city, gradually eliminating the its connections to organized crime.

In 1948, Stafford King led an unsuccessful campaign for governor of Minnesota on a platform of legalizing gambling. If unable to fully legalize gambling, he planned on repealing the anti-gambling laws signed by the incumbent governor, Luther Youngdahl.

Southern Maryland became popular for its slot machines which operated legally there between 1949 (1943 in some places) and 1968. In 1977, New Jersey legalized gambling in Atlantic City. The city rapidly grew into a significant tourist destination, briefly revitalizing what had largely been a run-down slum community. In 1979, the Seminole tribe opened the first reservation-based commercial gambling, beginning a trend that would be followed by other reservations. Gradually, lotteries and some types of parimutuel betting were legalized in other areas of the country.

In the 1990s, riverboat casinos were legalized in Louisiana and Illinois in addition to other states. In 1996, Michigan legalized gambling in the city of Detroit, creating an economic center for potential casino growth.

In the early 21st century, Internet gambling grew rapidly in popularity worldwide. Global Internet gambling reaching US$34 billion in 2011. This is higher than worldwide movie box office revenues and represents 9% of the international gambling market. However, interstate and international transactions remained illegal under the Federal Wire Act of 1961, with additional penalties added by the Unlawful Internet Gambling Enforcement Act of 2006.

=== Legalization of sports gambling ===
In 1992, the US Congress passed the Professional and Amateur Sports Protection Act (PASPA). It mandated states not to legalize sports betting apart from parimutuel horse racing, dog racing and jai alai. The sports lotteries conducted in Oregon, Delaware, and Montana were exempt, as well as the licensed sports pools in Nevada. It also provided a one-year window for states which operated licensed casino gaming to legalize sports wagering, which New Jersey intended to do but did not by the end of the window.

A national survey in 2010 by Fairleigh Dickinson University's PublicMind found that 67% of Americans did not support the legalization of Internet betting websites in the United States, whereas 21% said they would support legalization. In a national poll released in December 2011, PublicMind asked voters whether they “support or oppose changing the federal law to allow sports betting” in their respective states. Just as many voters approved (42%) as opposed (42%) allowing sports betting. However, voters who lived in households where family members (including themselves) engaged in sports betting strongly favored legalization of sports betting (71% to 23%), while voters in households where sports betting was not an activity opposed legalization (46% to 36%). Peter J. Woolley, professor of political science and director of the poll, commented on the findings, “Gambling has become, for good or ill, a national industry, and you can bet that politicians and casinos all over the country are closely following New Jersey’s plans.”

In a different study released by FDU's PublicMind in October 2011, results showed that New Jersey voters thought legalizing sports betting in New Jersey was a good idea. Half of New Jersey voters (52%) said that they approved the idea of legalizing sports betting at Atlantic City casinos and racetracks, 31% opposed it. In addition, there was a significant gender split: a majority of men approved of the idea by a wide margin (65% to 21%), while only 39% of women approved and 41% opposed. The October results were stable, reflecting an earlier poll in April 2011 where New Jersey voters approved the legalization of sports betting in the state by a margin of 53% to 30%. However, nearly two-thirds (66%) of voters were not aware of the upcoming statewide referendum on the issue. Age proved to be a divide: voters between the ages 18 and 34 were more likely to approve of sports betting than were older voters. Dr. Woolley commented: "But... younger voters... are far less likely to vote than other voters... As always, a lot depends on who actually shows up to vote."

In February 2011, FDU's PublicMind released a poll which showed that over half (55%) of voters agreed "that people bet on sports games anyway, so government should allow it and tax it." On the other hand, approximately 37% of New Jersey voters concurred that betting on sports is "a bad idea because it promotes too much gambling and can corrupt sports." Again, by a significant margin (70% to 26%), voters who already engaged in sports betting in office pools tended to be more supportive of legal sports betting than those that didn't.

Donald Hoover, a professor at the International School of Hospitality and Tourism Management at FDU and a former casino executive, commented on the results, "Betting on sports is not an uncommon practice for many New Jerseyans, but for the most part, the state doesn't supervise it, doesn't tax it and doesn't take any revenue from it." In 2010, a national poll showed that voters opposed sports betting in all states by a margin of 53% to 39%. Woolley commented on the results, "If some states allow sports betting and profit by it, other states will want to follow." Yet by December 2011, after New Jersey passed its sports betting referendum, the national margin shifted to 42% to 42%. In January 2012, New Jersey Governor Chris Christie signed legislation allowing sports betting in the state, after it was approved in a nonbinding voter referendum in 2011. He announced on May 24, 2012 that he planned to go ahead and set up a system of wagering at the state's racetracks and casinos that fall, before the NFL season ended.

In 2012, despite then-existing federal law prohibitions, the state legislature and Governor Chris Christie signed a law that would allow sports betting to take place at race tracks throughout the state and at Atlantic City casinos. In August 2012, Fairleigh Dickinson University's PublicMind conducted a study on the issue. Voters were asked whether New Jersey should allow sports betting even if federal law prevents it from doing so, or wait to allow sports betting until federal law permits it. Results showed that nearly half (45%) of voters wanted to allow sports betting, while (38%) decided to wait and allow sports betting once Congress allows it. Krista Jenkins, director of the poll, commented, "Although support is not overwhelming, these numbers suggest the public is cautiously behind the goal of moving forward with legalized sports betting."

In November 2014, a poll found that there had been a major shift in attitudes towards sports betting in the United States, showing that 55% of Americans now favored legal sports betting, while 66% of respondents agreed that this should be regulated by state laws, as opposed to federal legislation. The poll also suggested that 33% of respondents disagreed with the notion of legalization.

In June 2017, the Supreme Court of the United States announced that it would hear New Jersey's case, Murphy v. National Collegiate Athletic Association, in the fall of 2017, contradicting the position of the US Acting Solicitor General, Jeffrey Wall, who asked that the case not be heard in May 2017. In September 2017, a poll conducted by the Washington Post and the University of Massachusetts Lowell showed a 55% majority of adults in the US approved of legalizing betting on pro sporting events.

In 2018, PASPA was overturned by the Supreme Court of the United States in Murphy v. National Collegiate Athletic Association, ruling that it conflicted with the Tenth Amendment. New Jersey, Delaware, and additional states quickly drafting bills to legalize sports betting soon after. Some states had to determine which department would oversee state-regulated sportsbooks, usually choosing between their respective gambling commissions or lottery boards.

On June 5, 2018, Delaware became the second state after Nevada to implement full-scale sports betting. Sports betting in the state is run by the Delaware Lottery and is available at the state's three casinos. Prior to 2018, the state offered limited sports betting consisting of parlay betting and championship futures for the NFL. Delaware had been granted a partial exemption from the sports betting ban as it had made a failed attempt at legalized sports betting in 1976.

On June 11, 2018, New Jersey became the third state to legalize sports betting. Sports betting in New Jersey began when a sportsbook opened at Monmouth Park Racetrack on June 14, 2018. Following this, sportsbooks opened at the casinos in Atlantic City and at Meadowlands Racetrack.

Mississippi became the fourth state in the United States to launch sports betting operations on August 1, 2018, when Gold Strike Casino Resort in Tunica Resorts and Beau Rivage in Biloxi started taking wagers. On August 30, West Virginia became the fifth state to launch sports betting, with Hollywood Casino at Charles Town Races the first casino to offer sports betting. New Mexico became the sixth state to offer sports betting on October 16, 2018, with the launch of sports betting at the Santa Ana Star Casino in Bernalillo.

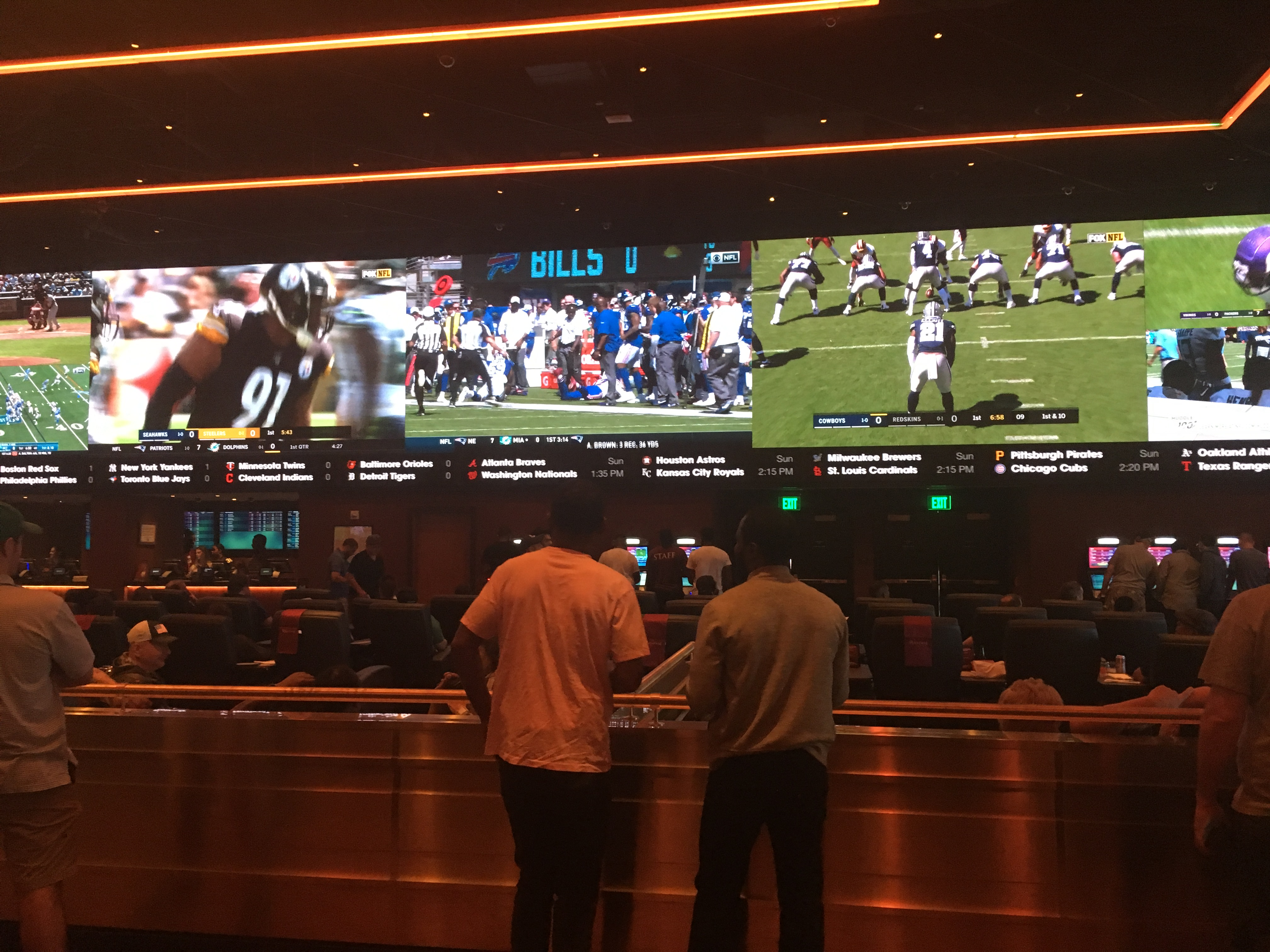
Sportsbook at Parx Casino in Bensalem Township, Pennsylvania

Pennsylvania approved a sports betting law in October 2017, prior to PASPA being struck down. Pennsylvania became the seventh state to legalize sports betting when the state had regulations for sports betting in place in August 2018. The state approved the first sports betting licenses for Hollywood Casino at Penn National Race Course and Parx Casino on October 3, 2018. On November 17, 2018, after a two-day soft launch, Hollywood Casino became the first casino in Pennsylvania to offer sports betting. Several other casinos would follow in launching sports betting. Online sports betting in Pennsylvania began on May 28, 2019, when SugarHouse Casino launched an online sports betting app. Other casinos have followed in offering online sports betting. On November 21, 2018, Rhode Island became the eighth state to legalize sports betting, with Twin River Casino in Lincoln opening the first sportsbook in the state.

Wisconsin moved a step closer to having sports betting in Milwaukee in March 2022 when Wisconsin signed a tribal compact with the Forest County Potawatomi Community. California voters were asked to decide if online sports betting would be allowed in their state with Proposition 27, on the November 2022 ballot; a majority of the revenue from online gaming operations was intended to fund relief programs for the homeless, with a smaller portion going to California's indigenous tribal communities. However, the ballot measure was defeated, with 17% of voters voting in favor. Sports betting therefore remains illegal in the state.

Florida has seen a back and forth with sports betting starting in 2021. On May 25, 2021, Governor Ron DeSantis signed an updated gambling compact that permitted the Seminole Tribe of Florida to offer sports betting. Though the Seminole Hard Rock Sportsbook accepted bets as early as November 1, 2021, Judge Dabney L. Friedrich threw out the compact weeks later as lawsuits came forth. Briefs and answer briefs were filed throughout 2022 as Florida holds no regulated sportsbooks inside their border in 2023.

For the 2023 legislative session, Texas took gambling legislation to a new level. Before the session began, legislators filed five gambling bills. Some look to legalize sports betting as well as casino gambling while others look for harsher punishments for breaking Texas gambling laws.

In March 2023, Kentucky Gov. Andy Beshear signed House Bill 551 into law, legalizing sports betting in the state. The measure passed in the General Assembly with a 25-12 vote in the Senate and a 63-34 vote in the House of Representatives. The state's regulator will be the Kentucky Horse Racing Commission. The tax revenue from sports betting in the state will be used to help combat gambling addiction, cover regulatory costs, and fund the state's public pension system.

== See also ==
- Gambling
- Gambling in the United States
- History of gambling in the United Kingdom
- Casino
- Lotteries in the United States
- Numbers game
- Online gambling
- Gambler's fallacy
