= Choctaw Country =

Tourism designation for Southeast Oklahoma, US

Coordinates: 34.5°N 95.0°W

One definition of Southeastern Oklahoma, but not the Choctaw Country designation by the Oklahoma Department of Tourism and Recreation

The flag of the Choctaw Nation

Choctaw Country is the Oklahoma Department of Tourism and Recreation's official tourism designation for Southeast Oklahoma. The name was previously Kiamichi Country until changed in honor of the Choctaw Nation headquartered there. The current definition of Choctaw Country includes ten counties, being Coal, Atoka, Bryan, Choctaw, McCurtain, Pushmataha, Le Flore, Latimer, Haskell, and Pittsburg counties. The department created the term as one of six designated travel regions within the state. However, other definitions of Southeastern Oklahoma may include additional counties.

Due to an influx of southerners seeking less expensive frontier lands during the post-Civil War Reconstruction era, Choctaw Country developed a culture that is more southern than the rest of the state. This region has also been called "Little Dixie".

Lightly populated, heavily mountainous and forested, the region is popular for outdoor recreation. It supports water sports, mountain biking, hiking, hunting, horse back riding, fishing, and national scenic drives. The area of jurisdiction of the Choctaw Nation covers much of this territory.

== History ==
After this area was acquired by the United States from France through the Louisiana Purchase of 1803, it was organized as part of the new Arkansas Territory. On April 1, 1820, Arkansas created Miller County, which included most of the land that would be classified as Little Dixie. A post office at Miller Courthouse was established on September 7, 1824.

In the meantime, the United States was organizing to remove the Five Civilized Tribes from the Southeast, in order to make their lands available for development by European Americans. There was great pressure on these tribes as settlers encroached on their lands and competed for resources.

Some Choctaw had started moving into the region from Mississippi since the Treaty of Doak's Stand in 1820. Per a treaty signed by the United States on January 20, 1825, with the Choctaw, the land west of a line "one hundred paces east of Fort Smith, and running thence, due south, to Red river" was ceded to the Choctaw. The residents west of the line made a futile attempt to be exempted from the treaty but failed. They burned the courthouse and most of the records before they left.

Following passage of the Indian Removal Act of 1830, and ratification of the Treaty of Dancing Rabbit Creek with Choctaw leaders in 1830, by which they ceded most of their land in the Southeast, the federal government began forced removal of the Choctaw. By 1834, nearly 8,000 Choctaw had arrived in their new land over the "trail of tears and death". At Nanih Waiya, near the present Tuskahoma Council House, they established a capital and adopted the first constitution ever written in what is now Oklahoma.

The Choctaw actively supported the Confederacy during the American Civil War, and retained their reservation land in eastern Indian Territory under the new treaty required after the war by the United States. In 1898, after intense pressure from Washington and with no clear alternative, they agreed to an allotment plan administered by the Dawes Commission. Their lands and those of the allied Chickasaw were thereby opened to settlement by non-Indians.

By the Oklahoma Enabling Act of 1906, the United States erected a state government over Choctaw Nation. During the 1900s, state court judges approved and ordered the transfer of tribal allotments in proceedings with under evidentiary rules that enabled systematic probate fraud. A common tactic of settlers was to take newly orphaned Choctaw girls, marry them, and have them intervene in the state court’s administration of the land allotment inherited by the orphan. In at least some cases, demonstrably fake identities were named as the plaintiff and wife of the settler to achieve the transfer of tribal land to settlers.

Court orders disposing of property in this way frequently describe highly dubious land transactions, such as settlers obtaining court ordered transfers of the land of Choctaw women who died with no living heirs, and proving ownership by claiming a cash transaction occurred just prior to her death, the receipt to which signed only with her X, and accepted as valid by the court. In normal circumstances, a judge presented with such a claim would not accept the story as true without substantial evidence that the receipt for the land sale was authentic, or that the deceased woman spent or died in possession of the money she allegedly received for the land. And because these proceedings were uncontested—-that is, conducted without any tribal members present—-no one objected and drew attention to whether settlers might have been the cause of the death in the first place, in which case the Slayer Rule would invalidate any claim to the estate.

By shutting tribal interests out of the legal process for legitimating and recording land ownership, significant land reserved for Choctaw Nation was transferred to settlers and US corporations in violation of the terms of the Treaty of Dancing Rabbit Creek. To wit, the majority opinion authored by Justice Neil Gorsuch in McGirt v. Oklahoma devotes substantial attention to the role of state courts during this period in violating this binding and living treaty. This chapter was a deep loss and is continuing pain for the Choctaw.

The damage of the Civil War and a long decline in cotton prices meant years of a poor economy in the mostly rural South. Many persons migrated from the South to seek opportunities in new western lands. When the Indian lands were opened, Southerners flocked to the Indian Nations for a new start, especially to the old Choctaw reserve. So many homesteaded in the area that they markedly influenced the politics and culture of the region. They made much of what is now southeastern Oklahoma culturally a southern state.

== Geography ==
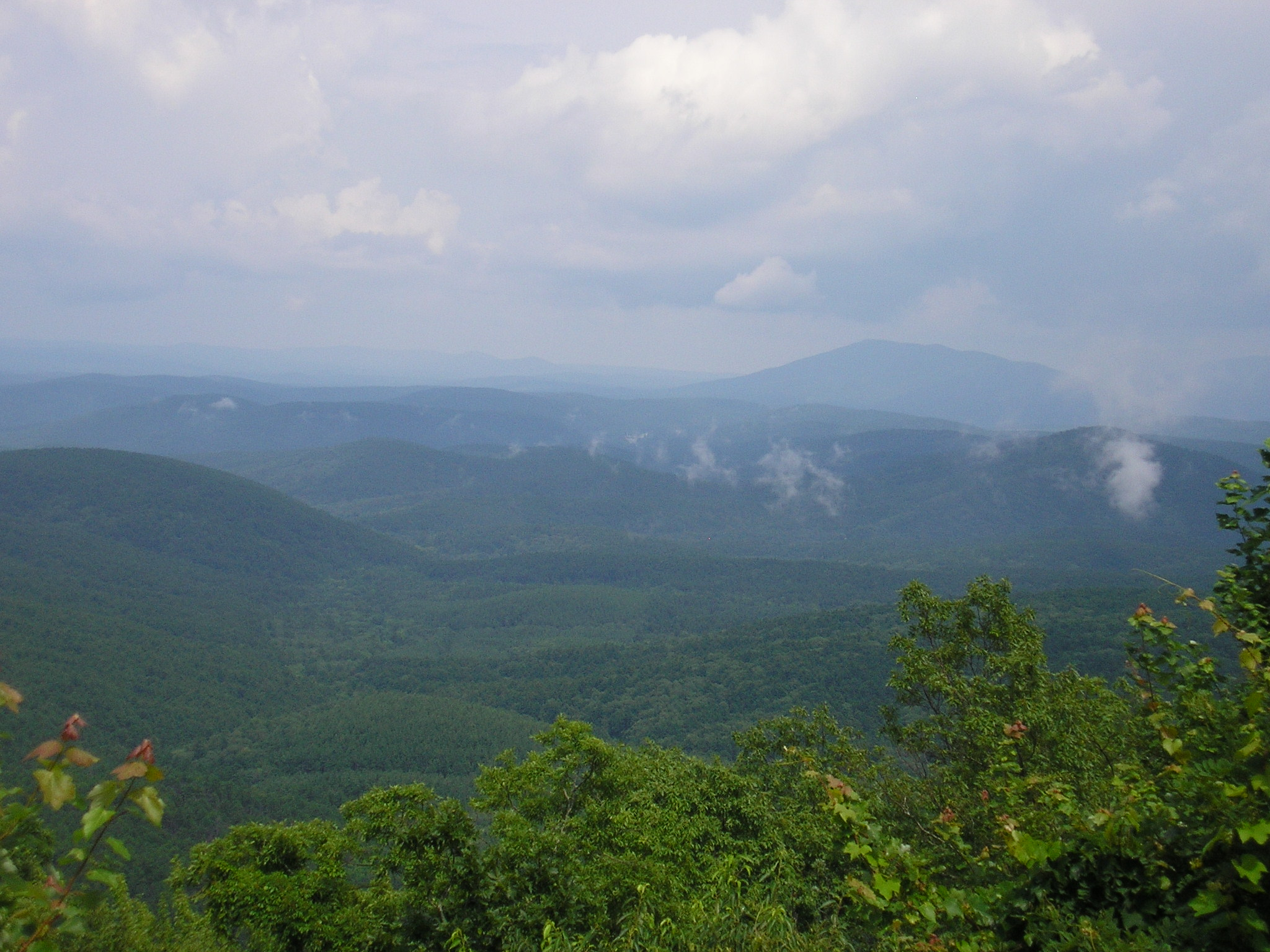
Ouachita Mountains in Southeast Oklahoma

Southeast Oklahoma is far more mountainous and forested than any other part of the state, containing most of the Ouachita Mountains in Oklahoma, the Arbuckle Mountains, and five other mountain ranges. The Ouachita National Forest, Oklahoma's only national forest, is also in this area.

Choctaw Country also houses "The World's Highest Hill," a 1,999-foot peak near Poteau, as the official designation for a "mountain" is land that is 2,000-feet or taller.

The region contains Oklahoma's largest lake by surface area, Lake Eufaula. Other major lakes include Robert S. Kerr Reservoir, Sardis Lake, Hugo Lake, McGee Creek Reservoir, Pine Creek Lake, Broken Bow Lake, Lake Wister, Lake Atoka Reservoir, and on Choctaw Country's southwestern border, Lake Texoma.

== Politics ==
The region's voters are overwhelmingly Democratic—around 80%. Many of the citizens refer to themselves as yellow-dog Democrats. But an increasing number of conservative white and American Indian voters have joined the Republican trend in Oklahoma. Others register as Democrats to vote in primaries but vote for Republican candidates in general elections.

From statehood until 2003, most of the region was in its own Congressional district, the 3rd District (numbered the 4th District from 1907 until 1915). Its best-known congressman was Carl Albert, from McAlester, who represented the district for 30 years, the last six as Speaker of the House. Albert became synonymous with the region. At 5 feet 4 inches (1.63 m) tall, he was known affectionately as the Little Giant from Little Dixie.

Albert retired in 1977 and was succeeded by Wes Watkins, who held the seat for 14 years. He decided to run for governor in 1990. However, the Democratic campaign tactics during the primary forced Watkins from the race (and eventually from the Democratic Party). Watkins later shifted his party affiliation and registered as a Republican. In 1996, he easily won back his seat on the strength of his personal connection with the region's voters. He was the first Republican to win this seat since statehood. Watkins's victory seemed a catalyst for several other local Republican victories in the region.

After the 2000 U.S. census, Oklahoma lost one seat in Congress. Most of the Little Dixie region was combined with northeastern Oklahoma to become Oklahoma's 2nd congressional district. The region remains strongly Democratic politically, but most of the Democrats in this region are fairly conservative culturally by national standards. A majority of Native Americans generally support the Republican Party on social issues, gun rights, limited government and national security. From 2005 to 2013, Dan Boren, son of former Oklahoma governor and United States Senator David Boren, represented the district in the House. According to the Chicago Tribune, Boren of Oklahoma was the Democrat in the House who backed President George W. Bush most often, with 77.9 percent of his votes, a higher score than set by 26 House Republicans. Josh Brecheen, a Republican from Coalgate, currently holds the 2nd congressional district seat; he is the third Republican elected for this seat since 1921.

Republican presidential nominee Donald Trump swept the region in the 2020 election, and he also carried the critical Native American vote in Choctaw Country and the state-at-large (most likely due to his conservative and limited-government appeal to both white and Native American voters in the region). According to Associated Press exit polls, Trump also won the Native American vote nationally over Joe Biden by a narrow 7 point margin.

== Tourism ==
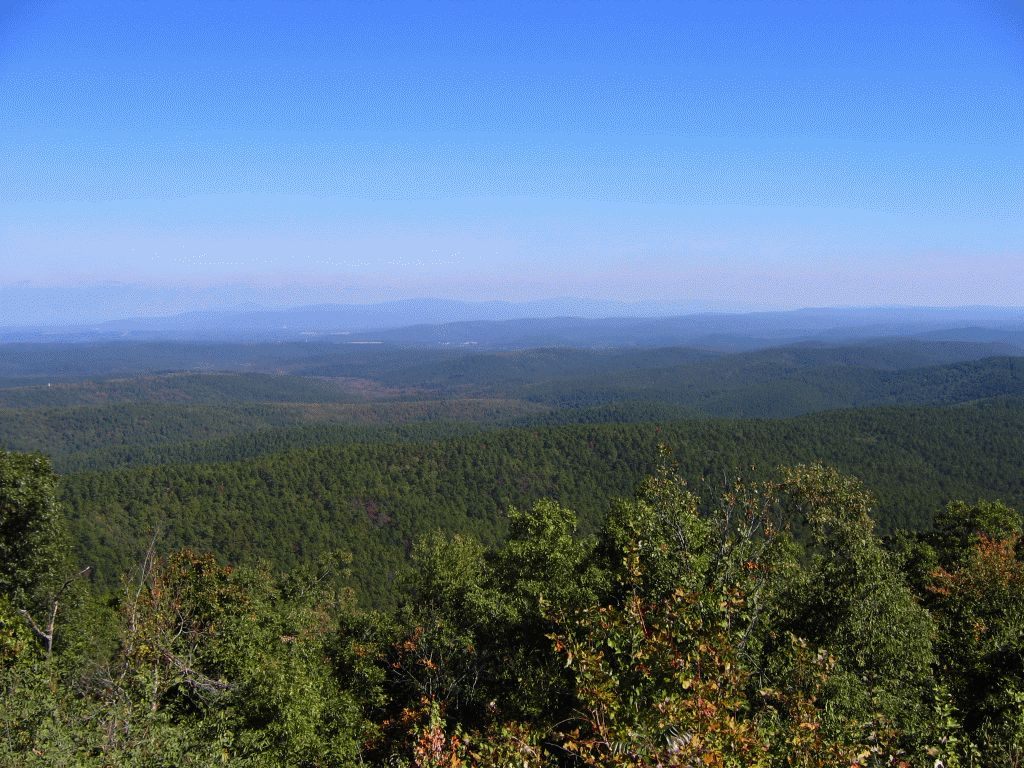
A view from Talimena Drive.

Choctaw Country bills itself as the "Deer Capital of the World." Main tourism draws include award-winning scenic drives through the Ouachita Mountains, 13 major lakes, the nearby Chickasaw National Recreation Area, state parks, and whitewater rapids sports. The Talimena Scenic Drive is also an attraction, as travelers pass through the Ouachita National Forest in the Winding Stair Mountains.

== Demographics ==
Per the 2000 census, the region had 305,395 people. Whites equal about 76% of the total, American Indians total a little over 17%, and Blacks, nearly 4%. Many of the African Americans area descendants of Choctaw freedmen (enslaved persons emancipated after the Civil War; a number have mixed Choctaw and African-American ancestry). The median per capita income in the region is $13,948, almost $10,000 less than the state average of $23,517.

== Cities and towns ==
The city of McAlester serves as the region's primary urban center. A major urban center to the south is Durant, which is ranked as one of the fastest-growing cities in the United States.

Other important cities and towns include Atoka, Poteau, Hugo, Idabel, Broken Bow, Talihina, Clayton, Antlers, Coalgate, Stigler, and Wilburton.
