= Southwestern Oklahoma =

Geographic region of Oklahoma, United States

Coordinates: 34.5°N 98.5°W

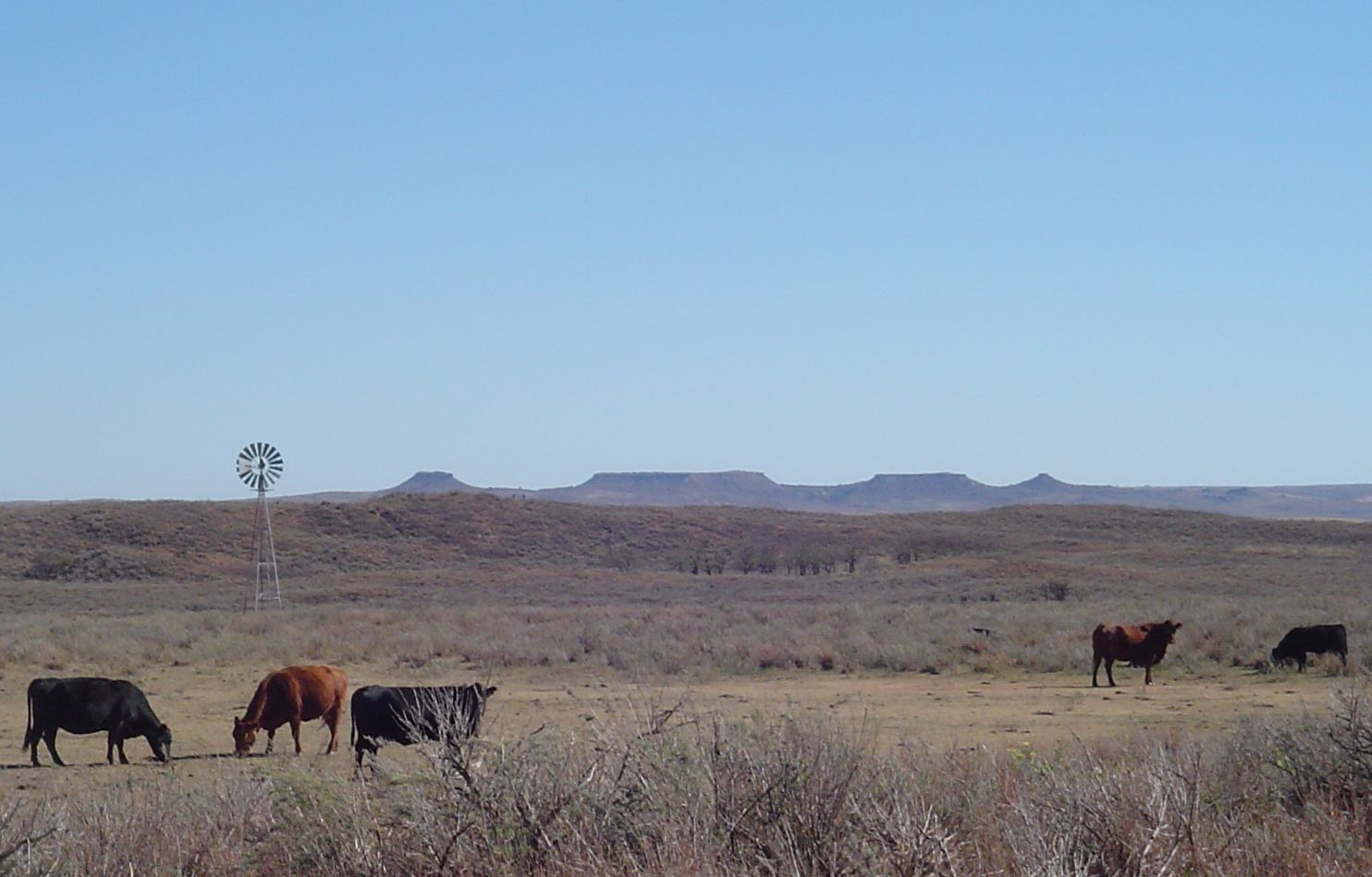
The Antelope Hills of Southwest Oklahoma in the distance

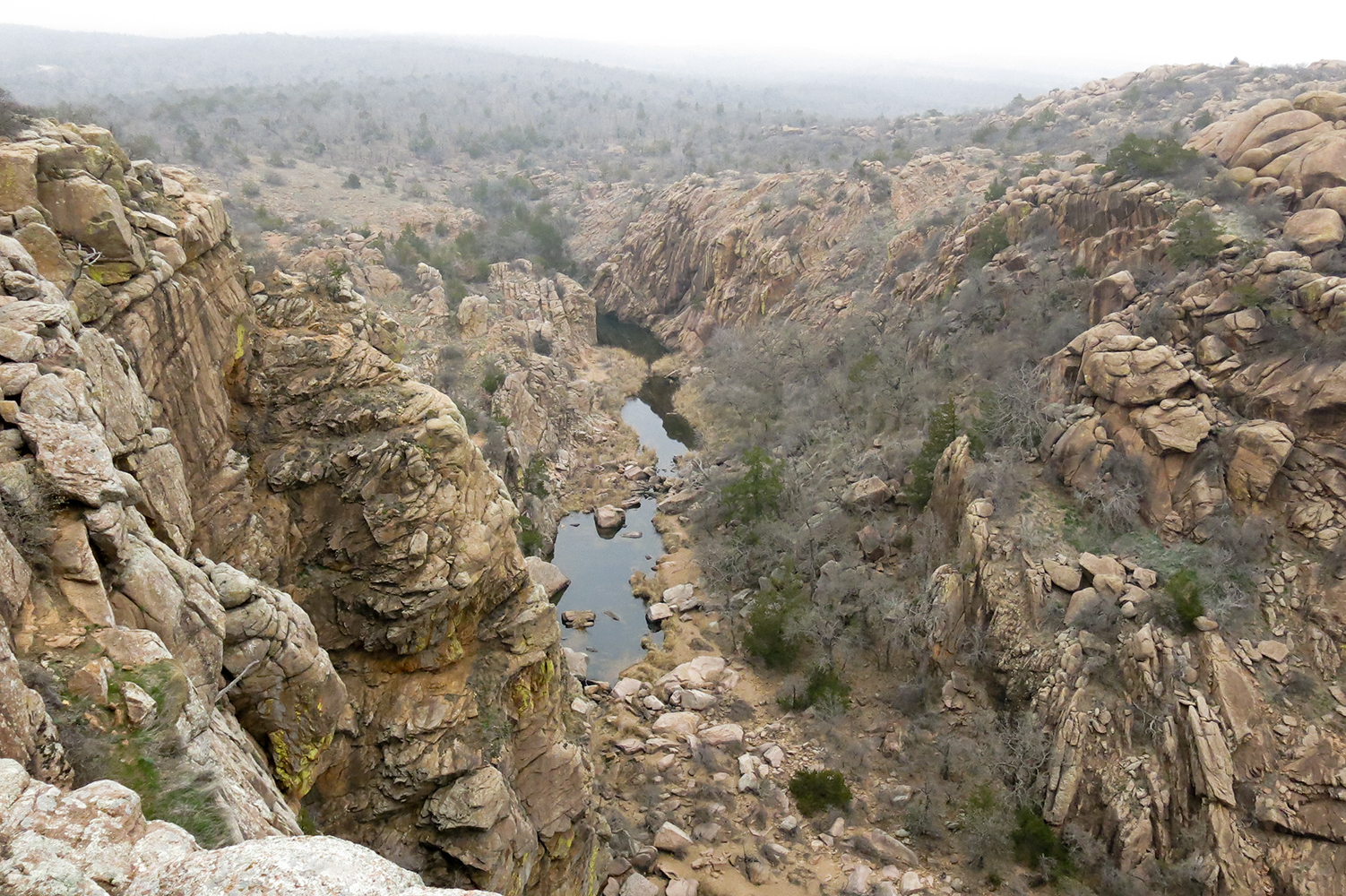
Wichita Mountains Narrows

Southwest Oklahoma is a geographical name for the southwest portion of the state of Oklahoma, typically considered to be south of the Canadian River, extending eastward from the Texas border to a line roughly from Weatherford, to Anadarko, to Duncan. Geologically, the region is defined by a failed continental rift known as the Southern Oklahoma Aulacogen. The austere nature of the prairie landscape with intermittent island ranges has made it a favorable place for artists and photographers alike. For tourism purposes, the Oklahoma Tourism and Recreation Department has designated Southwestern Oklahoma as Great Plains Country, and defined it to consist of 14 counties including Roger Mills, Custer, Beckham, Washita, Caddo, Kiowa, Greer, Harmon, Jackson, Comanche, Tillman, Cotton, Stephens, and Jefferson counties.

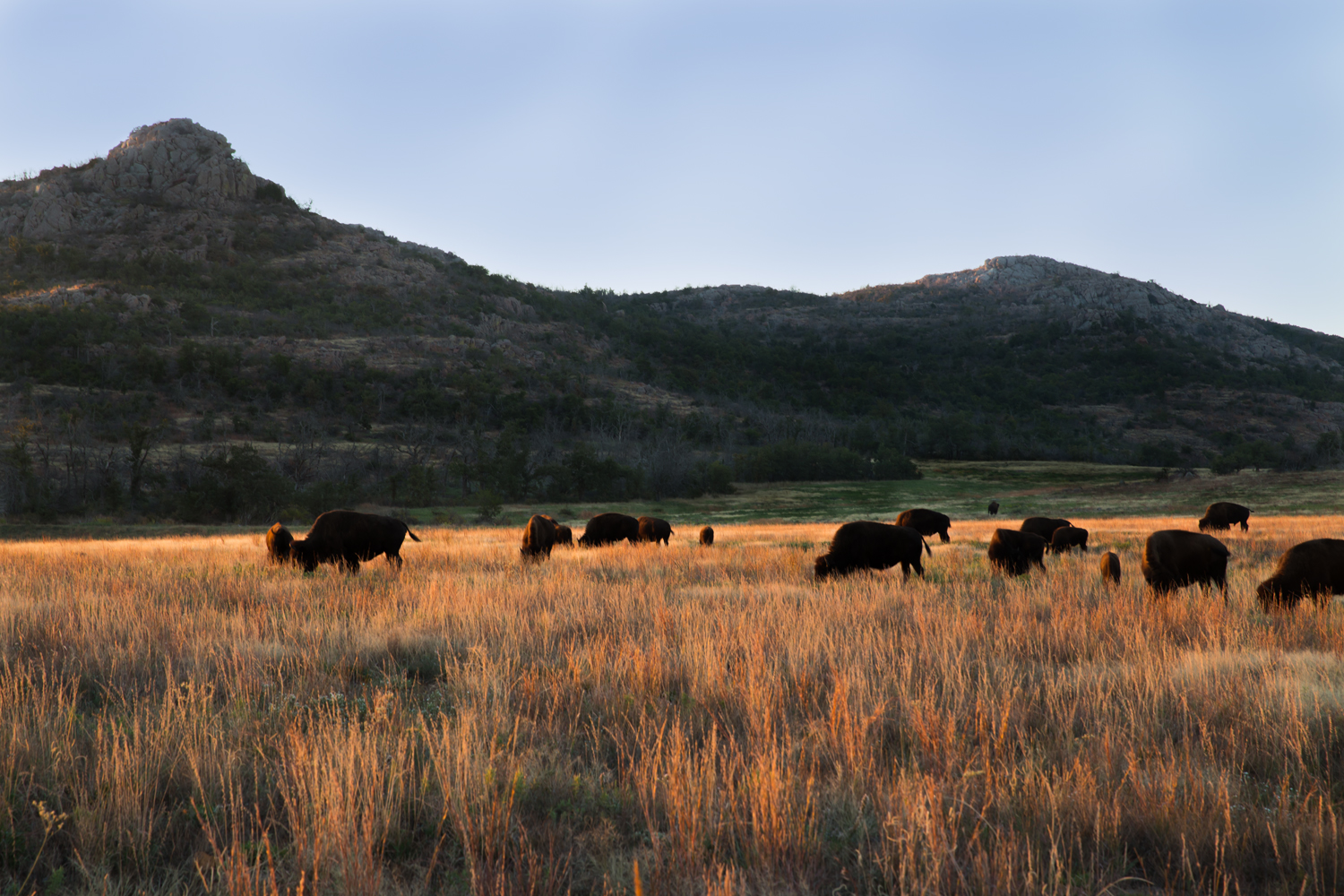
American bison

Anchored by Lawton, its largest city, Southwest Oklahoma's other important urban centers include Elk City, Clinton, Weatherford, Walters, Altus, and Duncan.

== History ==
One section of the 1890 Organic Act established that a lawsuit should be filed to clarify the boundary between Oklahoma and Texas. The U.S. Supreme Court ruled in 1896 that what had been considered part of Texas would now be part of Oklahoma Territory. The area makes up the southwestern corner of Oklahoma and today consists of Beckham County, Harmon County, Jackson County, and Greer County.

Another portion of Southwestern Oklahoma was opened up through the Land Run of 1892. Land formerly owned by the Cheyenne and Arapaho tribes became Oklahoma Territory and today includes Blaine County, Dewey County, Custer County, and Roger Mills County and Washita County.

== Geography ==
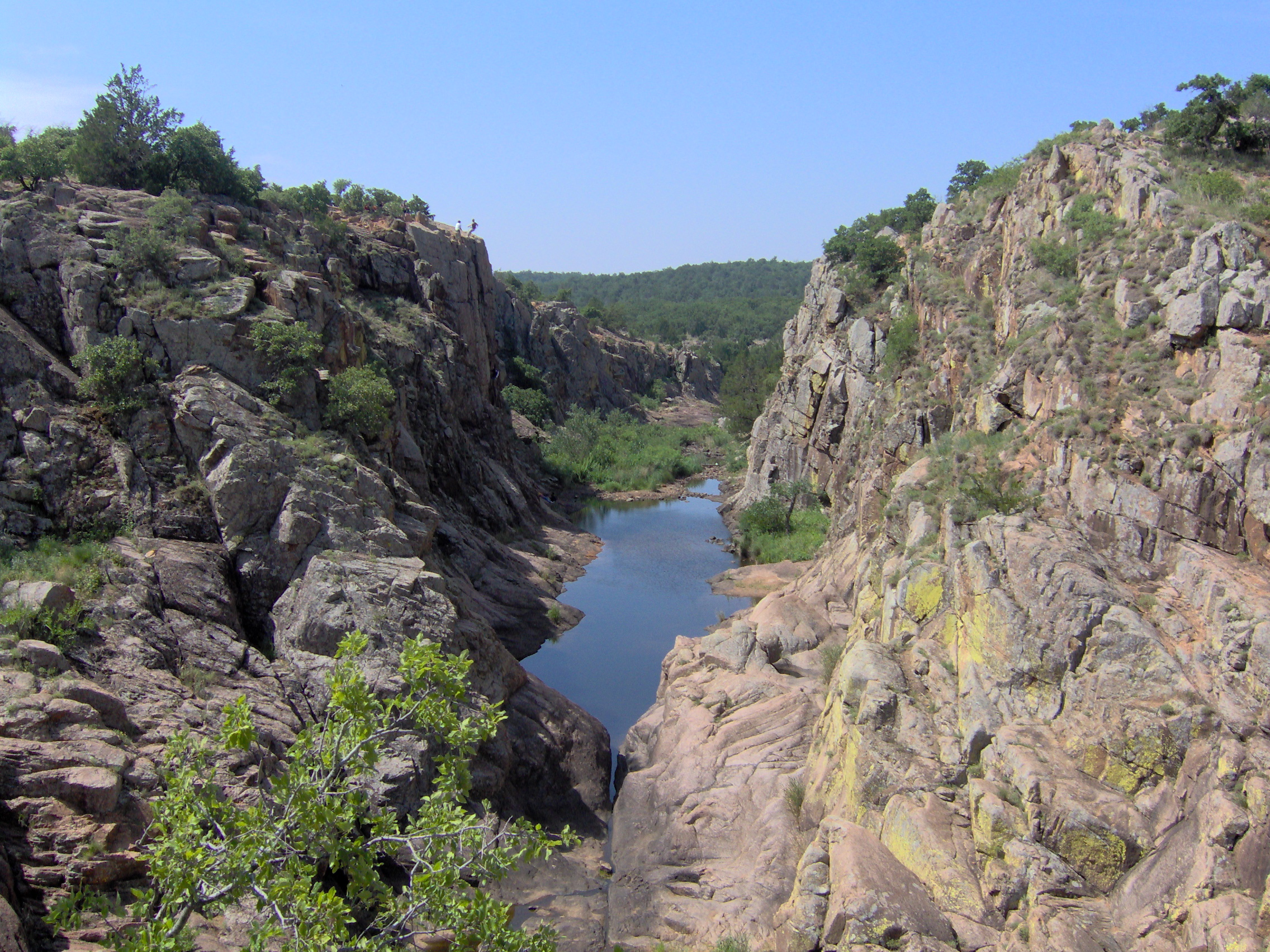
A canyon in the Wichita Mountains near Lawton.

Consisting of grassland and gently rolling hills, Southwest Oklahoma is atypical to the rest of the Great Plains region of the United States, as it is less dry than adjacent West Texas and contains many geographic features which further differentiates the unique climate. The area has a humid subtropical climate, receiving anywhere from about 20 inches of precipitation annually in the far west, to 35 inches annually in the eastern section. Monsoon-like rains are common in the spring months, while periods of drought can occur throughout other parts of the year.

The region has several small, sky island mountain ranges, the largest of which being the Wichita Mountains, considered by geologists to be one of the oldest mountain ranges in the world.

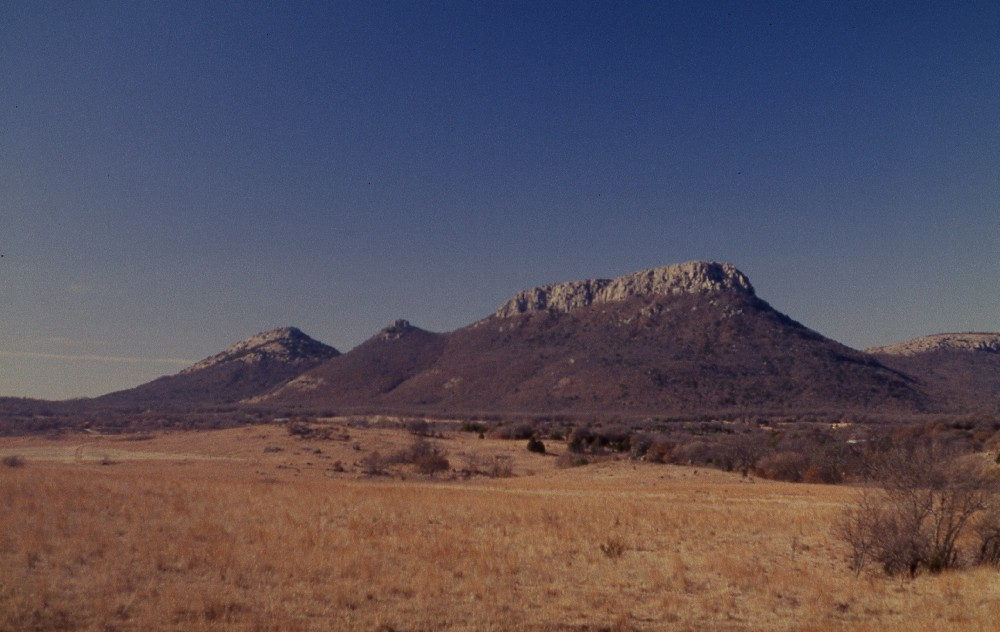
Mount Sheridan

The region is known for its many rare, relic plant species, acting as the northern and western boundaries for many iconic plant species such as the escarpment live oak, nolina, bigtooth maple, and sugar maple.

Significant geographic landmarks include the Black Kettle National Grassland, the Taovayan Valley, the Wichita Mountains, the Antelope Hills, and the Quartz Mountains.

=== Climate ===
Southwestern Oklahoma has a humid subtropical climate with frequent variations in weather.

The average mean temperature for Southwestern Oklahoma is 61.9 °F (16.6 °C). The summers have an average 21 days with temperatures 100 °F (37.8 °C) and above. The area averages eight days that fail to rise above freezing. The region receives about 31.6 inches (800 mm) of precipitation.

Typically in late April through early June, Southwestern Oklahoma is prone to severe weather which can include tornadoes. Notably in 1957, an F4 tornado and again in 1979 an F3 tornado struck the southern region of Lawton.

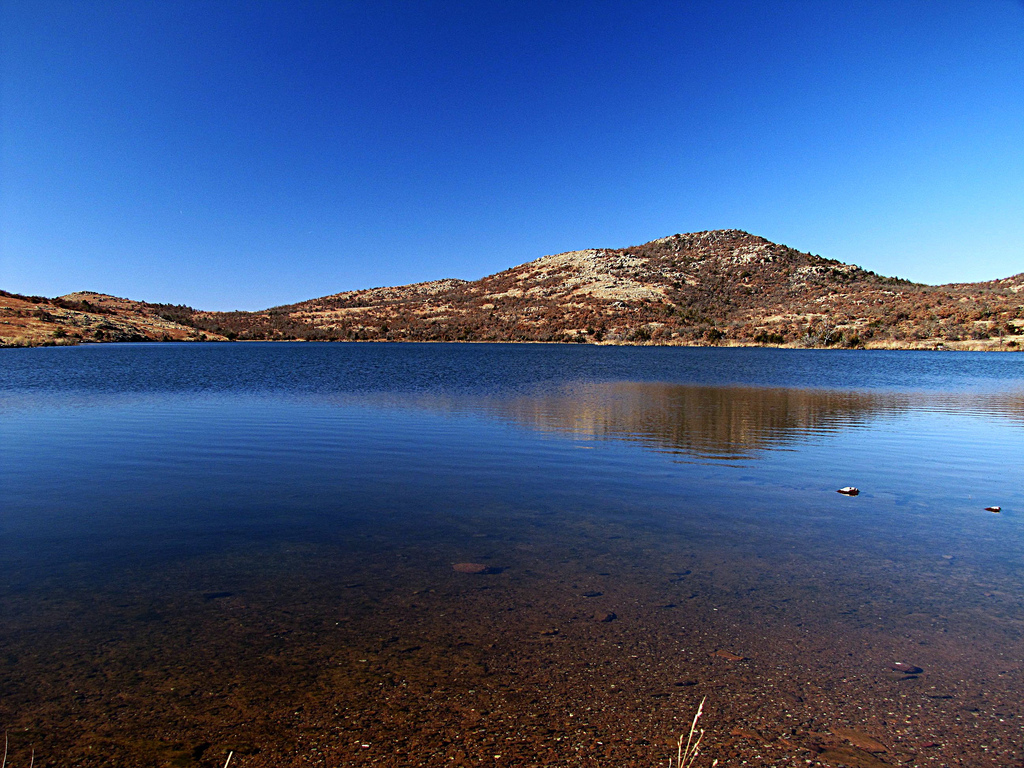

== Economy ==
Southwestern Oklahoma's economy is anchored in the United States Armed Forces and agriculture, manufacturing, and energy industries. Two military bases, Fort Sill in Lawton and Altus Air Force Base east-northeast of Altus, Oklahoma, are large employers in the region. Cattle is a major agricultural product of the region. Wind farms and oil and gas companies are other major employers in the region.

== Education ==
Southwestern Oklahoma is home to both public and private primary and secondary schools, though there are fewer private schools than in other parts of the state, such as Oklahoma City and Tulsa.

The Oklahoma public school system is known for its pre-kindergarten education. The National Institute for Early Education Research rated it first in the United States with regard to standards, quality, and access to pre-kindergarten education in 2004, calling it a model for early childhood education. In 2004, the state ranked 36th in the nation for the relative number of adults with high school diplomas, though at 85.2 percent, it had the highest rate among southern states.

Private schools in the Southwestern Oklahoma include Western Oklahoma Christian School in Clinton and Corn Bible Academy in Corn.

Cameron University is the largest four-year, public university in Southwestern Oklahoma. The university has an average fall enrollment of 6,000 students with 70 endowed faculty positions.

The region is also home to Southwestern Oklahoma State University, a public university with locations in Weatherford and Sayre. It was placed at Tier 1 in the category "Regional Universities (West)" in the 2011 U.S. News & World Report. SWOSU has 15 nationally accredited academic programs—the most among Oklahoma's senior regional universities.fore i

The Comanche Nation College in Lawton provided lower division programs, before its closure on July 31, 2017.

The region is also served by the Great Plains Technology Center and Western Technology Center, both of which are part of the Oklahoma Department of Career and Technology Education System.
