= List of census-designated places in Oklahoma =

Images of the Tiawah CDP
and of the actual community

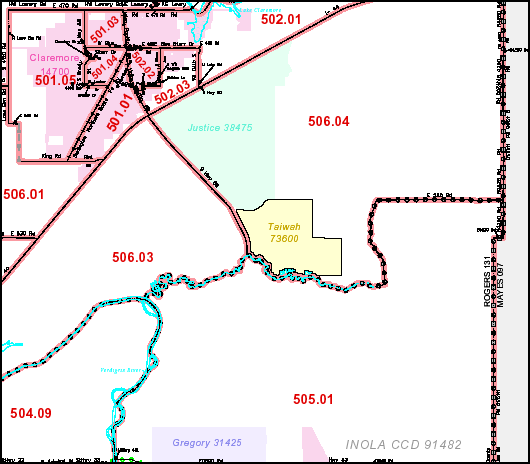
The Tiawah CDP (in yellow) lies east of Oklahoma State Highway 88.

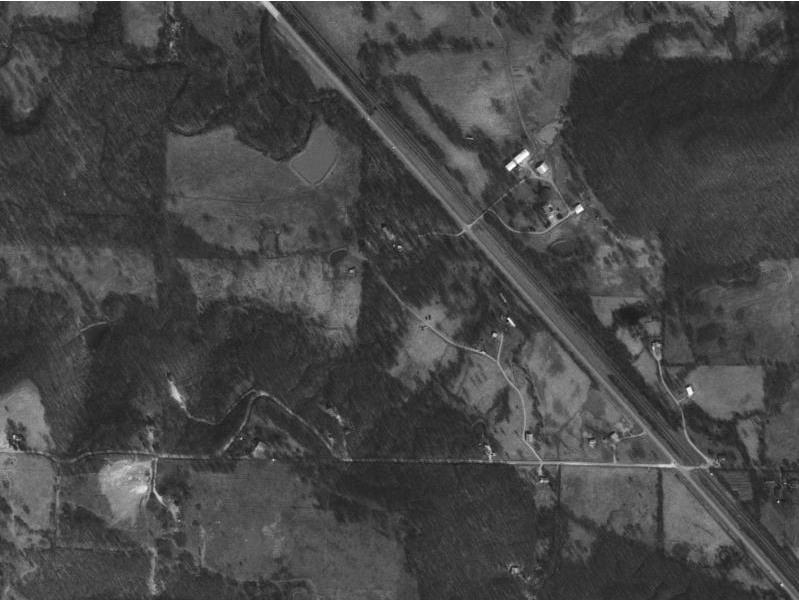
The actual Tiawah community lies on either side of Highway 88 in the midst of the Tiawah Hills.

The list of census-designated places in Oklahoma contains those areas defined by the US Census Bureau as CDPs. A CDP is a "statistical entity ... comprising a densely settled concentration of population that is not within an incorporated place". CDPs have no governmental powers or cartographic meaning, although they do have boundaries as defined by the Census Bureau. All CDPs, nationwide, were created in 1980 or later; while they serve the census bureau for research purposes, they do not replace the pre-existent organized communities (towns, etc.) which they encompass. For an unknown reason the majority of CDPs in Oklahoma are in the northeastern quarter of the state.

Many of the CDPs were named for communities located within the defined entities, or for nearby communities. Where known, the associated communities are also listed for reference. The sources for the associated communities are primarily from Shirk's Oklahoma Place Names (ISBN 0-8061-2028-2), the United States Geological Survey, or the list of unincorporated communities in Oklahoma.

== A ==
- Adams – Texas County
- Adamson – Pittsburg County
- Akins – Sequoyah County
- Albany – Bryan County
- Arpelar – Pittsburg County
- Avard – Woods County

== B ==
- Bache – Pittsburg County
- Badger Lee – Sequoyah County
- Baker – Texas County
- Ballou – Mayes County
- Barber – Cherokee County
- Baron – Adair County
- Bee – Johnston County
- Belfonte – Sequoyah County
- Bell – Adair County
- Bentley – Atoka County
- Bison – Garfield County
- Blackgum – Sequoyah County
- Blanco – Pittsburg County
- Blue – Bryan County
- Bowring – Osage County
- Box – Sequoyah County
- Brent – Sequoyah County
- Briartown – Muskogee County
- Briggs – Cherokee County
- Brush Creek – Delaware County
- Brushy – Sequoyah County
- Bryant – Okmulgee County
- Bug Tussle – Pittsburg County
- Bull Hollow – Delaware County
- Bunch – Adair County
- Burneyville – Love County
- Bushyhead – Rogers County
- Butler – Delaware County

== C ==
- Canadian Shores – Pittsburg County
- Caney – Cherokee County
- Caney Ridge – Cherokee County
- Carlisle – Sequoyah County
- Cartwright – Bryan County
- Cave Spring – Adair County
- Cayuga – Delaware County
- Cedar Crest – Mayes County
- Cedar Lake – Canadian County
- Chance – Adair County
- Cherry Tree – Adair County
- Chester – Major County
- Chewey – Adair County
- Christie – Adair County
- Clarita – Coal County
- Clarksville – Wagoner County
- Cleora – Delaware County
- Cloud Creek – Delaware County
- Coleman – Johnston County
- Connerville – Johnston County
- Cookson – Cherokee County
- Copeland – Delaware County
- Cottonwood – Coal County
- Crescent Springs – Logan County
- Cumberland – Marshall County

== D ==
- Dale – Pottawatomie County
- Deer Lick – Delaware County
- Dennis – Delaware County
- Dixon – Seminole County
- Dodge – Delaware County
- Dotyville – Ottawa County
- Dripping Springs – Delaware County
- Drowning Creek – Delaware County
- Dry Creek – Cherokee County
- Duchess Landing – McIntosh County
- Durham – Roger Mills County
- Dwight Mission – Sequoyah County

== E ==
- Eagle City – Blaine County
- Eagletown – McCurtain County
- Earl – Johnston County
- Edgewater Park – Comanche County
- Eldon – Cherokee County
- Elm Grove – Adair County
- Elohim City – Adair County
- Emet – Johnston County
- Enterprise – Haskell County
- Etta – Cherokee County
- Evening Shade – Sequoyah County

== F ==
- Fairfield – Adair County
- Fay – Dewey County
- Felt – Cimarron County
- Finley – Pushmataha County
- Fittstown – Pontotoc County
- Flint Creek – Delaware County
- Flute Springs – Sequoyah County
- Fox – Carter County

== G ==
- Gideon – Cherokee County
- Golden – McCurtain County
- Gowen – Latimer County
- Grandview – Cherokee County
- Grant – Choctaw County
- Greasy – Adair County
- Greenville – Love County
- Gregory – Rogers County

== H ==
- Hanson – Sequoyah County
- Haywood – Pittsburg County
- Hennepin – Garvin County
- Hodgen – LeFlore County
- Homestead – Blaine County
- Honey Hill – Adair County
- Hopeton – Woods County
- Hough – Texas County
- Hoyt – Haskell County

== I ==
- Indianola – Delaware County
- Ingalls – Payne County
- Iron Post – Mayes County
- Isabella – Major County

== J ==
- Johnson Prairie – Cherokee County
- Justice – Rogers County

== K ==
- Keefton – Muskogee County
- Kenton – Cimarron County
- Kenwood – Delaware and Mayes counties
- Keys – Cherokee County

== L ==
- Lake Ellsworth Addition – Comanche County
- Lakeside Village – Comanche County
- Lane – Atoka County
- Latta – Pontotoc County
- Lawtonka Acres – Comanche County
- Leach – Delaware County
- Lebanon – Marshall County
- Leonard – Tulsa County
- Lequire – Haskell County
- Liberty – Sequoyah County
- Limestone – Rogers County
- Little City – Marshall County
- Little Ponderosa – Beaver County
- Little Rock – Mayes County
- Long – Sequoyah County
- Longtown – Pittsburg County
- Lost City – Cherokee County
- Lovell – Logan County
- Lowrey – Cherokee County
- Lucien – Noble County
- Lyons Switch – Adair County

== M ==
- Mallard Bay – Wagoner County
- Marietta – Adair County
- Mazie – Mayes County
- McBride – Marshall County
- McCord – Osage County
- Mehan – Payne County
- Middleberg – Grady County
- Milfay – Creek County
- Monroe – LeFlore County
- Moodys – Cherokee County
- Moyers – Pushmataha County
- Mulberry – Adair County
- Murphy – Mayes County

== N ==
- Narcissa – Ottawa County
- Nardin – Kay County
- Nashoba – Pushmataha County
- Nelagoney – Osage County
- Nescatunga – Alfalfa County
- New Eucha – Delaware County
- Nicut – Sequoyah County
- Norwood – Cherokee and Muskogee counties
- Notchietown – Sequoyah County

== O ==
- Oak Hill-Piney – Delaware County
- Oakhurst – Creek and Tulsa counties
- Old Eucha – Delaware County
- Old Green – Adair County
- Olive – Creek County

== P ==
- Panola – Latimer County
- Park Hill – Cherokee County
- Peavine – Adair County
- Peckham – Kay County
- Peggs – Cherokee County
- Pershing – Osage County
- Pettit – Cherokee County
- Pickett – Pontotoc County
- Pin Oak Acres – Mayes County
- Piney – Adair County
- Pinhook Corner – Sequoyah County
- Platter – Bryan County
- Pontotoc – Johnston County
- Preston – Okmulgee
- Proctor – Adair County
- Pump Back – Mayes County
- Pumpkin Hollow – Cherokee County

== Q ==
- Quay – Pawnee and Payne counties
- Quinlan – Woodward County

== R ==
- Reagan – Johnston County
- Redbird Smith – Sequoyah County
- Remy – Sequoyah County
- River Bottom – Muskogee County
- Rocky Ford – Cherokee and Delaware counties
- Rocky Mountain – Adair County
- Rocky Point – Wagoner County
- Rose – Mayes County

== S ==
- Sams Corner – Mayes County
- Sand Hill – Muskogee County
- Sand Point – Bryan County
- Scipio – Pittsburg County
- Selman – Harper County
- Sequoyah – Rogers County
- Seward – Logan County
- Shady Grove – Cherokee County
- Shady Grove – McIntosh County
- Short – Sequoyah County
- Simms – Muskogee County
- Snake Creek – Mayes County
- Sour John – Muskogee County
- Sparrowhawk – Cherokee County
- Sportsmans Shores – Mayes County
- Steely Hollow – Cherokee County
- Stoney Point – Sequoyah County
- Sumner – Noble County
- Sunray – Stephens County
- Swink – Choctaw County
- Sycamore – Delaware County

== T ==
- Tagg Flats – Delaware County
- Taylor Ferry – Wagoner County
- Tenkiller – Cherokee County
- Teresita – Cherokee County
- Texanna – McIntosh County
- Tiawah – Rogers County
- Titanic – Adair County
- Tonkawa Tribal Housing – Kay County
- Toppers – Wagoner County
- Turley – Tulsa County
- Turpin – Beaver County
- Tuskahoma – Pushmataha County
- Twin Lakes – Logan County
- Twin Oaks – Delaware County

== U ==
- Utica – Bryan County

== V ==
- Vanoss – Pontotoc County

== W ==
- Wardville – Atoka County
- Washita – Caddo County
- Watova – Nowata County
- Wauhillau – Adair County
- Welling – Cherokee County
- Welty – Okfuskee County
- West Peavine – Adair County
- Whipoorwill – Osage County
- White Eagle – Kay County
- White Oak – Craig County
- White Water – Delaware County
- Whitehorn Cove – Wagoner County
- Whitesboro – LeFlore County
- Wickliffe – Mayes County
- Woodall – Cherokee County

== Z ==
- Zeb – Cherokee County
- Zena – Delaware County
- Zion – Adair County
