= List of U.S. communities with Native-American majority populations =

The following is a partial list of United States of America (U.S.) communities with Native-American majority populations. It includes United States cities and towns in which a majority (over half) of the population is Native American (American Indian or Alaska Native), according to data from the 2020 Census.

This list does not include locations in which the 2020 Census shows a plurality of the residents are Native American.

The list is organized by state and, within each state, by population size. It includes 23 states and 656 communities.

This is one of the lists of U.S. cities with non-white majority populations.

CDP - Census Designated Place

== Alaska ==
Place	Type	Total Population	Native Population	Percent Native
Bethel	city	7013	4710	67.16%
Utqiaġvik	city	5584	3127	56.00%
Nome	city	4435	2489	56.12%
Kotzebue	city	3476	2411	69.36%
Dillingham	city	2619	1514	57.81%
Metlakatla	CDP	1664	1275	76.62%
Hooper Bay	city	1388	1337	96.33%
Hoonah	city	1099	580	52.78%
Chevak	city	990	927	93.64%
Emmonak	city	871	794	91.16%
Klawock	city	866	454	52.42%
Point Hope	city	864	765	88.54%
Togiak	city	856	772	90.19%
Savoonga	city	841	813	96.67%
Kwethluk	city	832	792	95.19%
Selawik	city	816	793	97.18%
Quinhagak	city	807	761	94.30%
Unalakleet	city	775	643	82.97%
Alakanuk	city	767	724	94.39%
Kipnuk	CDP	709	685	96.61%
Noorvik	city	704	679	96.45%
Akiachak	CDP	686	648	94.46%
Toksook Bay	city	662	638	96.37%
Kotlik	city	658	654	99.39%
Stebbins	city	658	597	90.73%
Sand Point	city	651	377	57.91%
Gambell	city	642	618	96.26%
Wainwright	city	632	602	95.25%
Pilot Station	city	631	601	95.25%
Kasigluk	CDP	628	600	95.54%
Mountain Village	city	628	591	94.11%
St. Mary's	city	617	569	92.22%
Kake	city	603	469	77.78%
Scammon Bay	city	603	596	98.84%
Nunapitchuk	city	594	581	97.81%
Noatak	CDP	584	542	92.81%
Shishmaref	city	581	557	95.87%
Buckland	city	568	539	94.89%
Aniak	city	558	407	72.94%
New Stuyahok	city	538	484	89.96%
Chefornak	city	535	488	91.21%
Napaskiak	city	515	494	95.92%
Manokotak	city	514	467	90.86%
Nuiqsut	city	514	476	92.61%
Marshall	city	510	480	94.12%
Kongiganak	CDP	500	478	95.60%
Galena	city	497	347	69.82%
St. Michael	city	474	426	89.87%
Kiana	city	473	422	89.22%
Tuntutuliak	CDP	472	459	97.25%
Anaktuvuk Pass	city	466	351	75.32%
Akiak	city	464	444	95.69%
Fort Yukon	city	460	391	85.00%
Tuluksak	CDP	458	430	93.89%
Kivalina	city	447	436	97.54%
Saxman	city	447	316	70.69%
Brevig Mission	city	444	393	88.51%
Russian Mission	city	437	413	94.51%
St. Paul	city	432	374	86.57%
Eek	city	431	397	92.11%
Tununak	CDP	422	400	94.79%
Hydaburg	city	402	335	83.33%
Angoon	city	396	318	80.30%
Atmautluak	CDP	390	375	96.15%
Elim	city	387	340	87.86%
Kwigillingok	CDP	387	375	96.90%
Copper Center	CDP	384	207	53.91%
Napakiak	city	374	341	91.18%
Point Lay	CDP	337	310	91.99%
Koyuk	city	329	296	89.97%
McGrath	city	321	186	57.94%
Huslia	city	319	290	90.91%
Nightmute	city	310	297	95.81%
Nanwalek	CDP	304	230	75.66%
Ambler	city	296	250	84.46%
Nulato	city	291	215	73.88%
Atqasuk	city	290	253	87.24%
Lower Kalskag	city	288	272	94.44%
Kaktovik	city	285	271	95.09%
Shungnak	city	282	263	93.26%
Goodnews Bay	city	270	243	90.00%
Teller	city	263	234	88.97%
Tanana	city	254	202	79.53%
Aleknagik	city	248	168	67.74%
Northway	CDP	237	211	89.03%
Old Harbor	city	234	185	79.06%
Grayling	city	228	205	89.91%
Nunam Iqua	city	227	212	93.39%
Upper Kalskag	city	227	195	85.90%
Newtok	CDP	220	205	93.18%
Shaktoolik	city	214	187	87.38%
Mekoryuk	city	209	196	93.78%
Venetie	CDP	207	191	92.27%
Holy Cross	city	203	169	83.25%
Kobuk	city	202	166	82.18%
Koliganek	CDP	196	177	90.31%
Newhalen	city	191	151	79.06%
Deering	city	189	173	91.53%
White Mountain	city	187	173	92.51%
Allakaket	city	184	155	84.24%
Golovin	city	181	164	90.61%
Port Graham	CDP	181	151	83.43%
Port Lions	city	179	111	62.01%
Tyonek	CDP	179	139	77.65%
Manley Hot Springs	CDP	178	114	64.04%
Kaltag	city	173	147	84.97%
Wales	city	173	151	87.28%
Kokhanok	CDP	170	139	81.76%
Tanacross	CDP	159	125	78.62%
Minto	CDP	157	141	89.81%
Arctic Village	CDP	156	145	92.95%
Nondalton	city	148	119	80.41%
Ruby	city	145	129	88.97%
Mentasta Lake	CDP	142	101	71.13%
Tetlin	CDP	134	114	85.07%
Iliamna	CDP	125	80	64.00%
Pitkas Point	CDP	122	120	98.36%
Twin Hills	CDP	120	98	81.67%
Ouzinkie	city	118	84	71.19%
Ekwok	city	116	98	84.48%
Gulkana	CDP	115	68	59.13%
Chignik	city	114	69	60.53%
Chuathbaluk	city	112	99	88.39%
Sleetmute	CDP	112	80	71.43%
Port Heiden	city	108	86	79.63%
Shageluk	city	104	94	90.38%
Mertarvik	CDP	101	97	96.04%
Koyukuk	city	98	98	100.00%
Tatitlek	CDP	97	77	79.38%
Klukwan	CDP	96	75	78.13%
Nikolai	city	96	76	79.17%
Crooked Creek	CDP	94	88	93.62%
Perryville	CDP	93	81	87.10%
Circle	CDP	91	84	92.31%
Diomede	city	90	79	87.78%
Hughes	city	89	79	88.76%
Chignik Lagoon	CDP	88	61	69.32%
South Naknek	CDP	86	45	52.33%
Pilot Point	city	80	59	73.75%
Levelock	CDP	76	67	88.16%
Anvik	city	75	66	88.00%
Igiugig	CDP	74	54	72.97%
St. George	city	72	63	87.50%
Chistochina	CDP	71	48	67.61%
Chenega	CDP	70	40	57.14%
Oscarville	CDP	70	67	95.71%
Clark's Point	city	68	63	92.65%
Akhiok	city	66	56	84.85%
Rampart	CDP	64	51	79.69%
Chignik Lake	CDP	63	57	90.48%
Platinum	city	62	53	85.48%
Eagle Village	CDP	60	32	53.33%
Chalkyitsik	CDP	59	54	91.53%
Stony River	CDP	57	50	87.72%
Atka	city	55	52	94.55%
Beaver	CDP	49	46	93.88%
Nikolski	CDP	43	28	65.12%
Egegik	city	41	24	58.54%
Nelson Lagoon	CDP	41	38	92.68%
Larsen Bay	city	37	28	75.68%
Stevens Village	CDP	37	37	100.00%
Birch Creek	CDP	36	32	88.89%
Karluk	CDP	33	26	78.79%
Healy Lake	CDP	27	21	77.78%
Red Devil	CDP	26	20	76.92%
Alatna	CDP	15	14	93.33%
Lime Village	CDP	13	12	92.31%
Ugashik	CDP	4	3	75.00%

== Arizona ==
Place	Type	Total Population	Native Population	Percent Native
Tuba City	CDP	8264	7643	92.49%
Kayenta	CDP	4771	4542	95.20%
Chinle	CDP	4668	4195	89.87%
Whiteriver	CDP	4569	4475	97.94%
San Carlos	CDP	4035	3919	97.13%
Fort Defiance	CDP	3645	3317	91.00%
Sacaton	CDP	3323	3114	93.71%
Window Rock	CDP	2561	2455	95.86%
Sells	CDP	2155	2079	96.47%
Cibecue	CDP	1832	1773	96.78%
Bylas	CDP	1789	1769	98.88%
Casa Blanca	CDP	1753	1677	95.66%
Kaibito	CDP	1566	1534	97.96%
North Fork	CDP	1504	1403	93.28%
Tsaile	CDP	1446	1005	69.50%
Lukachukai	CDP	1432	1419	99.09%
St. Michaels	CDP	1430	1317	92.10%
First Mesa	CDP	1355	1336	98.60%
Peridot	CDP	1314	1296	98.63%
LeChee	CDP	1303	1221	93.71%
Many Farms	CDP	1259	1200	95.31%
Blackwater	CDP	1234	1133	91.82%
Dilkon	CDP	1233	1178	95.54%
Canyon Day	CDP	1218	1165	95.65%
Peach Springs	CDP	1121	1068	95.27%
Pinon	CDP	1113	1039	93.35%
Komatke	CDP	1032	969	93.90%
Hotevilla-Bacavi	CDP	1011	988	97.73%
Rainbow City	CDP	1006	994	98.81%
Leupp	CDP	958	924	96.45%
Ak-Chin Village	CDP	953	811	85.10%
Houck	CDP	895	871	97.32%
Ganado	CDP	893	829	92.83%
Maricopa Colony	CDP	890	797	89.55%
Second Mesa	CDP	847	833	98.35%
Hondah	CDP	829	770	92.88%
Moenkopi	CDP	788	762	96.70%
Whitecone	CDP	783	764	97.57%
Chilchinbito	CDP	773	763	98.71%
Cameron	CDP	747	720	96.39%
Seven Mile	CDP	746	736	98.66%
Kykotsmovi Village	CDP	744	722	97.04%
Shongopovi	CDP	714	707	99.02%
St. Johns	CDP	706	666	94.33%
East Fork	CDP	680	670	98.53%
Upper Santan Village	CDP	674	651	96.59%
Round Rock	CDP	664	631	95.03%
Low Mountain	CDP	652	629	96.47%
Gila Crossing	CDP	650	604	92.92%
Stotonic Village	CDP	644	567	88.04%
Sanders	CDP	605	474	78.35%
Sacaton Flats Village	CDP	593	553	93.25%
Dennehotso	CDP	590	584	98.98%
Sawmill	CDP	567	560	98.77%
Rock Point	CDP	561	534	95.19%
Nazlini	CDP	518	505	97.49%
Teec Nos Pos	CDP	515	497	96.50%
Burnside	CDP	500	476	95.20%
McNary	CDP	500	467	93.40%
Shonto	CDP	499	488	97.80%
Winslow West	CDP	489	262	53.58%
Goodyear Village	CDP	480	422	87.92%
Santa Rosa	CDP	477	472	98.95%
Tonalea	CDP	454	444	97.80%
Lower Santan Village	CDP	440	417	94.77%
Rough Rock	CDP	431	421	97.68%
Tees Toh	CDP	425	418	98.35%
Greasewood	CDP	378	368	97.35%
Turkey Creek	CDP	377	377	100.00%
Cedar Creek	CDP	376	363	96.54%
Bitter Springs	CDP	364	350	96.15%
Red Mesa	CDP	360	322	89.44%
Pisinemo	CDP	359	359	100.00%
Jeddito	CDP	353	338	95.75%
Wet Camp Village	CDP	307	290	94.46%
East Globe	CDP	269	247	91.82%
Keams Canyon	CDP	267	232	86.89%
Sacate Village	CDP	265	252	95.09%
Del Muerto	CDP	258	258	100.00%
Indian Wells	CDP	245	226	92.24%
Chuichu	CDP	241	233	96.68%
Steamboat	CDP	238	234	98.32%
Topawa	CDP	234	232	99.15%
Tolani Lake	CDP	228	223	97.81%
Cornfields	CDP	221	220	99.55%
San Miguel	CDP	205	203	99.02%
Poston	CDP	203	168	82.76%
Klagetoh	CDP	184	181	98.37%
South Komelik	CDP	176	173	98.30%
Cottonwood	CDP	168	167	99.40%
Sehili	CDP	160	152	95.00%
Anegam	CDP	150	149	99.33%
Kaibab	CDP	146	120	82.19%
Red Rock (Apache County)	CDP	136	136	100.00%
Maish Vaya	CDP	133	129	96.99%
Gu Oidak	CDP	131	124	94.66%
Seba Dalkai	CDP	127	124	97.64%
Sweet Water Village	CDP	127	117	92.13%
Ali Chuk	CDP	126	119	94.44%
Fort Apache	CDP	118	108	91.53%
Ali Chukson	CDP	115	112	97.39%
Oljato-Monument Valley	CDP	115	114	99.13%
Cowlic	CDP	107	105	98.13%
Vaiva Vo	CDP	98	91	92.86%
Carrizo	CDP	93	85	91.40%
Cutter	CDP	91	78	85.71%
Wahak Hotrontk	CDP	89	87	97.75%
Kaka	CDP	84	81	96.43%
Haivana Nakya	CDP	72	71	98.61%
Ali Molina	CDP	61	61	100.00%
Mojave Ranch Estates	CDP	58	35	60.34%
Oak Springs	CDP	54	53	98.15%
Ak Chin	CDP	52	50	96.15%
Ventana	CDP	52	52	100.00%
Chiawuli Tak	CDP	51	47	92.16%
Comobabi	CDP	44	44	100.00%
Ko Vaya	CDP	43	42	97.67%
Valentine	CDP	42	34	80.95%
Santa Cruz	CDP	39	39	100.00%
Hard Rock	CDP	38	38	100.00%
Kohatk	CDP	38	37	97.37%
Charco	CDP	28	27	96.43%
Wide Ruins	CDP	22	19	86.36%
Lupton	CDP	20	17	85.00%
Tat Momoli	CDP	19	17	89.47%
Nolic	CDP	12	9	75.00%
Toyei	CDP	3	2	66.67%

== California ==
Place	Type	Total Population	Native Population	Percent Native
Hoopa	CDP	3404	2853	83.81%
Pala	CDP	1639	953	58.15%
Weitchpec	CDP	132	90	68.18%
Kep'el	CDP	85	66	77.65%
Wautec	CDP	49	32	65.31%

== Colorado ==
Place	Type	Total Population	Native Population	Percent Native
Towaoc	CDP	1152	1098	95.31%

== Connecticut ==
Place	Type	Total Population	Native Population	Percent Native
Mashantucket	CDP	581	367	63.17%

== Idaho ==
Place	Type	Total Population	Native Population	Percent Native
Fort Hall	CDP	3351	2324	69.35%
Lapwai	city	1259	1012	80.38%
De Smet	CDP	152	131	86.18%

== Kansas ==
Place	Type	Total Population	Native Population	Percent Native
Kickapoo Tribal Center	CDP	183	161	87.98%
Kickapoo Site 1	CDP	123	102	82.93%
Kickapoo Site 7	CDP	110	100	90.91%
Kickapoo Site 5	CDP	60	51	85.00%
Kickapoo Site 2	CDP	29	26	89.66%

== Minnesota ==
Place	Type	Total Population	Native Population	Percent Native
Red Lake	CDP	1822	1764	96.82%
Mahnomen	city	1426	731	51.26%
Redby	CDP	1328	1293	97.36%
Little Rock	CDP	1038	1010	97.30%
Vineland	CDP	923	804	87.11%
Cass Lake	city	738	536	72.63%
Ponemah	CDP	602	596	99.00%
White Earth	CDP	555	508	91.53%
Naytahwaush	CDP	541	479	88.54%
Waubun	city	486	263	54.12%
Ball Club	CDP	382	313	81.94%
Riverland	CDP	328	281	85.67%
Pine Point	CDP	283	274	96.82%
Rice Lake	CDP	283	245	86.57%
Mahnomen	CDP	252	199	78.97%
Nett Lake	CDP	241	224	92.95%
Ogema	city	221	118	53.39%
Inger	CDP	204	190	93.14%
Twin Lakes	CDP	200	145	72.50%
Bena	city	160	121	75.63%
Elbow Lake	CDP	138	85	61.59%
Beaulieu	CDP	126	78	61.90%
Squaw Lake	city	100	56	56.00%
West Roy Lake	CDP	63	52	82.54%
Ebro	CDP	59	35	59.32%
Pine Bend	CDP	41	24	58.54%
South End	CDP	39	31	79.49%
Midway	CDP	26	15	57.69%
The Ranch	CDP	17	13	76.47%

== Mississippi ==
Place	Type	Total Population	Native Population	Percent Native
Bogue Chitto	CDP	915	773	84.48%
Redwater	CDP	704	495	70.31%
Tucker	CDP	670	588	87.76%
Standing Pine	CDP	543	444	81.77%
Pearl River	CDP	3977	3289	82.70%
Conehatta	CDP	1452	1127	77.62%

== Montana ==
Place	Type	Total Population	Native Population	Percent Native
Hardin	city	4129	2112	51.15%
Wolf Point	city	2807	1521	54.19%
North Browning	CDP	2727	2587	94.87%
Pablo	CDP	2362	1376	58.26%
South Browning	CDP	2022	1930	95.45%
Lame Deer	CDP	1959	1828	93.31%
Crow Agency	CDP	1691	1612	95.33%
Fort Belknap Agency	CDP	1593	1519	95.35%
Rocky Boy West	CDP	1065	1027	96.43%
Browning	town	1048	969	92.46%
Hays	CDP	1023	951	92.96%
Poplar	city	834	611	73.26%
Harlem	city	826	517	62.59%
Ashland	CDP	818	544	66.50%
Busby	CDP	746	681	91.29%
Muddy	CDP	662	627	94.71%
Pryor	CDP	648	564	87.04%
Heart Butte	CDP	627	589	93.94%
Lodge Grass	town	456	413	90.57%
Rocky Boy's Agency	CDP	423	387	91.49%
Parker School	CDP	389	383	98.46%
East Glacier Park Village	CDP	386	242	62.69%
Boneau	CDP	372	356	95.70%
St. Pierre	CDP	371	355	95.69%
Brockton	CDP	366	338	92.35%
Frazer	CDP	366	337	92.08%
Azure	CDP	323	313	96.90%
Sangrey	CDP	320	306	95.63%
Lodge Pole	CDP	303	286	94.39%
Turtle Lake	CDP	289	218	75.43%
Starr School	CDP	273	266	97.44%
Elmo	CDP	253	185	73.12%
Big Arm	CDP	235	131	55.74%
Little Browning	CDP	223	214	95.96%
Wyola	CDP	199	170	85.43%
Babb	CDP	133	116	87.22%
Dodson	town	133	97	72.93%
Blackfoot	CDP	124	101	81.45%
Birney	CDP	99	94	94.95%
Old Agency	CDP	84	68	80.95%
St. Xavier	CDP	80	44	55.00%
Laredo	CDP	37	24	64.86%

== Nebraska ==
Place	Type	Total Population	Native Population	Percent Native
Macy	CDP	1058	1032	97.54%
Winnebago	village	943	868	92.05%
Walthill	village	695	555	79.86%
Santee	village	453	406	89.62%

== Nevada ==
Place	Type	Total Population	Native Population	Percent Native
Wadsworth	CDP	1092	695	63.64%
Owyhee	CDP	1066	940	88.18%
Schurz	CDP	721	594	82.39%
Nixon	CDP	473	444	93.87%
Sutcliffe	CDP	311	190	61.09%
Fort McDermitt	CDP	273	260	95.24%

== New Mexico ==
Place	Type	Total Population	Native Population	Percent Native
Shiprock	CDP	7861	7455	94.84%
Zuni Pueblo	CDP	6261	6084	97.17%
Dulce	CDP	2979	2559	85.90%
Crownpoint	CDP	2965	2661	89.75%
San Felipe Pueblo	CDP	2563	2519	98.28%
Santo Domingo Pueblo	CDP	2539	2306	90.82%
Thoreau	CDP	2458	2076	84.46%
Jemez Pueblo	CDP	1988	1953	98.24%
Navajo	CDP	1981	1893	95.56%
Upper Fruitland	CDP	1655	1604	96.92%
Waterflow	CDP	1651	926	56.09%
Skyline-Ganipa	CDP	1637	1593	97.31%
Church Rock	CDP	1569	1523	97.07%
Ohkay Owingeh	CDP	1532	1274	83.16%
Mescalero	CDP	1513	1394	92.13%
Laguna	CDP	1303	1227	94.17%
Taos Pueblo	CDP	1275	1095	85.88%
Black Rock	CDP	1218	1062	87.19%
Iyanbito	CDP	1198	1181	98.58%
Alamo	CDP	1177	1103	93.71%
Twin Lakes	CDP	1018	996	97.84%
Santa Clara Pueblo	CDP	991	804	81.13%
Prewitt	CDP	876	810	92.47%
Isleta	CDP	820	760	92.68%
Rock Springs	CDP	814	797	97.91%
Mesita	CDP	811	700	86.31%
Fruitland	CDP	808	466	57.67%
Tohatchi	CDP	802	707	88.15%
Napi Headquarters	CDP	800	751	93.88%
Sundance	CDP	796	747	93.84%
Yah-ta-hey	CDP	793	651	82.09%
Zia Pueblo	CDP	769	755	98.18%
Paraje	CDP	720	685	95.14%
Ojo Amarillo	CDP	711	689	96.91%
San Ildefonso Pueblo	CDP	683	476	69.69%
Santa Ana Pueblo	CDP	676	662	97.93%
Pinehill	CDP	615	567	92.20%
Nenahnezad	CDP	590	570	96.61%
Williams Acres	CDP	517	315	60.93%
Newcomb	CDP	505	448	88.71%
Pinedale	CDP	503	480	95.43%
Cochiti	CDP	495	466	94.14%
Seama	CDP	485	463	95.46%
Paguate	CDP	483	456	94.41%
Pueblo of Sandia Village	CDP	442	395	89.37%
Tse Bonito	CDP	392	307	78.32%
White Cliffs	CDP	391	283	72.38%
North Acomita Village	CDP	383	285	74.41%
McCartys Village	CDP	365	355	97.26%
Nakaibito	CDP	358	349	97.49%
Acomita Lake	CDP	350	332	94.86%
Fort Wingate	CDP	339	307	90.56%
Sanostee	CDP	325	321	98.77%
Pueblo Pintado	CDP	321	306	95.33%
Tesuque Pueblo	CDP	316	286	90.51%
Crystal	CDP	307	296	96.42%
Becenti	CDP	295	294	99.66%
Torreon	CDP	292	262	89.73%
Brimhall Nizhoni	CDP	287	283	98.61%
Nageezi	CDP	279	276	98.92%
Naschitti	CDP	273	262	95.97%
Sheep Springs	CDP	270	262	97.04%
Beclabito	CDP	267	260	97.38%
Haystack	CDP	234	230	98.29%
Ojo Encino	CDP	230	207	90.00%
Encinal	CDP	212	202	95.28%
Continental Divide	CDP	194	102	52.58%
Purty Rock	CDP	184	115	62.50%
Chical	CDP	135	114	84.44%
South Acomita Village	CDP	132	127	96.21%
Borrego Pass	CDP	120	115	95.83%
Pueblito	CDP	100	72	72.00%
Picuris Pueblo	CDP	96	75	78.13%
Lake Valley	CDP	78	52	66.67%
Manuelito	CDP	72	58	80.56%
Anzac Village	CDP	68	67	98.53%
Mountain View	CDP	59	54	91.53%
Red Rock Ranch	CDP	39	23	58.97%
Black Hat	CDP	12	11	91.67%

== New York ==
Place	Type	Total Population	Native Population	Percent Native
Akwesasne	CDP	4695	3932	83.75%

== North Carolina ==
Place	Type	Total Population	Native Population	Percent Native
Pembroke	town	3038	1987	65.40%
Cherokee	CDP	2389	1852	77.52%
Prospect	CDP	905	818	90.39%
Hollister	CDP	673	385	57.21%
Elrod	CDP	400	300	75.00%
Raemon	CDP	215	145	67.44%
Wakulla	CDP	118	97	82.20%

== North Dakota ==
Place	Type	Total Population	Native Population	Percent Native
New Town	city	3022	2031	67.21%
Belcourt	CDP	1547	1373	88.75%
Fort Totten	CDP	1184	1138	96.11%
Shell Valley	CDP	1176	1120	95.24%
Parshall	city	1040	613	58.94%
Cannon Ball	CDP	904	829	91.70%
Mandaree	CDP	726	655	90.22%
Dunseith	city	658	555	84.35%
Green Acres	CDP	625	593	94.88%
Four Bears Village	CDP	530	465	87.74%
East Dunseith	CDP	510	487	95.49%
White Shield	CDP	389	334	85.86%
St. John	city	341	246	72.14%
Porcupine	CDP	204	190	93.14%
Fort Yates	city	182	167	91.76%
Selfridge	city	130	95	73.08%
Oberon	city	126	64	50.79%
Solen	city	74	42	56.76%
Warwick	city	61	31	50.82%

== Oklahoma ==
Place	Type	Total Population	Native Population	Percent Native
Anadarko	city	6685	3374	50.47%
Stilwell	city	4161	2364	56.81%
Briggs	CDP	1163	606	52.11%
Kenwood	CDP	977	577	59.06%
Moodys	CDP	961	483	50.26%
Kansas	town	801	452	56.43%
Cherry Tree	CDP	783	595	75.99%
Fairfield	CDP	727	417	57.36%
Lyons Switch	CDP	593	332	55.99%
White Eagle	CDP	535	416	77.76%
Rocky Mountain	CDP	517	297	57.45%
Eldon	CDP	413	207	50.12%
Barber	CDP	368	188	51.09%
Twin Oaks	CDP	366	202	55.19%
Tonkawa Tribal Housing	CDP	354	273	77.12%
Wauhillau	CDP	340	203	59.71%
Rocky Ford	CDP	317	185	58.36%
Nicut	CDP	309	171	55.34%
Oaks	town	300	201	67.00%
Titanic	CDP	285	162	56.84%
Greasy	CDP	281	166	59.07%
Red Rock	town	276	205	74.28%
Proctor	CDP	212	112	52.83%
Bell	CDP	211	159	75.36%
Marble City	town	211	119	56.40%
Oak Hill-Piney	CDP	209	121	57.89%
Pumpkin Hollow	CDP	194	99	51.03%
Honey Hill	CDP	191	97	50.79%
Pinhook Corner	CDP	164	83	50.61%
Mulberry	CDP	109	68	62.39%
Johnson Prairie	CDP	106	54	50.94%
Marietta	CDP	98	50	51.02%
Flute Springs	CDP	97	62	63.92%
Etta	CDP	95	54	56.84%
Cave Spring	CDP	84	48	57.14%
Bull Hollow	CDP	62	52	83.87%
Connerville	CDP	61	34	55.74%
Zion	CDP	36	22	61.11%
Old Eucha	CDP	29	18	62.07%
Bryant	CDP	19	10	52.63%
Brush Creek	CDP	17	10	58.82%

== Oregon ==
Place	Type	Total Population	Native Population	Percent Native
Warm Springs	CDP	2578	2358	91.47%
Mission	CDP	1044	797	76.34%
Chiloquin	city	839	462	55.07%
Kirkpatrick	CDP	173	95	54.91%
Cayuse	CDP	75	44	58.67%
Beatty	CDP	63	32	50.79%

== South Dakota ==
Place	Type	Total Population	Native Population	Percent Native
Pine Ridge	CDP	3198	3038	95.00%
Sisseton	city	2680	1496	55.82%
North Eagle Butte	CDP	1927	1827	94.81%
Rosebud	CDP	1481	1398	94.40%
Eagle Butte	city	1324	1153	87.08%
Oglala	CDP	1319	1242	94.16%
Fort Thompson	CDP	1263	1176	93.11%
Mission	city	1205	1017	84.40%
Martin	city	1082	571	52.77%
Kyle	CDP	963	903	93.77%
Porcupine	CDP	932	916	98.28%
Antelope	CDP	849	823	96.94%
Agency Village	CDP	818	749	91.56%
Lake Andes	city	781	399	51.09%
Lower Brule	CDP	726	686	94.49%
Wanblee	CDP	688	647	94.04%
Marty	CDP	680	657	96.62%
Parmelee	CDP	607	602	99.18%
McLaughlin	city	603	428	70.98%
White River	city	596	321	53.86%
Manderson-White Horse Creek	CDP	563	548	97.34%
Timber Lake	city	561	328	58.47%
West Brule	CDP	545	537	98.53%
Dupree	city	506	422	83.40%
St. Francis	town	483	452	93.58%
Allen	CDP	461	455	98.70%
Little Eagle	CDP	372	361	97.04%
Wounded Knee	CDP	364	363	99.73%
Enemy Swim	CDP	315	262	83.17%
Bullhead	CDP	313	303	96.81%
Cherry Creek	CDP	293	249	84.98%
Long Hollow	CDP	288	235	81.60%
Sicangu Village	CDP	288	273	94.79%
Two Strike	CDP	286	279	97.55%
Wakpala	CDP	277	262	94.58%
White Horse	CDP	242	230	95.04%
Spring Creek	CDP	240	235	97.92%
Soldier Creek	CDP	210	204	97.14%
Horse Creek	CDP	193	185	95.85%
Peever	town	193	130	67.36%
Okreek	CDP	191	171	89.53%
La Plant	CDP	174	161	92.53%
Norris	CDP	153	145	94.77%
Kenel	CDP	132	127	96.21%
Peever Flats	CDP	131	126	96.18%
Corn Creek	CDP	122	107	87.70%
Swift Bird	CDP	119	116	97.48%
Whitehorse	CDP	109	101	92.66%
Batesland	town	107	95	88.79%
Ideal	CDP	92	85	92.39%
Stephan	CDP	76	59	77.63%
Ravinia	town	74	43	58.11%
Bridger	CDP	52	46	88.46%
Lantry	CDP	35	27	77.14%
Green Grass	CDP	22	18	81.82%

== Utah ==
Place	Type	Total Population	Native Population	Percent Native
Oljato-Monument Valley	CDP	715	637	89.09%
Fort Duchesne	CDP	584	502	85.96%
Navajo Mountain	CDP	459	356	77.56%
Aneth	CDP	438	418	95.43%
Montezuma Creek	CDP	297	280	94.28%
Halchita	CDP	275	270	98.18%
Whiterocks	CDP	224	203	90.63%
Randlett	CDP	197	160	81.22%
White Mesa	CDP	180	168	93.33%
Tselakai Dezza	CDP	98	95	96.94%

== Washington ==
Place	Type	Total Population	Native Population	Percent Native
Coulee Dam	town	1316	667	50.68%
Port Gamble Tribal Community	CDP	1097	661	60.26%
Neah Bay	CDP	1056	817	77.37%
White Swan	CDP	860	673	78.26%
Taholah	CDP	796	726	91.21%
Nisqually Indian Community	CDP	741	461	62.21%
North Omak	CDP	730	485	66.44%
Skokomish	CDP	682	498	73.02%
Inchelium	CDP	446	371	83.18%
Qui-nai-elt Village	CDP	333	292	87.69%
Nespelem Community	CDP	307	265	86.32%
Elmer City	town	255	142	55.69%
Keller	CDP	253	190	75.10%
Nespelem	town	197	174	88.32%
Queets	CDP	156	129	82.69%
Santiago	CDP	57	38	66.67%
Disautel	CDP	48	37	77.08%

== Wisconsin ==
Place	Type	Total Population	Native Population	Percent Native
Lac du Flambeau	CDP	1931	1620	83.89%
Legend Lake	CDP	1740	1238	71.15%
Little Round Lake	CDP	1332	1127	84.61%
Keshena	CDP	1274	1218	95.60%
Neopit	CDP	625	603	96.48%
Chief Lake	CDP	618	448	72.49%
Mole Lake	CDP	584	438	75.00%
New Odanah	CDP	473	448	94.71%
Reserve	CDP	366	296	80.87%
New Post	CDP	325	189	58.15%
Mission	CDP	320	275	85.94%
Birch Hill	CDP	308	279	90.58%
Middle Village	CDP	305	275	90.16%
Sand Pillow	CDP	283	238	84.10%
Franks Field	CDP	174	148	85.06%
Zoar	CDP	109	101	92.66%
Paac Ciinak	CDP	99	71	71.72%
Ceex Haci	CDP	93	80	86.02%
Diaperville	CDP	67	66	98.51%
Odanah	CDP	49	44	89.80%

== Wyoming ==
Place	Type	Total Population	Native Population	Percent Native
Fort Washakie	CDP	1714	1544	90.08%
Arapahoe	CDP	1698	1337	78.74%
Ethete	CDP	1461	1322	90.49%
Boulder Flats	CDP	493	345	69.98%

== See also ==
- List of U.S. counties with Native American majority populations
