= Bell, Oklahoma (disambiguation) =

Bell, Oklahoma is a census-designated place in Adair County, Oklahoma. It may also refer to:

- Bell, an extinct post office in Le Flore County, Oklahoma
- Bell, a loosely settled unincorporated community built up around the rural Bell Elementary School in Adair County, Oklahoma
