= Peavine =

Peavine may refer to:

- Merrimac, California, formerly Peavine
- Peavine, Oklahoma
- Peavine Peak
- West Peavine, Oklahoma
- any of several plants in the genus Lathyrus
- Vicia americana, Great Basin plant in the Pea family
