= Chance, Oklahoma =

Unincorporated community in Oklahoma, US

- Census-designated place
- Location within Oklahoma Location within the United States
- Coordinates: 36°03′39″N 94°38′52″W
- Country: United States
- State: Oklahoma
- County: Adair

Area
  - Total: 6.35 sq mi (16.45 km^{2})
  - Land: 6.33 sq mi (16.40 km^{2})
  - Water: 0.019 sq mi (0.05 km^{2})
- Elevation: 1,201 ft (366 m)

Population (2020)
  - Total: 215
  - Density: 34.0/sq mi (13.11/km^{2})
- Time zone: UTC-6 (Central (CST))
  - Summer (DST): UTC-5 (CDT)
- ZIP Codes: 74965 (Westville); 74964 (Watts)
- Area codes: 918/539
- FIPS code: 40-13475
- GNIS feature ID: 2805310

Chance is a census-designated place (CDP) in Adair County, Oklahoma, United States. As of the 2020 census, Chance had a population of 215.

The CDP is in northern Adair County, along Chewey Road, which leads east 4 miles (6 km) to U.S. Route 59 between Watts and Westville, and northwest 7 miles (11 km) to Chewey.

== Demographics ==
Historical population
Census	Pop.	Note	%±
2020	215		—
U.S. Decennial Census

=== 2020 census ===
As of the 2020 census, Chance had a population of 215. The median age was 48.4 years. 17.2% of residents were under the age of 18 and 25.6% of residents were 65 years of age or older. For every 100 females there were 68.0 males, and for every 100 females age 18 and over there were 81.6 males age 18 and over.

0.0% of residents lived in urban areas, while 100.0% lived in rural areas.

There were 88 households in Chance, of which 29.5% had children under the age of 18 living in them. Of all households, 64.8% were married-couple households, 23.9% were households with a male householder and no spouse or partner present, and 9.1% were households with a female householder and no spouse or partner present. About 15.9% of all households were made up of individuals and 5.6% had someone living alone who was 65 years of age or older.

There were 93 housing units, of which 5.4% were vacant. The homeowner vacancy rate was 0.0% and the rental vacancy rate was 6.7%.

Racial composition as of the 2020 census
Race	Number	Percent
White	80	37.2%
Black or African American	0	0.0%
American Indian and Alaska Native	66	30.7%
Asian	19	8.8%
Native Hawaiian and Other Pacific Islander	0	0.0%
Some other race	5	2.3%
Two or more races	45	20.9%
Hispanic or Latino (of any race)	17	7.9%

== Education ==
It is mostly in the Westville Public Schools school district, with a piece in the Watts Public Schools school district.
