= Ballard, Oklahoma =

Township in Oklahoma, US

The Township of Ballard is a township located in Adair County, Oklahoma, United States, approximately 1.5 miles south of the city limits of Watts, and administered by the Watts city government. The community is locally referred to as Ballard Hill.

Nearby Ballard Creek is a tributary of the Illinois River.

Ballard is located at 36°05′40″N 94°35′22″W (36.0945269, -94.5893877)
