= Leon Pense =

American football player (1922–2015)

No. 18
- Position: Back

Personal information
- Born: February 5, 1922; Chewey, Oklahoma, U.S.
- Died: January 22, 2015 (aged 92); Crockett, Texas, U.S.
- Listed height: 6 ft 0 in (1.83 m)
- Listed weight: 170 lb (77 kg)

Career information
- High school: Bartlesville (OK)
- College: Arkansas
- NFL draft: 1945: 9th round, 79th overall pick

Career history
- Pittsburgh Steelers (1945)

Awards and highlights
- First-team All-SWC (1943)

Career NFL statistics
- Rushing yards: 1
- Rushing average: 0.2
- Receptions: 1
- Receiving yards: 32
- Stats at Pro Football Reference

James Leon Pense (February 5, 1922 – January 22, 2015) was an American professional football blocking back who played one season with the Pittsburgh Steelers. He played college football at the University of Arkansas and attended Bartlesville High School in Bartlesville, Oklahoma.
