= Salem, Oklahoma =

Unincorporated community in Oklahoma, US

- Census-designated place
- Location within Adair County and the state of Oklahoma
- Coordinates: 35°45′40″N 94°34′22″W
- Country: United States
- State: Oklahoma
- County: Adair

Area
  - Total: 3.3 sq mi (8.6 km^{2})
  - Land: 3.3 sq mi (8.6 km^{2})
  - Water: 0 sq mi (0.0 km^{2})
- Elevation: 1,096 ft (334 m)

Population (2010)
  - Total: 112
  - Density: 34/sq mi (13/km^{2})
- Time zone: UTC-6 (Central (CST))
  - Summer (DST): UTC-5 (CDT)
- FIPS code: 40-64875
- GNIS feature ID: 2409236

Salem is a census-designated place (CDP) in Adair County, Oklahoma, United States. The population was 112 at the 2010 census.

== Geography ==
According to the United States Census Bureau, the CDP has a total area of 3.3 square miles (8.5 km^{2}), all land.

== Demographics ==
As of the census of 2000, there were 89 people, 40 households, and 26 families residing in the CDP. The population density was 26.8 inhabitants per square mile (10.3/km^{2}). There were 46 housing units at an average density of 13.9/sq mi (5.3/km^{2}). The racial makeup of the CDP was 49.44% White, 42.70% Native American, and 7.87% from two or more races. Hispanic or Latino of any race were 1.12% of the population.

There were 40 households, out of which 30.0% had children under the age of 18 living with them, 52.5% were married couples living together, 7.5% had a female householder with no husband present, and 35.0% were non-families. 32.5% of all households were made up of individuals, and 10.0% had someone living alone who was 65 years of age or older. The average household size was 2.23 and the average family size was 2.81.

In the CDP, the population was spread out, with 21.3% under the age of 18, 9.0% from 18 to 24, 27.0% from 25 to 44, 29.2% from 45 to 64, and 13.5% who were 65 years of age or older. The median age was 40 years. For every 100 females, there were 78.0 males. For every 100 females age 18 and over, there were 84.2 males.

The median income for a household in the CDP was $21,875, and the median income for a family was $20,625. Males had a median income of $10,000 versus $16,250 for females. The per capita income for the CDP was $7,281. There were 35.3% of families and 34.3% of the population living below the poverty line, including 38.5% of under eighteens and 28.6% of those over 64.
