= Honey Hill, Oklahoma =

Unincorporated community in Oklahoma, US

- Census-designated place
- Location within Oklahoma Location within the United States
- Coordinates: 35°46′10″N 94°34′18″W
- Country: United States
- State: Oklahoma
- County: Adair

Area
  - Total: 2.93 sq mi (7.58 km^{2})
  - Land: 2.92 sq mi (7.57 km^{2})
  - Water: 0.0039 sq mi (0.01 km^{2})
- Elevation: 1,276 ft (389 m)

Population (2020)
  - Total: 160
  - Density: 54.7/sq mi (21.13/km^{2})
- Time zone: UTC-6 (Central (CST))
  - Summer (DST): UTC-5 (CDT)
- ZIP Code: 74960 (Stillwell)
- Area codes: 918/539
- FIPS code: 40-35875
- GNIS feature ID: 2805325

Honey Hill is a census-designated place (CDP) in Adair County, Oklahoma, United States. Within the Cherokee Nation, it was first listed as a CDP prior to the 2020 census. As of the 2020 census, Honey Hill had a population of 160.

The CDP is in southeastern Adair County, bordered to the north by Elm Grove and to the south by Bell. It is 6 miles (10 km) southeast of Stilwell, the county seat.

== Demographics ==
Historical population
Census	Pop.	Note	%±
2020	160		—
U.S. Decennial Census

=== 2020 census ===
As of the 2020 census, Honey Hill had a population of 160. The median age was 38.6 years. 29.4% of residents were under the age of 18 and 10.0% of residents were 65 years of age or older. For every 100 females there were 138.8 males, and for every 100 females age 18 and over there were 197.4 males age 18 and over.

0.0% of residents lived in urban areas, while 100.0% lived in rural areas.

There were 64 households in Honey Hill, of which 28.1% had children under the age of 18 living in them. Of all households, 70.3% were married-couple households, 18.8% were households with a male householder and no spouse or partner present, and 3.1% were households with a female householder and no spouse or partner present. About 12.5% of all households were made up of individuals and 7.8% had someone living alone who was 65 years of age or older.

There were 65 housing units, of which 1.5% were vacant. The homeowner vacancy rate was 1.9% and the rental vacancy rate was 0.0%.

Racial composition as of the 2020 census
Race	Number	Percent
White	62	38.8%
Black or African American	0	0.0%
American Indian and Alaska Native	66	41.2%
Asian	0	0.0%
Native Hawaiian and Other Pacific Islander	0	0.0%
Some other race	1	0.6%
Two or more races	31	19.4%
Hispanic or Latino (of any race)	4	2.5%
