= Watts Community, Oklahoma =

Unincorporated community in Oklahoma, US

- Location within the state of Oklahoma
- Coordinates: 36°03′12″N 94°33′46″W
- Country: United States
- State: Oklahoma
- County: Adair

Area
  - Total: 18.5 sq mi (48.0 km^{2})
  - Land: 17.8 sq mi (46.2 km^{2})
  - Water: 0.69 sq mi (1.8 km^{2})
- Elevation: 1,132 ft (345 m)

Population (2000)
  - Total: 500
  - Density: 28/sq mi (10.8/km^{2})
- Time zone: UTC-6 (Central (CST))
  - Summer (DST): UTC-5 (CDT)
- FIPS code: 40-79125
- GNIS feature ID: 2409535

Watts Community is a former census-designated place (CDP) in Adair County, Oklahoma, United States. The population was 500 at the 2000 census.

== Geography ==
According to the United States Census Bureau, the community had a total area of 18.5 square miles (48 km^{2}), of which 17.8 square miles (46 km^{2}) was land and 0.7 square miles (1.8 km^{2}), 3.78%, was water.

== Demographics ==
As of the census of 2000, there were 500 people, 192 households, and 144 families residing in the CDP. The population density was 28.0 inhabitants per square mile (10.8/km^{2}). There were 213 housing units at an average density of 11.9 units per square mile (4.6 units/km^{2}). The racial makeup of the CDP was 68.00% White, 16.80% Native American, 0.80% from other races, and 14.40% from two or more races. Hispanic or Latino of any race were 1.20% of the population.

There were 192 households, out of which 30.7% had children under the age of 18 living with them, 64.1% were married couples living together, 4.7% had a female householder with no husband present, and 25.0% were non-families. 21.4% of all households were made up of individuals, and 8.9% had someone living alone who was 65 years of age or older. The average household size was 2.60 and the average family size was 3.00.

In the CDP, the population was spread out, with 25.4% under the age of 18, 9.0% from 18 to 24, 26.6% from 25 to 44, 25.6% from 45 to 64, and 13.4% who were 65 years of age or older. The median age was 38 years. For every 100 females, there were 111.0 males. For every 100 females age 18 and over, there were 109.6 males.

The median income for a household in the CDP was $33,125, and the median income for a family was $39,643. Males had a median income of $25,887 versus $19,750 for females. The per capita income for the CDP was $12,271. About 10.1% of families and 15.4% of the population were below the poverty line, including 13.8% of those under age 18 and 11.1% of those age 65 or over.
