= Lyons, Oklahoma =

Unincorporated community in Oklahoma, US

Coordinates: 35°45′04″N 94°42′40″W

Lyons is an unincorporated community located near the Kansas City Southern rail line in Adair County, Oklahoma, United States.
