= Piney, Oklahoma =

Unincorporated community in Oklahoma, US

- Census-designated place
- Location within Adair County and the state of Oklahoma
- Coordinates: 35°53′15″N 94°33′13″W
- Country: United States
- State: Oklahoma
- County: Adair

Area
  - Total: 4.58 sq mi (11.86 km^{2})
  - Land: 4.52 sq mi (11.70 km^{2})
  - Water: 0.062 sq mi (0.16 km^{2})
- Elevation: 1,122 ft (342 m)

Population (2020)
  - Total: 101
  - Density: 22.4/sq mi (8.63/km^{2})
- Time zone: UTC-6 (Central (CST))
  - Summer (DST): UTC-5 (CDT)
- FIPS code: 40-59100
- GNIS feature ID: 2584389

Piney is a census-designated place (CDP) in Adair County, Oklahoma, United States. As of the 2020 census, Piney had a population of 101. Piney was the "head town" of the first wave of relocated Cherokee people (the "Old Settlers") who relocated there from their ancestral homelands in the southeastern United States.

== History ==
Piney was established in the Arkansaw Territory, in 1824, as the head town of the Cherokee in the West. It served as the council seat (informal capital) of the Cherokee Nation–West from 1824 to 1828. The town was located on the lands of Lovely's Purchase, that straddled what was to become the Indian Territory—Arkansas state line. In 1828, the eastern border of the Indian Territory was finally drawn (running just one mile east of the settlement), and the old Arkansaw Territory was split into two. A permanent Cherokee Nation capital city was also being built in the more centrally located Tahlonteeskee (in Sequoyah County,) located deeper in the new Indian Territory. Most of the Cherokee residents of Piney soon migrated further west into their designated districts in the Indian Territory following the split. A Baptist missionary, Duncan O'Bryant, who had served in Piney for a time, remained behind. He died in 1834 and his grave is located there.

Piney had a post office from November 24, 1913, to August 20, 1921. The town reached its largest size circa 1916. It had a general store (where the post office was located); a gristmill; a blacksmith's shop; and a school, which is now used as a community building. The incorporated town continued until 1940. The original settlement of Piney is now considered a ghost town, although some residents still live in the area (2011).

== Geography ==
Piney is located in eastern Adair County, 1 mile (2 km) west of the Arkansas border. The Piney CDP has a total area of 4.6 square miles (11.9 km^{2}), of which 4.5 square miles (11.7 km^{2}) is land and 0.077 square miles (0.2 km^{2}), or 1.32%, is water.

== Demographics ==
Historical population
| Census | Pop. | Note | %± |
|---|---|---|---|
| 2010 | 115 | | — |
| 2020 | 101 | | −12.2% |
U.S. Decennial Census

=== 2020 census ===
As of the 2020 census, Piney had a population of 101. The median age was 31.6 years. 32.7% of residents were under the age of 18 and 23.8% of residents were 65 years of age or older. For every 100 females there were 98.0 males, and for every 100 females age 18 and over there were 78.9 males age 18 and over.

0.0% of residents lived in urban areas, while 100.0% lived in rural areas.

There were 39 households in Piney, of which 30.8% had children under the age of 18 living in them. Of all households, 43.6% were married-couple households, 12.8% were households with a male householder and no spouse or partner present, and 28.2% were households with a female householder and no spouse or partner present. About 23.1% of all households were made up of individuals and 12.8% had someone living alone who was 65 years of age or older.

There were 39 housing units, of which 0.0% were vacant. The homeowner vacancy rate was 0.0% and the rental vacancy rate was 0.0%.

Racial composition as of the 2020 census
| Race | Number | Percent |
|---|---|---|
| White | 41 | 40.6% |
| Black or African American | 1 | 1.0% |
| American Indian and Alaska Native | 42 | 41.6% |
| Asian | 0 | 0.0% |
| Native Hawaiian and Other Pacific Islander | 0 | 0.0% |
| Some other race | 1 | 1.0% |
| Two or more races | 16 | 15.8% |
| Hispanic or Latino (of any race) | 7 | 6.9% |

=== 2010 census ===
As of the 2010 United States census, Piney had a population of 115.

== See also ==
- List of ghost towns in Oklahoma
