= Marietta, Adair County, Oklahoma =

Unincorporated community in Oklahoma, US

- Census-designated place
- Location within Adair County and the state of Oklahoma
- Coordinates: 35°50′52″N 94°39′09″W
- Country: United States
- State: Oklahoma
- County: Adair

Area
  - Total: 1.84 sq mi (4.76 km^{2})
  - Land: 1.83 sq mi (4.75 km^{2})
  - Water: 0.0039 sq mi (0.01 km^{2})
- Elevation: 1,145 ft (349 m)

Population (2020)
  - Total: 82
  - Density: 44.7/sq mi (17.25/km^{2})
- Time zone: UTC-6 (Central (CST))
  - Summer (DST): UTC-5 (CDT)
- FIPS code: 40-46488
- GNIS feature ID: 2408177

Marietta is a census-designated place (CDP) in Adair County, Oklahoma, United States. The population was 106 at the 2010 census. The community was listed as Maryetta at the 2000 census, at which time it had a population of 138.

== Education ==
Maryetta's roots go back to the founding of an Indian Day school before Oklahoma statehood, which was replaced by a public school named Maryetta (named after Maryetta Key, daughter of Mike Key, the donor of one acre of land where the school was initially built. Today Maryetta Public schools serve students from pre-k through 8th grade, with students continuing on for high school at other area schools.

== Geography ==
According to the United States Census Bureau, the CDP has a total area of 1.8 square miles (4.7 km^{2}), all land.

== Demographics ==
Historical population
Census	Pop.	Note	%±
2000	138		—
2010	106		−23.2%
2020	82		−22.6%
U.S. Decennial Census

As of the census of 2000, there were 138 people, 47 households, and 33 families residing in the CDP. The population density was 77.3 people per square mile (29.8 people/km^{2}). There were 49 housing units at an average density of 27.4 per square mile (10.6/km^{2}). The racial makeup of the CDP was 39.13% White, 53.62% Native American, and 7.25% from two or more races. Hispanic or Latino of any race were 1.45% of the population.

There were 47 households, out of which 40.4% had children under the age of 18 living with them, 42.6% were married couples living together, 21.3% had a female householder with no husband present, and 27.7% were non-families. 25.5% of all households were made up of individuals, and 12.8% had someone living alone who was 65 years of age or older. The average household size was 2.94 and the average family size was 3.59.

In the CDP, the population was spread out, with 27.5% under the age of 18, 16.7% from 18 to 24, 25.4% from 25 to 44, 18.8% from 45 to 64, and 11.6% who were 65 years of age or older. The median age was 30 years. For every 100 females, there were 102.9 males. For every 100 females age 18 and over, there were 96.1 males.

The median income for a household in the CDP was $16,875, and the median income for a family was $21,250. Males had a median income of $16,667 versus $15,000 for females. The per capita income for the CDP was $7,916. There were 21.9% of families and 36.4% of the population living below the poverty line, including 68.6% of under eighteens and 40.0% of those over 64.
