= Cave Spring, Oklahoma =

Unincorporated community in Oklahoma, US

- Census-designated place
- Location within Oklahoma Location within the United States
- Coordinates: 35°43′45″N 94°45′27″W
- Country: United States
- State: Oklahoma
- County: Adair

Area
  - Total: 4.89 sq mi (12.66 km^{2})
  - Land: 4.85 sq mi (12.57 km^{2})
  - Water: 0.031 sq mi (0.08 km^{2})
- Elevation: 1,093 ft (333 m)

Population (2020)
  - Total: 74
  - Density: 15.3/sq mi (5.89/km^{2})
- Time zone: UTC-6 (Central (CST))
  - Summer (DST): UTC-5 (CDT)
- ZIP Codes: 74931 (Bunch); 74960 (Stilwell)
- Area codes: 918/539
- FIPS code: 40-12910
- GNIS feature ID: 2806995

Cave Spring is a census-designated place (CDP) in Adair County, Oklahoma, United States. Part of the Cherokee Nation, it was first listed as a CDP prior to the 2020 census. As of the 2020 census, Cave Spring had a population of 74.

The CDP is in southwestern Adair County, bordered to the southeast by Bunch and to the northeast by Lyons Switch. Bunch Road crosses the southeast side of the community, leading south 2.5 miles (4.0 km) to Bunch and northeast 12 miles (19 km) to Stilwell, the county seat.

The CDP is hilly and mostly forested, with elevations ranging from 800 to 1,200 feet (240 to 370 m) above sea level. Sallisaw Creek, a south-flowing tributary of the Arkansas River, forms the boundary between Cave Spring and Bunch.

== Demographics ==
Historical population
Census	Pop.	Note	%±
2020	74		—
U.S. Decennial Census

=== 2020 census ===
As of the 2020 census, Cave Spring had a population of 74. The median age was 44.0 years. 23.0% of residents were under the age of 18 and 9.5% of residents were 65 years of age or older. For every 100 females there were 85.0 males, and for every 100 females age 18 and over there were 103.6 males age 18 and over.

0.0% of residents lived in urban areas, while 100.0% lived in rural areas.

There were 26 households in Cave Spring, of which 26.9% had children under the age of 18 living in them. Of all households, 38.5% were married-couple households, 46.2% were households with a male householder and no spouse or partner present, and 0.0% were households with a female householder and no spouse or partner present. About 30.8% of all households were made up of individuals and 7.7% had someone living alone who was 65 years of age or older.

There were 31 housing units, of which 16.1% were vacant. The homeowner vacancy rate was 0.0% and the rental vacancy rate was 0.0%.

Racial composition as of the 2020 census
Race	Number	Percent
White	25	33.8%
Black or African American	0	0.0%
American Indian and Alaska Native	39	52.7%
Asian	0	0.0%
Native Hawaiian and Other Pacific Islander	0	0.0%
Some other race	0	0.0%
Two or more races	10	13.5%
Hispanic or Latino (of any race)	3	4.1%
