= Christie, Oklahoma =

Unincorporated community in Oklahoma, US

- CDP
- Location within Adair County and the state of Oklahoma
- Coordinates: 35°58′16″N 94°39′15″W
- Country: United States
- State: Oklahoma
- County: Adair

Area
  - Total: 9.68 sq mi (25.06 km^{2})
  - Land: 9.59 sq mi (24.84 km^{2})
  - Water: 0.085 sq mi (0.22 km^{2})
- Elevation: 1,063 ft (324 m)

Population (2020)
  - Total: 427
  - Density: 44.5/sq mi (17.19/km^{2})
- Time zone: UTC-6 (Central (CST))
  - Summer (DST): UTC-5 (CDT)
- FIPS code: 40-14350
- GNIS feature ID: 2407610

Christie is a census-designated place (CDP) in Adair County, Oklahoma, United States. As of the 2020 census, Christie had a population of 427.

== Geography ==
According to the United States Census Bureau, the CDP has a total area of 7.8 square miles (20 km^{2}), of which 7.8 square miles (20 km^{2}) is land and 0.04 square miles (0.10 km^{2}) (0.26%) is water.

== Demographics ==
Historical population
Census	Pop.	Note	%±
2000	166		—
2010	218		31.3%
2020	427		95.9%
U.S. Decennial Census

=== 2020 census ===
As of the 2020 census, Christie had a population of 427. The median age was 39.6 years. 28.3% of residents were under the age of 18 and 19.2% of residents were 65 years of age or older. For every 100 females there were 91.5 males, and for every 100 females age 18 and over there were 75.9 males age 18 and over.

0.0% of residents lived in urban areas, while 100.0% lived in rural areas.

There were 149 households in Christie, of which 26.2% had children under the age of 18 living in them. Of all households, 59.7% were married-couple households, 18.1% were households with a male householder and no spouse or partner present, and 17.4% were households with a female householder and no spouse or partner present. About 23.5% of all households were made up of individuals and 7.3% had someone living alone who was 65 years of age or older.

There were 164 housing units, of which 9.1% were vacant. The homeowner vacancy rate was 6.9% and the rental vacancy rate was 0.0%.

Racial composition as of the 2020 census
Race	Number	Percent
White	212	49.6%
Black or African American	1	0.2%
American Indian and Alaska Native	139	32.6%
Asian	2	0.5%
Native Hawaiian and Other Pacific Islander	0	0.0%
Some other race	0	0.0%
Two or more races	73	17.1%
Hispanic or Latino (of any race)	9	2.1%

=== 2000 census ===
As of the census of 2000, there were 166 people, 65 households, and 52 families residing in the CDP. The population density was 21.4 people per square mile (8.3 people/km^{2}). There were 70 housing units at an average density of 9.0 per square mile (3.5/km^{2}). The racial makeup of the CDP was 58.43% White, 0.60% African American, 30.12% Native American, and 10.84% from two or more races. Hispanic or Latino of any race were 0.60% of the population.

There were 65 households, out of which 32.3% had children under the age of 18 living with them, 58.5% were married couples living together, 15.4% had a female householder with no husband present, and 20.0% were non-families. 15.4% of all households were made up of individuals, and 7.7% had someone living alone who was 65 years of age or older. The average household size was 2.55 and the average family size was 2.83.

In the CDP, the population was spread out, with 24.1% under the age of 18, 7.8% from 18 to 24, 29.5% from 25 to 44, 21.7% from 45 to 64, and 16.9% who were 65 years of age or older. The median age was 38 years. For every 100 females, there were 107.5 males. For every 100 females age 18 and over, there were 93.8 males.

The median income for a household in the CDP was $19,063, and the median income for a family was $27,656. Males had a median income of $25,893 versus $17,143 for females. The per capita income for the CDP was $9,268. About 17.8% of families and 17.0% of the population were below the poverty line, including 12.5% of those under the age of eighteen and 28.0% of those 65 or over.

== Education ==
It is mostly in the Westville Public Schools school district. A small piece is in the Stilwell Public Schools school district.
