= Old Green, Oklahoma =

Unincorporated community in Oklahoma, US

- Census-designated place
- Location within Adair County and the state of Oklahoma
- Coordinates: 35°59′04″N 94°36′14″W
- Country: United States
- State: Oklahoma
- County: Adair

Area
  - Total: 3.16 sq mi (8.18 km^{2})
  - Land: 3.14 sq mi (8.14 km^{2})
  - Water: 0.015 sq mi (0.04 km^{2})
- Elevation: 1,060 ft (320 m)

Population (2020)
  - Total: 310
  - Density: 98.6/sq mi (38.08/km^{2})
- Time zone: UTC-6 (Central (CST))
  - Summer (DST): UTC-5 (CDT)
- FIPS code: 40-55285
- GNIS feature ID: 2584387

Old Green is a census-designated place (CDP) in Adair County, Oklahoma, United States. As of the 2020 census, Old Green had a population of 310.

== Geography ==
Old Green is located along the western edge of the town of Westville. U.S. Route 62 runs east–west through the center of the community, and U.S. Route 59, running north–south, forms most of the eastern border. It is 14 miles (23 km) south to Stilwell, the county seat, 26 miles (42 km) west to Tahlequah, 15 miles (24 km) north to West Siloam Springs on the Arkansas border, and 29 miles (47 km) east to Fayetteville, Arkansas.

According to the United States Census Bureau, the CDP has a total area of 3.2 square miles (8.4 km^{2}), of which 0.023 square miles (0.06 km^{2}), or 0.74%, is water.

== Demographics ==
Historical population
Census	Pop.	Note	%±
2010	315		—
2020	310		−1.6%
U.S. Decennial Census

=== 2020 census ===
As of the 2020 census, Old Green had a population of 310. The median age was 36.3 years. 30.6% of residents were under the age of 18 and 21.6% of residents were 65 years of age or older. For every 100 females there were 109.5 males, and for every 100 females age 18 and over there were 117.2 males age 18 and over.

0.0% of residents lived in urban areas, while 100.0% lived in rural areas.

There were 90 households in Old Green, of which 30.0% had children under the age of 18 living in them. Of all households, 57.8% were married-couple households, 12.2% were households with a male householder and no spouse or partner present, and 25.6% were households with a female householder and no spouse or partner present. About 26.7% of all households were made up of individuals and 18.9% had someone living alone who was 65 years of age or older.

There were 112 housing units, of which 19.6% were vacant. The homeowner vacancy rate was 3.6% and the rental vacancy rate was 5.0%.

Racial composition as of the 2020 census
Race	Number	Percent
White	162	52.3%
Black or African American	0	0.0%
American Indian and Alaska Native	92	29.7%
Asian	4	1.3%
Native Hawaiian and Other Pacific Islander	0	0.0%
Some other race	0	0.0%
Two or more races	52	16.8%
Hispanic or Latino (of any race)	12	3.9%

=== 2010 census ===
As of the 2010 census, the population was 315.

== Education ==
It is in the Westville Public Schools school district.
