= Adair County, Oklahoma =

County in Oklahoma, United States

- County
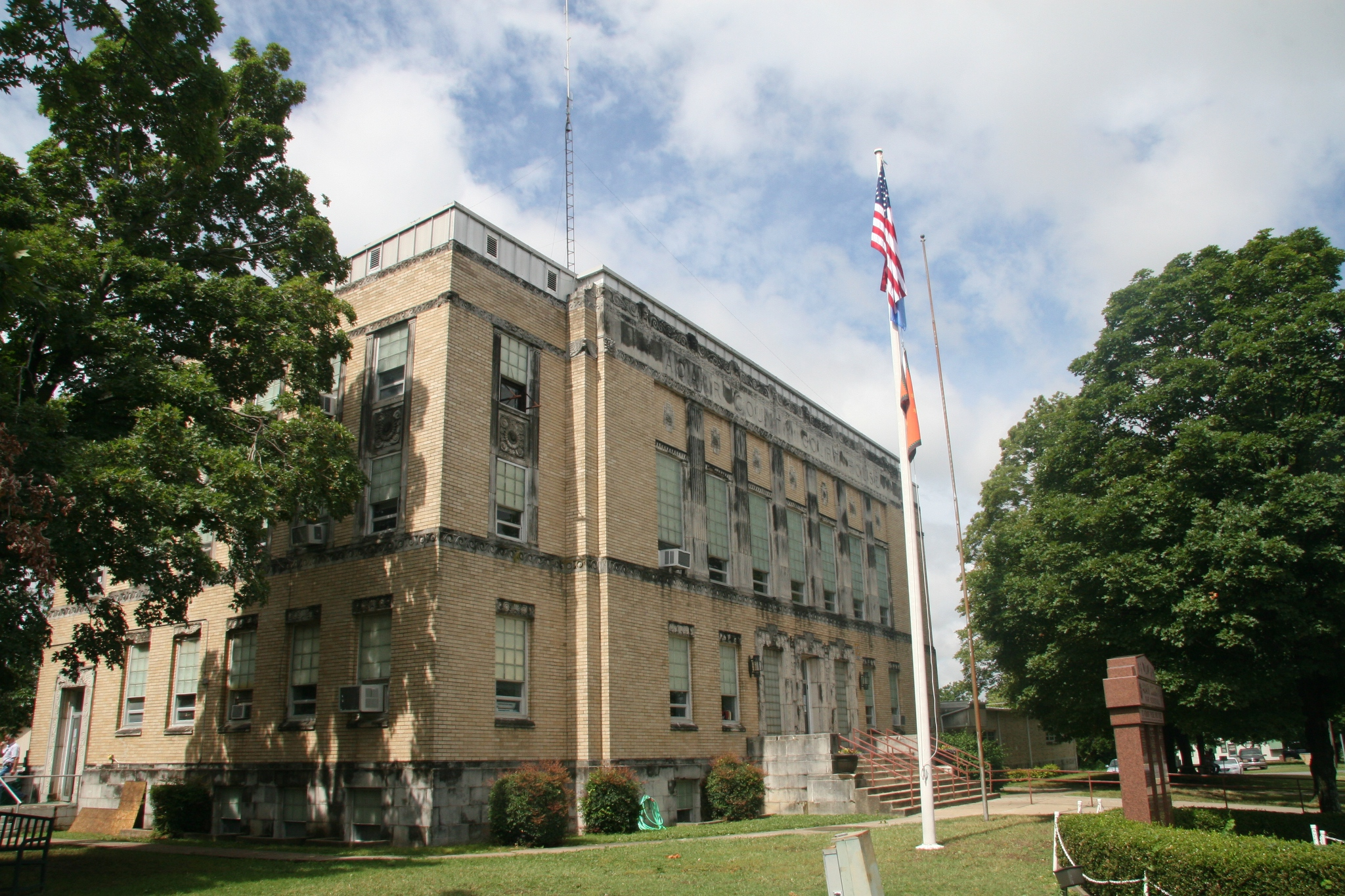
- Adair County Courthouse

- Location within the U.S. state of Oklahoma
- Coordinates: 35°53′N 94°40′W
- Country: United States
- State: Oklahoma
- Founded: July 16, 1907
- Named for: The Adair family of the Cherokee tribe.
- Seat: Stilwell
- Largest city: Stilwell

Area
  - Total: 577 sq mi (1,490 km^{2})
  - Land: 573 sq mi (1,480 km^{2})
  - Water: 3.6 sq mi (9.3 km^{2}) 0.6%

Population (2020)
  - Total: 19,495
  - Estimate (2025): 19,828 ▲
  - Density: 34.0/sq mi (13.1/km^{2})
- Time zone: UTC−6 (Central)
  - Summer (DST): UTC−5 (CDT)
- Congressional district: 2nd

Adair County is a county located in the U.S. state of Oklahoma. As of the 2020 census, the population was 19,495. Its county seat is Stilwell. Adair County was named after the Adair family of the Cherokee tribe. One source says that the county was specifically named for Watt Adair, one of the first Cherokees to settle in the area. Adair County is part of the Cherokee Nation reservation.

== History ==
The county was created in 1906 from the Goingsnake and Flint districts of the Cherokee Nation. There was a decade-long struggle over what town would become the county seat between Stilwell and Westville. When the county was formed, Westville was identified as the county seat, due partly to its location at the intersection of two major railroads: the Kansas City Southern Railway and the St. Louis – San Francisco Railway. The county seat was moved to Stilwell in 1910.

During the Great Depression and World War II, strawberries became a major crop in Adair County. In 1948, the first Stilwell Strawberry Festival was organized. The 2002 festival saw some 40,000 people in attendance.

The 1910 census counted 10,535 residents. By 1990, it was up to 18,421.

== Geography ==
According to the U.S. Census Bureau, the county has a total area of 577 square miles (1,490 km^{2}), of which 573 square miles (1,480 km^{2}) is land and 3.6 square miles (9.3 km^{2}) (0.6%) is water.

The county is part of the Ozark plateau uplift, the tree-covered foothills of the Boston Mountains. North and central Adair County are drained by the Illinois River and three creeks. Two more creeks lie near Stilwell.

=== Major highways ===
- U.S. Highway 59
- U.S. Highway 62
- State Highway 10
- State Highway 51
- State Highway 100

=== Adjacent counties ===
- Delaware County (north)
- Benton County, Arkansas (northeast)
- Washington County, Arkansas (east)
- Crawford County, Arkansas (southeast)
- Sequoyah County (south)
- Cherokee County (west)

=== National protected area ===
- Ozark Plateau National Wildlife Refuge

== Demographics ==
Historical population
Census	Pop.	Note	%±
1910	10,535		—
1920	13,703		30.1%
1930	14,756		7.7%
1940	15,755		6.8%
1950	14,918		−5.3%
1960	13,112		−12.1%
1970	15,141		15.5%
1980	18,575		22.7%
1990	18,421		−0.8%
2000	21,038		14.2%
2010	22,683		7.8%
2020	19,495		−14.1%
2025 (est.)	19,828	▲	1.7%
U.S. Decennial Census; 1790-1960 1900-1990; 1990-2000 2010

Adair County, Oklahoma – Racial composition
Race (NH = Non-Hispanic)	2020	2010	2000	1990	1980
White alone (NH)	38.3% (7,464)	42.1% (9,558)	47.7% (10,035)	55.2% (10,171)	65.9% (12,235)
Black alone (NH)	0.2% (40)	0.2% (53)	0.2% (33)	0% (4)	0% (0)
American Indian alone (NH)	42.3% (8,240)	42% (9,528)	41.8% (8,793)	43.3% (7,985)	33% (6,128)
Asian alone (NH)	0.8% (162)	0.6% (129)	0.1% (18)	0.1% (12)	0.2% (35)
Pacific Islander alone (NH)	0.1% (12)	0% (1)	0% (5)		
Other race alone (NH)	0.1% (12)	0% (7)	0% (4)	0% (4)	0% (4)
Multiracial (NH)	11.9% (2,313)	9.7% (2,210)	7.1% (1,493)	—	—
Hispanic/Latino (any race)	6.4% (1,252)	5.3% (1,197)	3.1% (657)	1.3% (245)	0.9% (173)

=== 2020 census ===
As of the 2020 census, the county had a population of 19,495. Of the residents, 26.0% were under the age of 18 and 17.2% were 65 years of age or older; the median age was 39.4 years. For every 100 females there were 97.2 males, and for every 100 females age 18 and over there were 95.4 males.

The racial makeup of the county was 39.2% White, 0.2% Black or African American, 44.0% American Indian and Alaska Native, 0.8% Asian, 2.3% from some other race, and 13.4% from two or more races. Hispanic or Latino residents of any race comprised 6.4% of the population.

There were 7,076 households in the county, of which 33.2% had children under the age of 18 living with them and 26.6% had a female householder with no spouse or partner present. About 25.1% of all households were made up of individuals and 11.5% had someone living alone who was 65 years of age or older.

There were 8,059 housing units, of which 12.2% were vacant. Among occupied housing units, 71.0% were owner-occupied and 29.0% were renter-occupied. The homeowner vacancy rate was 1.9% and the rental vacancy rate was 9.7%.

In 2020, the most commonly reported ancestries were Cherokee (33.5%), Cherokee Nation (12.8%), English (10.2%), Irish (7.4%), German (6.2%), and Mexican (5.3%).

=== 2010 census ===
As of the census of 2010, Adair County had a small population relative to its surrounding counties, with only 21,038 people, a large percentage of them, 43.3 percent, Native American. The remainder of the population was 43 percent white, 10.5 percent of more than one race, and 5.3 percent Hispanic or Latino. Less than 1 percent of the population was either Black or African American, Asian, or Pacific Islander, and 2.3 percent were identified as other. This makes it the only majority-minority county in Oklahoma. Adair county had a higher percentage of Native Americans (American Indians) in its population than any other Oklahoma county.

The median age of the population was 36.2 years and two-thirds of the county's population were either under the age of 18 (28 percent) or between the ages of 25 and 44 (24.8 percent). Of the remaining population, 25.9 percent were ages 45 to 64, 12.9 percent were 65 years of age or older, and 13.2 percent were ages 18 to 24. For every 100 females there were 100.1 males. For every 100 females age 18 and over, there were 98.3 males.

There were a total of 8,156 households and 5,982 families in the county in 2010. There were 9,142 housing units. Of the 8,156 households, 31.4 percent included children under the age of 18 and slightly more than half (52.7 percent) included married couples living together. 26.7 percent were non-family, 14.2 percent had a female householder with no husband present, and 26.8 percent contained a single individual of 65 years of age or older. The average household size was 2.77 and the average family size was 3.25.

The median income for a household in the county was $27,258, and the median income for a family was $32,930. Males had a median income of $28,370 versus $23,384 for females. The per capita income for the county was $13,560. About 25.3 percent of families and 27.8 percent of the population were below the poverty line, including 36.8 percent of those under age 18 and 18.7 percent of those age 65 or over.

== Politics ==
Voter Registration and Party Enrollment as of March 28, 2024
Party	Number of Voters	Percentage
Democratic	3,406	31.07%
Republican	5,885	53.68%
Others	1,672	15.25%
Total	10,963	100%

United States presidential election results for Adair County, Oklahoma
Year	Republican		Democratic		Third party(ies)	
Year	No.	%	No.	%	No.	%
1908	782	47.86%	825	50.49%	27	1.65%
1912	850	44.18%	916	47.61%	158	8.21%
1916	1,010	41.72%	1,190	49.15%	221	9.13%
1920	2,181	57.99%	1,559	41.45%	21	0.56%
1924	2,317	51.63%	1,942	43.27%	229	5.10%
1928	2,867	59.35%	1,944	40.24%	20	0.41%
1932	1,941	33.74%	3,812	66.26%	0	0.00%
1936	2,699	45.19%	3,257	54.54%	16	0.27%
1940	3,275	50.51%	3,203	49.40%	6	0.09%
1944	2,792	50.18%	2,760	49.60%	12	0.22%
1948	2,407	43.97%	3,067	56.03%	0	0.00%
1952	3,037	52.71%	2,725	47.29%	0	0.00%
1956	3,152	56.59%	2,418	43.41%	0	0.00%
1960	3,655	65.76%	1,903	34.24%	0	0.00%
1964	2,859	48.77%	3,003	51.23%	0	0.00%
1968	2,877	53.02%	1,549	28.55%	1,000	18.43%
1972	4,720	73.12%	1,601	24.80%	134	2.08%
1976	3,013	48.14%	3,183	50.85%	63	1.01%
1980	3,429	54.08%	2,761	43.54%	151	2.38%
1984	4,423	65.57%	2,266	33.60%	56	0.83%
1988	3,558	57.02%	2,624	42.05%	58	0.93%
1992	2,994	45.48%	2,645	40.18%	944	14.34%
1996	2,956	45.33%	2,792	42.82%	773	11.85%
2000	3,503	58.61%	2,361	39.50%	113	1.89%
2004	4,971	65.99%	2,562	34.01%	0	0.00%
2008	4,638	69.33%	2,052	30.67%	0	0.00%
2012	4,381	67.32%	2,127	32.68%	0	0.00%
2016	4,787	73.50%	1,382	21.22%	344	5.28%
2020	5,585	78.57%	1,387	19.51%	136	1.91%
2024	5,860	80.76%	1,289	17.76%	107	1.47%

Although most Native American counties tend to skew Democratic, the Cherokee Nation - which Adair County is a part of - has tended to be deeply Republican at the federal level for most its existence, though Southern Democrats have occasionally taken it in strong election years such as 1964 and 1976. No Democrat has won Adair County since Jimmy Carter in 1976.

== Economy ==
The county is home to food processing and canning industries; poultry farms; cattle ranches; horse breeders; dog breeders, and strawberry fields.

== Communities ==
Map of Adair County

=== City ===
- Stilwell (county seat)

=== Towns ===
- Watts
- Westville

=== Census-designated places ===
- Baron
- Bell
- Bunch
- Cave Spring
- Chance
- Cherry Tree
- Chewey
- Christie
- Elm Grove
- Elohim City
- Fairfield
- Greasy
- Honey Hill
- Lyons Switch
- Marietta
- Mulberry
- Old Green
- Peavine
- Piney
- Proctor
- Rocky Mountain
- Salem (former)
- Titanic
- Watts Community (former)
- Wauhillau
- West Peavine
- Zion

=== Other unincorporated places ===
- Ballard
- Lyons

== NRHP sites ==
The following sites in Adair County are listed on the National Register of Historic Places:

- Adair County Courthouse, Stilwell
- Breadtown, Westville vicinity
- Ballard Creek Roadbed, Westville vicinity
- Buffington Hotel, Westville
- Golda's Mill, Stilwell
- Opera Block, Westville
- Rev. Jesse Bushyhead Grave, Westville

== Education ==
K-12 school districts include:

- Cave Springs Public Schools
- Kansas Public Schools
- Stilwell Public Schools
- Watts Public Schools
- Westville Public Schools

Elementary school districts include:

- Belfonte Public School
- Dahlonegah Public School
- Greasy Public School
- Peavine Public School
- Maryetta Public Schools
- Moseley Public School
- Rocky Mountain Public School
- Zion Public School

In 2010 the Bell Public School school district ceased operations, with area taken by the Belfonte and Stilwell school districts.

== See also ==
- Lovely's Purchase
