= Rocky Mountain, Oklahoma =

Unincorporated community in Oklahoma, US

- Census-designated place
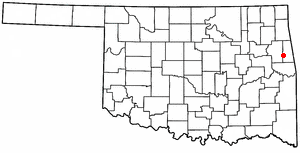
- Location of Rocky Mountain, Oklahoma
- Coordinates: 35°47′46″N 94°46′19″W
- Country: United States
- State: Oklahoma
- County: Adair

Area
  - Total: 15.27 sq mi (39.54 km^{2})
  - Land: 15.25 sq mi (39.50 km^{2})
  - Water: 0.015 sq mi (0.04 km^{2})
- Elevation: 1,119 ft (341 m)

Population (2020)
  - Total: 471
  - Density: 30.9/sq mi (11.92/km^{2})
- Time zone: UTC-6 (Central (CST))
  - Summer (DST): UTC-5 (CDT)
- FIPS code: 40-63720
- GNIS feature ID: 2409199

Rocky Mountain is a census-designated place (CDP) in Adair County, Oklahoma, United States. As of the 2020 census, Rocky Mountain had a population of 471.

== Geography ==
According to the United States Census Bureau, the CDP has a total area of 12.9 square miles (33.3 km^{2}), of which 0.012 square miles (0.03 km^{2}), or 0.08%, is water.

== Demographics ==
Historical population
Census	Pop.	Note	%±
2000	448		—
2010	420		−6.2%
2020	471		12.1%
U.S. Decennial Census

=== 2020 census ===
As of the 2020 census, Rocky Mountain had a population of 471. The median age was 40.6 years. 27.4% of residents were under the age of 18 and 20.4% of residents were 65 years of age or older. For every 100 females there were 118.1 males, and for every 100 females age 18 and over there were 115.1 males age 18 and over.

0.0% of residents lived in urban areas, while 100.0% lived in rural areas.

There were 175 households in Rocky Mountain, of which 30.9% had children under the age of 18 living in them. Of all households, 50.9% were married-couple households, 16.0% were households with a male householder and no spouse or partner present, and 27.4% were households with a female householder and no spouse or partner present. About 18.8% of all households were made up of individuals and 11.4% had someone living alone who was 65 years of age or older.

There were 199 housing units, of which 12.1% were vacant. The homeowner vacancy rate was 0.0% and the rental vacancy rate was 0.0%.

Racial composition as of the 2020 census
Race	Number	Percent
White	171	36.3%
Black or African American	0	0.0%
American Indian and Alaska Native	255	54.1%
Asian	1	0.2%
Native Hawaiian and Other Pacific Islander	0	0.0%
Some other race	0	0.0%
Two or more races	44	9.3%
Hispanic or Latino (of any race)	7	1.5%

=== 2000 census ===
As of the census of 2000, there were 448 people, 156 households, and 117 families residing in the CDP. The population density was 34.7 inhabitants per square mile (13.4/km^{2}). There were 162 housing units at an average density of 12.5/sq mi (4.8/km^{2}). The racial makeup of the CDP was 39.29% White, 0.22% African American, 53.79% Native American, and 6.70% from two or more races. Hispanic or Latino of any race were 0.45% of the population.

There were 156 households, out of which 39.7% had children under the age of 18 living with them, 60.9% were married couples living together, 10.9% had a female householder with no husband present, and 25.0% were non-families. 21.2% of all households were made up of individuals, and 10.3% had someone living alone who was 65 years of age or older. The average household size was 2.87 and the average family size was 3.43.

In the CDP, the population was spread out, with 34.4% under the age of 18, 5.4% from 18 to 24, 28.6% from 25 to 44, 19.9% from 45 to 64, and 11.8% who were 65 years of age or older. The median age was 32 years. For every 100 females, there were 99.1 males. For every 100 females age 18 and over, there were 102.8 males.

The median income for a household in the CDP was $19,886, and the median income for a family was $30,795. Males had a median income of $21,500 versus $18,958 for females. The per capita income for the CDP was $9,735. About 20.0% of families and 22.5% of the population were below the poverty line, including 17.0% of those under age 18 and 34.5% of those age 65 or over.
