= Fairfield, Oklahoma =

Unincorporated community in Oklahoma, US

- Census-designated place
- Location within Adair County and the state of Oklahoma
- Coordinates: 35°50′27″N 94°36′22″W
- Country: United States
- State: Oklahoma
- County: Adair

Area
  - Total: 4.98 sq mi (12.89 km^{2})
  - Land: 4.96 sq mi (12.85 km^{2})
  - Water: 0.015 sq mi (0.04 km^{2})
- Elevation: 1,181 ft (360 m)

Population (2020)
  - Total: 626
  - Density: 126.2/sq mi (48.72/km^{2})
- Time zone: UTC-6 (Central (CST))
  - Summer (DST): UTC-5 (CST)
- FIPS code: 40-24875
- GNIS feature ID: 2408103

Fairfield is a census-designated place (CDP) in Adair County, Oklahoma, United States. As of the 2020 census, Fairfield had a population of 626.

== History ==
Mulberry Mission was founded in Pope County, Arkansas Territory, among the Western Cherokees by Dr. Marcus Palmer (Note: Palmer was a native of Greenwich, Connecticut who had come with his wife to live among the Western Cherokees under the auspices of Boston-based American Board of Commissioners for Foreign Missions in 1821. He served first at Union Mission, then was transferred to Mulberry in November 1829. Mulberry was so named because it was on Mulberry Creek in Arkansas.) It was a branch of Dwight Mission, which moved to Indian Territory and was renamed as the Fairfield Mission, when most of the Cherokees were forced to move there from their former homes in the Southeast. In 1832, The mission established a lending library that contained about 150 books. (Note: This is believed to be the first lending library in the present state of Oklahoma.) Sited on Sallisaw Creek, about 8 miles (13 km) southwest of Stilwell, Oklahoma, the mission closed in 1859. No structures remain in place. The mission cemetery still remains, and it has been renamed as McLemore Cemetery.

== Geography ==
According to Carolyn Foreman's history of the mission, it was 15 miles (24 km) from Evansville, Arkansas, 35 miles (56 km) from Fort Smith and about 35 miles (56 km) from Fort Gibson.

According to the United States Census Bureau, the CDP has a total area of 5.0 square miles (12.9 km^{2}), of which 0.015 square miles (0.04 km^{2}), or 0.30%, is water.

== Demographics ==
Historical population
Census	Pop.	Note	%±
2000	367		—
2010	584		59.1%
2020	626		7.2%
U.S. Decennial Census

=== 2020 census ===
As of the 2020 census, Fairfield had a population of 626. The median age was 43.4 years. 22.0% of residents were under the age of 18 and 15.0% of residents were 65 years of age or older. For every 100 females there were 101.3 males, and for every 100 females age 18 and over there were 92.1 males age 18 and over.

0.0% of residents lived in urban areas, while 100.0% lived in rural areas.

There were 223 households in Fairfield, of which 33.2% had children under the age of 18 living in them. Of all households, 52.9% were married-couple households, 13.0% were households with a male householder and no spouse or partner present, and 30.5% were households with a female householder and no spouse or partner present. About 21.1% of all households were made up of individuals and 9.8% had someone living alone who was 65 years of age or older.

There were 234 housing units, of which 4.7% were vacant. The homeowner vacancy rate was 0.0% and the rental vacancy rate was 3.7%.

Racial composition as of the 2020 census
Race	Number	Percent
White	181	28.9%
Black or African American	0	0.0%
American Indian and Alaska Native	327	52.2%
Asian	0	0.0%
Native Hawaiian and Other Pacific Islander	0	0.0%
Some other race	20	3.2%
Two or more races	98	15.7%
Hispanic or Latino (of any race)	55	8.8%

=== 2000 census ===
As of the census of 2000, there were 367 people, 118 households, and 96 families residing in the CDP. The population density was 102.3 people per square mile (39.5 people/km^{2}). There were 124 housing units at an average density of 34.6 per square mile (13.4/km^{2}). The racial makeup of the CDP was 36.51% White, 49.05% Native American, and 14.44% from two or more races. Hispanic or Latino of any race were 1.63% of the population.

There were 118 households, out of which 44.9% had children under the age of 18 living with them, 59.3% were married couples living together, 13.6% had a female householder with no husband present, and 18.6% were non-families. 16.9% of all households were made up of individuals, and 7.6% had someone living alone who was 65 years of age or older. The average household size was 3.11 and the average family size was 3.45.

In the CDP, the population was spread out, with 36.2% under the age of 18, 8.2% from 18 to 24, 28.6% from 25 to 44, 18.8% from 45 to 64, and 8.2% who were 65 years of age or older. The median age was 29 years. For every 100 females, there were 101.6 males. For every 100 females age 18 and over, there were 90.2 males.

The median income for a household in the CDP was $23,750, and the median income for a family was $26,667. Males had a median income of $23,000 versus $19,722 for females. The per capita income for the CDP was $10,497. About 27.5% of families and 25.5% of the population were below the poverty line, including 25.6% of those under age 18 and 21.1% of those age 65 or over.

== Notable person ==
- Mike Dart, award-winning, contemporary Cherokee basket weaver
