= West Peavine, Oklahoma =

Unincorporated community in Oklahoma, US

- Census-designated place
- Location within Adair County and the state of Oklahoma
- Coordinates: 35°54′33″N 94°38′58″W
- Country: United States
- State: Oklahoma
- County: Adair

Area
  - Total: 7.86 sq mi (20.35 km^{2})
  - Land: 7.80 sq mi (20.19 km^{2})
  - Water: 0.062 sq mi (0.16 km^{2})
- Elevation: 1,243 ft (379 m)

Population (2020)
  - Total: 167
  - Density: 21.4/sq mi (8.27/km^{2})
- Time zone: UTC-6 (Central (CST))
  - Summer (DST): UTC-5 (CDT)
- FIPS code: 40-80230
- GNIS feature ID: 2409561

West Peavine is a census-designated place (CDP) in Adair County, Oklahoma, United States. As of the 2020 census, West Peavine had a population of 167.

== Geography ==
According to the United States Census Bureau, the CDP has a total area of 7.8 square miles (20.3 km^{2}), of which 7.8 square miles (20.2 km^{2}) is land and 0.077 square miles (0.2 km^{2}), or 0.83%, is water.

== Demographics ==
Historical population
Census	Pop.	Note	%±
2020	167		—
U.S. Decennial Census

=== 2020 census ===
As of the 2020 census, West Peavine had a population of 167. The median age was 42.3 years. 17.4% of residents were under the age of 18 and 13.8% of residents were 65 years of age or older. For every 100 females there were 108.8 males, and for every 100 females age 18 and over there were 97.1 males age 18 and over.

0.0% of residents lived in urban areas, while 100.0% lived in rural areas.

There were 65 households in West Peavine, of which 40.0% had children under the age of 18 living in them. Of all households, 58.5% were married-couple households, 20.0% were households with a male householder and no spouse or partner present, and 16.9% were households with a female householder and no spouse or partner present. About 18.5% of all households were made up of individuals and 6.1% had someone living alone who was 65 years of age or older.

There were 82 housing units, of which 20.7% were vacant. The homeowner vacancy rate was 0.0% and the rental vacancy rate was 6.7%.

Racial composition as of the 2020 census
Race	Number	Percent
White	77	46.1%
Black or African American	0	0.0%
American Indian and Alaska Native	61	36.5%
Asian	1	0.6%
Native Hawaiian and Other Pacific Islander	0	0.0%
Some other race	0	0.0%
Two or more races	28	16.8%
Hispanic or Latino (of any race)	1	0.6%

=== 2000 census ===
As of the census of 2000, there were 225 people, 94 households, and 70 families residing in the CDP. The population density was 29.0 inhabitants per square mile (11.2/km^{2}). There were 98 housing units at an average density of 12.6/sq mi (4.9/km^{2}). The racial makeup of the CDP was 47.56% White, 40.00% Native American, and 12.44% from two or more races. Hispanic or Latino of any race were 1.78% of the population.

There were 94 households, out of which 28.7% had children under the age of 18 living with them, 60.6% were married couples living together, 9.6% had a female householder with no husband present, and 25.5% were non-families. 24.5% of all households were made up of individuals, and 10.6% had someone living alone who was 65 years of age or older. The average household size was 2.39 and the average family size was 2.79.

In the CDP, the population was spread out, with 21.8% under the age of 18, 11.1% from 18 to 24, 23.6% from 25 to 44, 28.4% from 45 to 64, and 15.1% who were 65 years of age or older. The median age was 38 years. For every 100 females, there were 116.3 males. For every 100 females age 18 and over, there were 114.6 males.

The median income for a household in the CDP was $18,750, and the median income for a family was $18,333. Males had a median income of $21,607 versus $31,667 for females. The per capita income for the CDP was $13,219. About 26.9% of families and 26.4% of the population were below the poverty line, including 29.3% of those under the age of eighteen and 8.3% of those 65 or over.

== Education ==
It is divided between these school districts: Stilwell Public Schools, Peavine Public School, and Westville Public Schools.
