= Titanic, Oklahoma =

Unincorporated community in Oklahoma, US

Titanic, Oklahoma ᏗᏗᏍᏗ ᏧᏂᏗᏍᏗ (Cherokee)
- Census-designated place
- Location within Adair County and the state of Oklahoma
- Coordinates: 35°53′20″N 94°44′36″W
- Country: United States
- State: Oklahoma
- County: Adair

Area
  - Total: 5.37 sq mi (13.92 km^{2})
  - Land: 5.34 sq mi (13.82 km^{2})
  - Water: 0.039 sq mi (0.10 km^{2})
- Elevation: 1,040 ft (320 m)

Population (2020)
  - Total: 259
  - Density: 48.6/sq mi (18.75/km^{2})
- Time zone: UTC-6 (Central (CST))
  - Summer (DST): UTC-5 (CDT)
- FIPS code: 40-73950
- GNIS feature ID: 2584394

Titanic (Cherokee: ᏗᏗᏍᏗ ᏧᏂᏗᏍᏗ) is a census-designated place (CDP) in Adair County, Oklahoma, United States. As of the 2020 census, Titanic had a population of 259.

A post office was established in Titanic, on January 3, 1916, but discontinued on December 31, 1927, with mail to Stilwell.

== Geography ==
Titanic is located along the northern side of Oklahoma State Highway 51. It is 11 miles (18 km) northwest of Stilwell, the county seat, and 13 miles (21 km) east of Tahlequah in Cherokee County.

According to the United States Census Bureau, the CDP has a total area of 5.4 square miles (13.9 km^{2}), of which 5.3 square miles (13.8 km^{2}) is land and 0.039 square miles (0.1 km^{2}), or 0.72%, is water.

== Demographics ==
Historical population
Census	Pop.	Note	%±
2010	356		—
2020	259		−27.2%
U.S. Decennial Census

=== 2020 census ===
As of the 2020 census, Titanic had a population of 259. The median age was 42.2 years. 23.6% of residents were under the age of 18 and 18.9% of residents were 65 years of age or older. For every 100 females there were 100.8 males, and for every 100 females age 18 and over there were 96.0 males age 18 and over.

0.0% of residents lived in urban areas, while 100.0% lived in rural areas.

There were 106 households in Titanic, of which 25.5% had children under the age of 18 living in them. Of all households, 51.9% were married-couple households, 23.6% were households with a male householder and no spouse or partner present, and 20.8% were households with a female householder and no spouse or partner present. About 33.0% of all households were made up of individuals and 16.0% had someone living alone who was 65 years of age or older.

There were 110 housing units, of which 3.6% were vacant. The homeowner vacancy rate was 0.0% and the rental vacancy rate was 0.0%.

Racial composition as of the 2020 census
Race	Number	Percent
White	95	36.7%
Black or African American	0	0.0%
American Indian and Alaska Native	138	53.3%
Asian	0	0.0%
Native Hawaiian and Other Pacific Islander	0	0.0%
Some other race	0	0.0%
Two or more races	26	10.0%
Hispanic or Latino (of any race)	5	1.9%

=== 2010 census ===
As of the 2010 United States census, Titanic had a population of 356.
