= Bryant, Oklahoma =

- Unincorporated community
- Location within the state of Oklahoma Bryant, Oklahoma (the United States)
- Coordinates: 35°23′32″N 96°03′44″W
- Country: United States
- State: Oklahoma
- County: Okmulgee

Area
  - Total: 0.15 sq mi (0.39 km^{2})
  - Land: 0.15 sq mi (0.39 km^{2})
  - Water: 0 sq mi (0.00 km^{2})
- Elevation: 738 ft (225 m)

Population (2020)
  - Total: 19
  - Density: 124.6/sq mi (48.11/km^{2})
- Time zone: UTC-6 (Central (CST))
  - Summer (DST): UTC-5 (CDT)
- FIPS code: 40-09700
- GNIS feature ID: 2812862

Bryant is a Creek Indian Nation townsite in Okmulgee County, Oklahoma, United States. Bryant is southwest of Henryetta and southeast of the town of Pharoah, being both south of Interstate 40 and east of U.S. Route 75 on Bryant Road.

It is the subject of a book by Mickey J. Martin.

As of the 2020 census, Bryant had a population of 19.

== Demographics ==
Historical population
Census	Pop.	Note	%±
2020	19		—
U.S. Decennial Census

=== 2020 census ===
As of the 2020 census, Bryant had a population of 19. The median age was 50.5 years. 5.3% of residents were under the age of 18 and 21.1% of residents were 65 years of age or older. For every 100 females there were 35.7 males, and for every 100 females age 18 and over there were 38.5 males age 18 and over.

0.0% of residents lived in urban areas, while 100.0% lived in rural areas.

There were 6 households in Bryant, of which 16.7% had children under the age of 18 living in them. Of all households, 100.0% were married-couple households, 0.0% were households with a male householder and no spouse or partner present, and 0.0% were households with a female householder and no spouse or partner present. About 0.0% of all households were made up of individuals and 0.0% had someone living alone who was 65 years of age or older.

There were 13 housing units, of which 53.8% were vacant. The homeowner vacancy rate was 20.0% and the rental vacancy rate was 0.0%.

Racial composition as of the 2020 census
Race	Number	Percent
White	9	47.4%
Black or African American	0	0.0%
American Indian and Alaska Native	10	52.6%
Asian	0	0.0%
Native Hawaiian and Other Pacific Islander	0	0.0%
Some other race	0	0.0%
Two or more races	0	0.0%
Hispanic or Latino (of any race)	1	5.3%
