= Elm Grove, Oklahoma =

Unincorporated community in Oklahoma, US

- Census-designated place
- Location within Adair County and the state of Oklahoma
- Coordinates: 35°47′33″N 94°34′10″W
- Country: United States
- State: Oklahoma
- County: Adair

Area
  - Total: 2.43 sq mi (6.30 km^{2})
  - Land: 2.42 sq mi (6.28 km^{2})
  - Water: 0.0039 sq mi (0.01 km^{2})
- Elevation: 1,017 ft (310 m)

Population (2020)
  - Total: 192
  - Density: 79.2/sq mi (30.56/km^{2})
- Time zone: UTC-6 (Central (CST))
  - Summer (DST): UTC-5 (CDT)
- FIPS code: 40-23575
- GNIS feature ID: 2584379

Elm Grove is a census-designated place (CDP) in Adair County, Oklahoma, United States. As of the 2020 census, Elm Grove had a population of 192.

== Geography ==
Elm Grove is located along Oklahoma State Highway 100. It is 4 miles (6 km) east of Stilwell, the county seat, and 3 miles (5 km) west of the Arkansas border.

According to the United States Census Bureau, the CDP has a total area of 1.7 square miles (4.3 km^{2}), of which 0.0039 square miles (0.01 km^{2}), or 0.25%, is water.

== Demographics ==
Historical population
Census	Pop.	Note	%±
2010	198		—
2020	192		−3.0%
U.S. Decennial Census

=== 2020 census ===
As of the 2020 census, Elm Grove had a population of 192. The median age was 54.1 years. 25.0% of residents were under the age of 18 and 30.7% of residents were 65 years of age or older. For every 100 females there were 74.5 males, and for every 100 females age 18 and over there were 53.2 males age 18 and over.

0.0% of residents lived in urban areas, while 100.0% lived in rural areas.

There were 66 households in Elm Grove, of which 34.8% had children under the age of 18 living in them. Of all households, 63.6% were married-couple households, 16.7% were households with a male householder and no spouse or partner present, and 16.7% were households with a female householder and no spouse or partner present. About 22.7% of all households were made up of individuals and 7.5% had someone living alone who was 65 years of age or older.

There were 83 housing units, of which 20.5% were vacant. The homeowner vacancy rate was 7.7% and the rental vacancy rate was 0.0%.

Racial composition as of the 2020 census
Race	Number	Percent
White	95	49.5%
Black or African American	0	0.0%
American Indian and Alaska Native	49	25.5%
Asian	0	0.0%
Native Hawaiian and Other Pacific Islander	0	0.0%
Some other race	1	0.5%
Two or more races	47	24.5%
Hispanic or Latino (of any race)	13	6.8%

=== 2010 census ===
As of the 2010 census, Elm Grove had a population of 198.
