= Brush Creek, Oklahoma =

- Census-designated place
- Location within the state of Oklahoma
- Coordinates: 36°24′59″N 94°47′02″W
- Country: United States
- State: Oklahoma
- County: Delaware

Area
  - Total: 0.82 sq mi (2.12 km^{2})
  - Land: 0.82 sq mi (2.12 km^{2})
  - Water: 0 sq mi (0.00 km^{2})
- Elevation: 965 ft (294 m)

Population (2020)
  - Total: 14
  - Density: 17.1/sq mi (6.61/km^{2})
- Time zone: UTC-6 (Central (CST))
  - Summer (DST): UTC-5 (CST)
- FIPS code: 40-09612
- GNIS feature ID: 2407912

Brush Creek is an unincorporated community and census-designated place (CDP) in Delaware County, Oklahoma, United States. As of the 2020 census, Brush Creek had a population of 14.

== Geography ==
Brush Creek is located near the center of Delaware County. It is bordered on the northwest by the city of Jay, the county seat, on the north by Oklahoma State Highway 20, and on the south by Brush Creek, a southwest-flowing tributary of Spavinaw Creek and part of the Neosho River watershed.

According to the United States Census Bureau, the Brush Creek CDP has a total area of 0.83 square miles (2.14 km^{2}), all land.

== Demographics ==
Historical population
Census	Pop.	Note	%±
2020	14		—
U.S. Decennial Census

=== 2020 census ===
As of the 2020 census, Brush Creek had a population of 14. The median age was 44.5 years. 0.0% of residents were under the age of 18 and 14.3% of residents were 65 years of age or older. For every 100 females there were 250.0 males, and for every 100 females age 18 and over there were 250.0 males age 18 and over.

0.0% of residents lived in urban areas, while 100.0% lived in rural areas.

There were 6 households in Brush Creek, of which 33.3% had children under the age of 18 living in them. Of all households, 66.7% were married-couple households, 0.0% were households with a male householder and no spouse or partner present, and 16.7% were households with a female householder and no spouse or partner present. About 0.0% of all households were made up of individuals and 0.0% had someone living alone who was 65 years of age or older.

There were 9 housing units, of which 33.3% were vacant. The homeowner vacancy rate was 42.9% and the rental vacancy rate was 0.0%.

Racial composition as of the 2020 census
Race	Number	Percent
White	4	28.6%
Black or African American	0	0.0%
American Indian and Alaska Native	7	50.0%
Asian	0	0.0%
Native Hawaiian and Other Pacific Islander	0	0.0%
Some other race	0	0.0%
Two or more races	3	21.4%
Hispanic or Latino (of any race)	0	0.0%

=== 2000 census ===
As of the census of 2000, there were 41 people, 13 households, and 9 families residing in the community. The population density was 50.1 inhabitants per square mile (19.3/km^{2}). There were 13 housing units at an average density of 15.9/sq mi (6.1/km^{2}). The racial makeup of the community was 31.71% White, 46.34% Native American, 2.44% from other races, and 19.51% from two or more races. Hispanic or Latino of any race were 2.44% of the population.

There were 13 households, out of which 38.5% had children under the age of 18 living with them, 53.8% were married couples living together, 7.7% had a female householder with no husband present, and 23.1% were non-families. 23.1% of all households were made up of individuals, and 15.4% had someone living alone who was 65 years of age or older. The average household size was 3.15 and the average family size was 3.70.

In the community, the population age range was spread out, with 29.3% under the age of 18, 14.6% from 18 to 24, 29.3% from 25 to 44, 12.2% from 45 to 64, and 14.6% who were 65 years of age or older. The median age was 30 years. For every 100 females, there were 105.0 males. For every 100 females age 18 and over, there were 93.3 males.

The median income for a household in the community was $20,625, and the median income for a family was $19,375. Males had a median income of $23,750 versus $0 for females. The per capita income for the community was $10,288. There were no families and 7.7% of the population living below the poverty line, including no under eighteens and none of those over 64.

== Education ==
It is in the Jay Public Schools school district.
