= Tonkawa Tribal Housing, Oklahoma =

- Census-designated place
- Location within Oklahoma Location within the United States
- Coordinates: 36°40′11″N 97°15′59″W
- Country: United States
- State: Oklahoma
- County: Kay

Area
  - Total: 0.42 sq mi (1.09 km^{2})
  - Land: 0.42 sq mi (1.09 km^{2})
  - Water: 0 sq mi (0.00 km^{2})
- Elevation: 988 ft (301 m)

Population (2020)
  - Total: 310
  - Density: 740.0/sq mi (285.71/km^{2})
- Time zone: UTC-6 (Central (CST))
  - Summer (DST): UTC-5 (CDT)
- ZIP Code: 74653 (Tonkawa)
- Area code: 580
- FIPS code: 40-74159
- GNIS feature ID: 2807006

Tonkawa Tribal Housing is a census-designated place (CDP) in Kay County, Oklahoma, United States. It was first listed as a CDP prior to the 2020 census and is inhabited by members of the Tonkawa Tribe of Indians of Oklahoma. As of the 2020 census, Tonkawa Tribal Housing had a population of 310.

The CDP is in southern Kay County, 3 miles (5 km) east of the city of Tonkawa. In addition to residences, the CDP is home to Tonkawa Casino. The community is bordered to the east by the Chikaskia River, a south-flowing tributary of the Salt Fork of the Arkansas River.

== Demographics ==
Historical population
Census	Pop.	Note	%±
2020	310		—
U.S. Decennial Census

=== 2020 census ===
As of the 2020 census, Tonkawa Tribal Housing had a population of 310. The median age was 23.3 years. 46.1% of residents were under the age of 18 and 3.9% of residents were 65 years of age or older. For every 100 females there were 83.4 males, and for every 100 females age 18 and over there were 77.7 males age 18 and over.

0.0% of residents lived in urban areas, while 100.0% lived in rural areas.

There were 84 households in Tonkawa Tribal Housing, of which 40.5% had children under the age of 18 living in them. Of all households, 32.1% were married-couple households, 28.6% were households with a male householder and no spouse or partner present, and 23.8% were households with a female householder and no spouse or partner present. About 25.0% of all households were made up of individuals and 6.0% had someone living alone who was 65 years of age or older.

There were 96 housing units, of which 12.5% were vacant. The homeowner vacancy rate was 13.0% and the rental vacancy rate was 1.5%.

Racial composition as of the 2020 census
Race	Number	Percent
White	23	7.4%
Black or African American	0	0.0%
American Indian and Alaska Native	235	75.8%
Asian	1	0.3%
Native Hawaiian and Other Pacific Islander	4	1.3%
Some other race	6	1.9%
Two or more races	41	13.2%
Hispanic or Latino (of any race)	22	7.1%
