= Greasy, Oklahoma =

Unincorporated community in Oklahoma, US

Greasy, Oklahoma ᎪᎢᎢ (Cherokee)
- Census-designated place
- Location within Adair County and the state of Oklahoma
- Coordinates: 35°40′11″N 94°42′01″W
- Country: United States
- State: Oklahoma
- County: Adair

Area
  - Total: 10.09 sq mi (26.14 km^{2})
  - Land: 10.01 sq mi (25.92 km^{2})
  - Water: 0.085 sq mi (0.22 km^{2})
- Elevation: 889 ft (271 m)

Population (2020)
  - Total: 248
  - Density: 24.8/sq mi (9.57/km^{2})
- Time zone: UTC-6 (Central (CST))
  - Summer (DST): UTC-5 (CDT)
- FIPS code: 40-31165
- GNIS feature ID: 2408326

Greasy is a census-designated place (CDP) in Adair County, Oklahoma, United States. As of the 2020 census, Greasy had a population of 248.

== Geography ==
According to the United States Census Bureau, the CDP has a total area of 20.5 square miles (53.1 km^{2}), of which 20.3 square miles (52.7 km^{2}) is land and 0.15 square miles (0.4 km^{2}), or 0.70%, is water.

== Demographics ==
Historical population
Census	Pop.	Note	%±
2000	387		—
2010	372		−3.9%
2020	248		−33.3%
U.S. Decennial Census

=== 2020 census ===
As of the 2020 census, Greasy had a population of 248. The median age was 42.5 years. 26.2% of residents were under the age of 18 and 16.1% of residents were 65 years of age or older. For every 100 females there were 85.1 males, and for every 100 females age 18 and over there were 88.7 males age 18 and over.

0.0% of residents lived in urban areas, while 100.0% lived in rural areas.

There were 84 households in Greasy, of which 38.1% had children under the age of 18 living in them. Of all households, 56.0% were married-couple households, 19.0% were households with a male householder and no spouse or partner present, and 21.4% were households with a female householder and no spouse or partner present. About 11.9% of all households were made up of individuals and 6.0% had someone living alone who was 65 years of age or older.

There were 97 housing units, of which 13.4% were vacant. The homeowner vacancy rate was 2.6% and the rental vacancy rate was 11.1%.

Racial composition as of the 2020 census
Race	Number	Percent
White	77	31.0%
Black or African American	1	0.4%
American Indian and Alaska Native	133	53.6%
Asian	0	0.0%
Native Hawaiian and Other Pacific Islander	1	0.4%
Some other race	3	1.2%
Two or more races	33	13.3%
Hispanic or Latino (of any race)	21	8.5%

=== 2000 census ===
As of the census of 2000, there were 387 people, 133 households, and 109 families residing in the CDP. The population density was 19.0 people per square mile (7.3 people/km^{2}). There were 146 housing units at an average density of 7.2 per square mile (2.8/km^{2}). The racial makeup of the CDP was 57.11% Native American, 36.43% White, 0.78% from other races, and 5.68% from two or more races. Hispanic or Latino of any race were 3.10% of the population.

There were 133 households, out of which 33.1% had children under the age of 18 living with them, 60.9% were married couples living together, 13.5% had a female householder with no husband present, and 18.0% were non-families. 16.5% of all households were made up of individuals, and 7.5% had someone living alone who was 65 years of age or older. The average household size was 2.91 and the average family size was 3.22.

In the CDP, the population was spread out, with 26.4% under the age of 18, 10.9% from 18 to 24, 24.3% from 25 to 44, 26.1% from 45 to 64, and 12.4% who were 65 years of age or older. The median age was 35 years. For every 100 females, there were 105.9 males. For every 100 females age 18 and over, there were 105.0 males.

The median income for a household in the CDP was $23,750, and the median income for a family was $27,143. Males had a median income of $19,167 versus $17,375 for females. The per capita income for the CDP was $10,988. About 18.8% of families and 17.3% of the population were below the poverty line, including 14.7% of those under age 18 and 42.0% of those age 65 or over.

== Education ==
Almost all of Greasy is in the Dahlonega Public School school district. A piece is in the Cave Springs Public Schools school district.

In 2020, the voters approved the Greasy school district consolidating into the Dahlonega district. At first, the Dahlonega School had grades K-4 and the Greasy school, now controlled by the Dahlonega district, had grades 5-8. In winter 2021 the Dahlonega district was scheduled to close the Greasy School site.

In November 2021, the Greasy School was sold to a Cherokee language immersion school with its first campus in Tahlequah, Oklahoma (Cherokee Immersion School). With Greasy situated in the largest area of Cherokee speakers in the world, the opportunity for this second campus is for students to spend the day in an immersion school and then return to a Cherokee-speaking home.
