= Mulberry, Oklahoma =

Unincorporated community in Oklahoma, US

- Census-designated place
- Location within Adair County and the state of Oklahoma
- Coordinates: 35°51′47″N 94°42′05″W
- Country: United States
- State: Oklahoma
- County: Adair

Area
  - Total: 0.93 sq mi (2.42 km^{2})
  - Land: 0.93 sq mi (2.42 km^{2})
  - Water: 0 sq mi (0.00 km^{2})
- Elevation: 984 ft (300 m)

Population (2020)
  - Total: 96
  - Density: 102.8/sq mi (39.68/km^{2})
- Time zone: UTC-6 (Central (CST))
  - Summer (DST): UTC-5 (CDT)
- FIPS code: 40-49825
- GNIS feature ID: 2584385

Mulberry is a census-designated place (CDP) in Adair County, Oklahoma, United States. As of the 2020 census, Mulberry had a population of 96.

== Geography ==
Mulberry is located along Oklahoma State Highway 51. It is 6 miles (10 km) northwest of Stilwell, the county seat, and 18 miles (29 km) east of Tahlequah in Cherokee County.

According to the United States Census Bureau, the CDP has a total area of 0.93 square miles (2.4 km^{2}), all land.

== Demographics ==
Historical population
Census	Pop.	Note	%±
2010	138		—
2020	96		−30.4%
U.S. Decennial Census

=== 2020 census ===
As of the 2020 census, Mulberry had a population of 96. The median age was 42.0 years. 28.1% of residents were under the age of 18 and 12.5% of residents were 65 years of age or older. For every 100 females there were 146.2 males, and for every 100 females age 18 and over there were 115.6 males age 18 and over.

0.0% of residents lived in urban areas, while 100.0% lived in rural areas.

There were 33 households in Mulberry, of which 18.2% had children under the age of 18 living in them. Of all households, 63.6% were married-couple households, 24.2% were households with a male householder and no spouse or partner present, and 6.1% were households with a female householder and no spouse or partner present. About 24.2% of all households were made up of individuals and 6.1% had someone living alone who was 65 years of age or older.

There were 35 housing units, of which 5.7% were vacant. The homeowner vacancy rate was 0.0% and the rental vacancy rate was 0.0%.

Racial composition as of the 2020 census
Race	Number	Percent
White	28	29.2%
Black or African American	0	0.0%
American Indian and Alaska Native	55	57.3%
Asian	0	0.0%
Native Hawaiian and Other Pacific Islander	0	0.0%
Some other race	0	0.0%
Two or more races	13	13.5%
Hispanic or Latino (of any race)	2	2.1%
