= Chewey, Oklahoma =

Census-designated place in Oklahoma, United States

- Census-designated place
- Location within Adair County and the state of Oklahoma
- Coordinates: 36°06′30″N 94°46′16″W
- Country: United States
- State: Oklahoma
- County: Adair

Area
  - Total: 25.98 sq mi (67.28 km^{2})
  - Land: 25.74 sq mi (66.67 km^{2})
  - Water: 0.24 sq mi (0.61 km^{2})
- Elevation: 971 ft (296 m)

Population (2020)
  - Total: 548
  - Density: 21.3/sq mi (8.22/km^{2})
- Time zone: UTC-6 (Central (CST))
  - Summer (DST): UTC-5 (CDT)
- FIPS code: 40-13850
- GNIS feature ID: 2408022

Chewey is a census-designated place (CDP) in Adair County, Oklahoma, United States. As of the 2020 census, Chewey had a population of 548.

== Geography ==
According to the United States Census Bureau, the CDP has a total area of 21.7 square miles (56.2 km^{2}), of which 21.7 square miles (56.1 km^{2}) is land and 0.039 square miles (0.1 km^{2}), or 0.13%, is water.

== Demographics ==
Historical population
Census	Pop.	Note	%±
2000	135		—
2010	135		0.0%
2020	548		305.9%
U.S. Decennial Census

=== 2020 census ===
As of the 2020 census, Chewey had a population of 548. The median age was 42.3 years. 28.3% of residents were under the age of 18 and 16.6% of residents were 65 years of age or older. For every 100 females there were 100.7 males, and for every 100 females age 18 and over there were 88.9 males age 18 and over.

0.0% of residents lived in urban areas, while 100.0% lived in rural areas.

There were 161 households in Chewey, of which 29.8% had children under the age of 18 living in them. Of all households, 55.9% were married-couple households, 17.4% were households with a male householder and no spouse or partner present, and 19.9% were households with a female householder and no spouse or partner present. About 22.4% of all households were made up of individuals and 9.3% had someone living alone who was 65 years of age or older.

There were 221 housing units, of which 27.1% were vacant. The homeowner vacancy rate was 1.3% and the rental vacancy rate was 22.2%.

Racial composition as of the 2020 census
Race	Number	Percent
White	303	55.3%
Black or African American	8	1.5%
American Indian and Alaska Native	159	29.0%
Asian	3	0.5%
Native Hawaiian and Other Pacific Islander	0	0.0%
Some other race	14	2.6%
Two or more races	61	11.1%
Hispanic or Latino (of any race)	23	4.2%

=== 2010 census ===
As of the 2010 census, the population was 135.

=== 2000 census ===
As of the census of 2000, there were 135 people, 44 households, and 38 families residing in the CDP. The population density was 6.2 people per square mile (2.4 people/km^{2}). There were 48 housing units at an average density of 2.2 per square mile (0.85/km^{2}). The racial makeup of the CDP was 33.33% White, 62.96% Native American, and 3.70% from two or more races. Hispanic or Latino of any race were 0.74% of the population.

There were 44 households, out of which 38.6% had children under the age of 18 living with them, 70.5% were married couples living together, 11.4% had a female householder with no husband present, and 11.4% were non-families. 11.4% of all households were made up of individuals, and 2.3% had someone living alone who was 65 years of age or older. The average household size was 3.07 and the average family size was 3.26.

In the CDP, the population was spread out, with 27.4% under the age of 18, 7.4% from 18 to 24, 30.4% from 25 to 44, 20.0% from 45 to 64, and 14.8% who were 65 years of age or older. The median age was 33 years. For every 100 females, there were 104.5 males. For every 100 females age 18 and over, there were 100.0 males.

The median income for a household in the CDP was $22,500, and the median income for a family was $22,167. Males had a median income of $31,250 versus $16,875 for females. The per capita income for the CDP was $11,201. There were 12.0% of families and 15.2% of the population living below the poverty line, including 19.0% of under eighteens and 7.7% of those over 64.

== Education ==
It is mostly in the Westville Public Schools school district, with a piece in the Kansas Public Schools school district.

== Notable person ==
- Leon Pense - Professional football player with the University of Arkansas and Pittsburgh Steelers (1945).
