= Watts, Oklahoma =

Town in Oklahoma, US

Watts, Oklahoma ᏩᏗᏏ (Cherokee)
- Town
- Location within Adair County and the state of Oklahoma
- Coordinates: 36°6′23″N 94°34′26″W
- Country: United States
- State: Oklahoma
- County: Adair

Area
  - Total: 0.53 sq mi (1.38 km^{2})
  - Land: 0.53 sq mi (1.38 km^{2})
  - Water: 0 sq mi (0.00 km^{2})
- Elevation: 984 ft (300 m)

Population (2020)
  - Total: 227
  - Density: 426.6/sq mi (164.71/km^{2})
- Time zone: UTC-6 (Central (CST))
  - Summer (DST): UTC-5 (CDT)
- ZIP code: 74964
- Area codes: 539/918
- FIPS code: 40-79100
- GNIS feature ID: 2413456

Watts (Cherokee: ᏩᏗᏏ, romanized: Wadisi) is a town in northern Adair County, Oklahoma, United States. It was named for John Watts, also known as Young Tassel, a Chickamauga Cherokee chief, who died in 1802. As of the 2020 census, Watts had a population of 227.

== History ==
Watts is near the site of Old Fort Wayne, which was founded in 1838. The Kansas City Southern Railway (KCS) built a line through the area in 1895-96, and in 1912, relocated its division point from Stillwell to Watts Switch, one mile north of a community called Ballard. (Note: John Watts died well before the forced emigration of the Cherokees and never lived in the Indian Territory, his family settled in this area after the Trail of Tears.) Most of Ballard's merchants moved to the new community of Watts, along with gamblers, land speculators, construction workers and KCS employees. (Note: The Township of Ballard is a township located in Adair County, Oklahoma, approximately 1.5 miles (2.4 km) south of the city limits of Watts, Oklahoma, and administered by the Watts city government. The community is locally referred to as Ballard Hill. Ballard is located at 36°05′40″N 94°35′22″W (36.0945269, -94.5893877))

Frank C. Adair and Frank Howard organized the Guarantee Bank. After statehood, Adair also became the first sheriff of Adair County. Several other businesses sprang up in Watts. Hotels and rooming houses catered to the construction workers and railroad travelers. A lumberyard moved from Ballard, a hardware store and two livery stables were not far behind. At some point in these early days, three doctors opened practices in town. No doubt their patients supported the two drug stores in town. Prosperity had apparently come to Watts, because A. W. Willey opened a bakery and a man called "Cigar" Smith moved from Stilwell to manufacture cigars. The local newspaper, the Watts Watchman, began publication sometime in the 1910s. A post office was established inside a store March 30, 1912.

The town began to decline even before the Great Depression took hold. KCS, like many American railroads, fell on hard times between World War I and World War II. During this period, KCS began dismantling its operations in Watts. It removed the roundhouse, coal chute, water pump station, icehouse, and water tower, as they were no longer needed. The depot, razed in the 1980s, was the last thing to go. Idled workers had to find work elsewhere.

No census data were reported at either the time of statehood or the 1910 U.S. Census. An unofficial estimate of 300 residents was made in 1913. The first official count was 396 at the 1920 census. This declined to 353 in 1930, then reached its bottom of 267 in 1950, before rising to 326 in 1970, and going back to 303 in 1990.

By 2000, Watts had only two feed mill businesses. Most of the employed residents commuted to work in other towns, especially Siloam Springs, Arkansas, which was only 6 miles (9.7 km) north.

== Geography ==
According to the United States Census Bureau, the town has a total area of 0.4 square miles (1.0 km^{2}), all land.

Watts is located on U.S. Highway 59 9 miles (14 km) north of Westville.

Nearby Ballard Creek is a tributary of the Illinois River.

== Demographics ==
Historical population
Census	Pop.	Note	%±
1920	396		—
1930	353		−10.9%
1940	307		−13.0%
1950	267		−13.0%
1960	268		0.4%
1970	326		21.6%
1980	316		−3.1%
1990	303		−4.1%
2000	316		4.3%
2010	324		2.5%
2020	227		−29.9%
U.S. Decennial Census

=== 2020 census ===
As of the 2020 census, Watts had a population of 227. The median age was 35.9 years. 26.9% of residents were under the age of 18 and 10.6% of residents were 65 years of age or older. For every 100 females there were 106.4 males, and for every 100 females age 18 and over there were 102.4 males age 18 and over.

0.0% of residents lived in urban areas, while 100.0% lived in rural areas.

There were 82 households in Watts, of which 53.7% had children under the age of 18 living in them. Of all households, 34.1% were married-couple households, 24.4% were households with a male householder and no spouse or partner present, and 26.8% were households with a female householder and no spouse or partner present. About 24.4% of all households were made up of individuals and 6.1% had someone living alone who was 65 years of age or older.

There were 93 housing units, of which 11.8% were vacant. The homeowner vacancy rate was 0.0% and the rental vacancy rate was 0.0%.

Racial composition as of the 2020 census
Race	Number	Percent
White	138	60.8%
Black or African American	0	0.0%
American Indian and Alaska Native	53	23.3%
Asian	0	0.0%
Native Hawaiian and Other Pacific Islander	0	0.0%
Some other race	9	4.0%
Two or more races	27	11.9%
Hispanic or Latino (of any race)	28	12.3%

=== 2000 census ===
As of the census of 2000, there were 316 people, 103 households, and 73 families residing in the town. The population density was 861.0 inhabitants per square mile (332.4/km^{2}). There were 120 housing units at an average density of 326.9 per square mile (126.2/km^{2}). The racial makeup of the town was 66.14% White, 0.32% African American, 24.68% Native American, 0.63% Asian, 1.58% from other races, and 6.65% from two or more races. 3.16% of the population were Hispanic or Latino of any race.

There were 103 households, out of which 36.9% had children under the age of 18 living with them, 58.3% were married couples living together, 9.7% had a female householder with no husband present, and 28.2% were non-families. 27.2% of all households were made up of individuals, and 14.6% had someone living alone who was 65 years of age or older. The average household size was 2.76 and the average family size was 3.35.

In the town, the population was 27.2% under the age of 18, 10.4% from 18 to 24, 28.5% from 25 to 44, 21.5% from 45 to 64, and 12.3% who were 65 years of age or older. The median age was 35 years. For every 100 females, there were 93.9 males. For every 100 females age 18 and over, there were 94.9 males.

The median income for a household in the town was $26,417, and the median income for a family was $27,250. Males had a median income of $25,543 versus $18,393 for females. The per capita income for the town was $9,356. 19.7% of the population and 9.6% of families were below the poverty line. Out of the total population, 21.6% of those under the age of 18 and none of those 65 and older were living below the poverty line.

== Education ==
It is in the Watts Public Schools school district.

== See also ==
John Watts
