= Peavine, Oklahoma =

Unincorporated community in Oklahoma, US

- Census-designated place
- Location within Adair County and the state of Oklahoma
- Coordinates: 35°52′16″N 94°36′37″W
- Country: United States
- State: Oklahoma
- County: Adair

Area
  - Total: 9.42 sq mi (24.39 km^{2})
  - Land: 9.35 sq mi (24.22 km^{2})
  - Water: 0.066 sq mi (0.17 km^{2})
- Elevation: 1,135 ft (346 m)

Population (2020)
  - Total: 372
  - Density: 39.8/sq mi (15.36/km^{2})
- Time zone: UTC-6 (Central (CST))
  - Summer (DST): UTC-5 (CDT)
- FIPS code: 40-57875
- GNIS feature ID: 2409044

Peavine is a census-designated place (CDP) in Adair County, Oklahoma, United States. As of the 2020 census, Peavine had a population of 372.

== Geography ==
According to the United States Census Bureau, the CDP has a total area of 9.4 square miles (24.4 km^{2}), of which 9.3 square miles (24.2 km^{2}) is land and 0.077 square miles (0.2 km^{2}), or 0.70%, is water.

== Demographics ==
Historical population
Census	Pop.	Note	%±
2000	358		—
2010	423		18.2%
2020	372		−12.1%
U.S. Decennial Census

=== 2020 census ===
As of the 2020 census, Peavine had a population of 372. The median age was 45.6 years. 25.5% of residents were under the age of 18 and 23.4% of residents were 65 years of age or older. For every 100 females there were 113.8 males, and for every 100 females age 18 and over there were 92.4 males age 18 and over.

0.0% of residents lived in urban areas, while 100.0% lived in rural areas.

There were 129 households in Peavine, of which 20.9% had children under the age of 18 living in them. Of all households, 55.0% were married-couple households, 13.2% were households with a male householder and no spouse or partner present, and 31.0% were households with a female householder and no spouse or partner present. About 27.9% of all households were made up of individuals and 10.9% had someone living alone who was 65 years of age or older.

There were 144 housing units, of which 10.4% were vacant. The homeowner vacancy rate was 3.7% and the rental vacancy rate was 14.3%.

Racial composition as of the 2020 census
Race	Number	Percent
White	160	43.0%
Black or African American	0	0.0%
American Indian and Alaska Native	140	37.6%
Asian	11	3.0%
Native Hawaiian and Other Pacific Islander	1	0.3%
Some other race	5	1.3%
Two or more races	55	14.8%
Hispanic or Latino (of any race)	21	5.6%

=== 2000 census ===
As of the census of 2000, there were 358 people, 131 households, and 104 families residing in the CDP. The population density was 37.9 inhabitants per square mile (14.6/km^{2}). There were 141 housing units at an average density of 14.9 per square mile (5.8/km^{2}). The racial makeup of the CDP was 44.13% White, 51.96% Native American, and 3.91% from two or more races. Hispanic or Latino of any race were 0.28% of the population.

There were 131 households, out of which 38.9% had children under the age of 18 living with them, 63.4% were married couples living together, 13.0% had a female householder with no husband present, and 20.6% were non-families. 19.1% of all households were made up of individuals, and 7.6% had someone living alone who was 65 years of age or older. The average household size was 2.73 and the average family size was 3.13.

In the CDP, the population was spread out, with 27.7% under the age of 18, 5.3% from 18 to 24, 33.2% from 25 to 44, 22.9% from 45 to 64, and 10.9% who were 65 years of age or older. The median age was 34 years. For every 100 females, there were 98.9 males. For every 100 females age 18 and over, there were 96.2 males.

The median income for a household in the CDP was $31,250, and the median income for a family was $34,531. Males had a median income of $24,028 versus $18,889 for females. The per capita income for the CDP was $11,416. About 18.6% of families and 16.7% of the population were below the poverty line, including 20.8% of those under age 18 and 26.9% of those age 65 or over.

== Education ==
The majority of its territory is in the Peavine Public School school district. Parts are in the Stilwell Public Schools school district and the Westville Public Schools school district.
