= Zion, Oklahoma =

Unincorporated community in Oklahoma, US

- Census-designated place
- Location within Adair County and the state of Oklahoma
- Coordinates: 35°47′21″N 94°38′16″W
- Country: United States
- State: Oklahoma
- County: Adair

Area
  - Total: 1.03 sq mi (2.66 km^{2})
  - Land: 1.02 sq mi (2.65 km^{2})
  - Water: 0.0039 sq mi (0.01 km^{2})
- Elevation: 1,060 ft (320 m)

Population (2020)
  - Total: 30
  - Density: 29/sq mi (11.3/km^{2})
- Time zone: UTC-6 (Central (CST))
  - Summer (DST): UTC-5 (CDT)
- FIPS code: 40-83125
- GNIS feature ID: 2409647

Zion is a census-designated place (CDP) in Adair County, Oklahoma, United States. As of the 2020 census, Zion had a population of 30.

== Geography ==
According to the United States Census Bureau, the CDP has a total area of 1.7 square miles (4.4 km^{2}), all land.

== Demographics ==
Historical population
Census	Pop.	Note	%±
2020	30		—
U.S. Decennial Census

=== 2020 census ===
As of the 2020 census, Zion had a population of 30. The median age was 60.5 years. 13.3% of residents were under the age of 18 and 36.7% of residents were 65 years of age or older. For every 100 females there were 66.7 males, and for every 100 females age 18 and over there were 62.5 males age 18 and over.

0.0% of residents lived in urban areas, while 100.0% lived in rural areas.

There were 8 households in Zion, of which 0.0% had children under the age of 18 living in them. Of all households, 100.0% were married-couple households, 0.0% were households with a male householder and no spouse or partner present, and 0.0% were households with a female householder and no spouse or partner present. About 0.0% of all households were made up of individuals and 0.0% had someone living alone who was 65 years of age or older.

There were 12 housing units, of which 33.3% were vacant. The homeowner vacancy rate was 0.0% and the rental vacancy rate was 0.0%.

Racial composition as of the 2020 census
Race	Number	Percent
White	4	13.3%
Black or African American	0	0.0%
American Indian and Alaska Native	18	60.0%
Asian	0	0.0%
Native Hawaiian and Other Pacific Islander	0	0.0%
Some other race	2	6.7%
Two or more races	6	20.0%
Hispanic or Latino (of any race)	3	10.0%

=== 2010 census ===
As of the 2010 United States census, there were 41 people residing in Zion. The population density was 28 inhabitants per square mile (11/km^{2}). There were 15 housing units at an average density of 10/sq mi (4/km^{2}). The racial makeup of the CDP was 20.83% White, 56.25% Native American, and 22.92% from two or more races.

There were 16 households, out of which 37.5% had children under the age of 18 living with them, 56.3% were married couples living together, 12.5% had a female householder with no husband present, and 25.0% were non-families. 25.0% of all households were made up of individuals, and 18.8% had someone living alone who was 65 years of age or older. The average household size was 3.00 and the average family size was 3.58.

In the CDP, the population was spread out, with 27.1% under the age of 18, 10.4% from 18 to 24, 22.9% from 25 to 44, 25.0% from 45 to 64, and 14.6% who were 65 years of age or older. The median age was 36 years. For every 100 females, there were 140.0 males. For every 100 females age 18 and over, there were 169.2 males.

The median income for a household in the CDP was $28,250, and the median income for a family was $28,250. Males had a median income of $28,750 versus $13,750 for females. The per capita income for the CDP was $6,920. There were 18.2% of families and 15.7% of the population living below the poverty line, including 17.2% of those under 18 and 16.7% of those over 64.
