= Cherry Tree, Oklahoma =

Census-designated place in Oklahoma, USA

Cherry Tree, Oklahoma ᎩᏔᏲᎢ (Cherokee)
- CDP
- Location within Adair County and the state of Oklahoma
- Coordinates: 35°44′43″N 94°38′34″W
- Country: United States
- State: Oklahoma
- County: Adair

Area
  - Total: 11.56 sq mi (29.94 km^{2})
  - Land: 11.51 sq mi (29.80 km^{2})
  - Water: 0.054 sq mi (0.14 km^{2})
- Elevation: 1,073 ft (327 m)

Population (2020)
  - Total: 703
  - Density: 61.1/sq mi (23.59/km^{2})
- Time zone: UTC-6 (Central (CST))
  - Summer (DST): UTC-5 (CDT)
- FIPS code: 40-13775
- GNIS feature ID: 2408018

Cherry Tree is a census-designated place (CDP) in Adair County, Oklahoma, United States. As of the 2020 census, Cherry Tree had a population of 703.

== Geography ==
According to the United States Census Bureau, the CDP has a total area of 30.8 square miles (80 km^{2}), of which 30.8 square miles (80 km^{2}) is land and 0.04 square miles (0.10 km^{2}) (0.13%) is water.

== Demographics ==
Historical population
Census	Pop.	Note	%±
2000	1,202		—
2010	883		−26.5%
2020	703		−20.4%
U.S. Decennial Census

=== 2020 census ===
As of the 2020 census, Cherry Tree had a population of 703. The median age was 34.9 years. 29.6% of residents were under the age of 18 and 13.2% of residents were 65 years of age or older. For every 100 females there were 95.3 males, and for every 100 females age 18 and over there were 104.5 males age 18 and over.

0.0% of residents lived in urban areas, while 100.0% lived in rural areas.

There were 232 households in Cherry Tree, of which 43.1% had children under the age of 18 living in them. Of all households, 44.8% were married-couple households, 20.3% were households with a male householder and no spouse or partner present, and 27.6% were households with a female householder and no spouse or partner present. About 18.1% of all households were made up of individuals and 8.2% had someone living alone who was 65 years of age or older.

There were 248 housing units, of which 6.5% were vacant. The homeowner vacancy rate was 0.5% and the rental vacancy rate was 5.3%.

Racial composition as of the 2020 census
Race	Number	Percent
White	86	12.2%
Black or African American	1	0.1%
American Indian and Alaska Native	527	75.0%
Asian	0	0.0%
Native Hawaiian and Other Pacific Islander	0	0.0%
Some other race	14	2.0%
Two or more races	75	10.7%
Hispanic or Latino (of any race)	46	6.5%

=== 2000 census ===
As of the census of 2000, there were 1,202 people, 379 households, and 299 families residing in the CDP. The population density was 39.1 people per square mile (15.1 people/km^{2}). There were 421 housing units at an average density of 13.7 per square mile (5.3/km^{2}). The racial makeup of the CDP was 17.47% White, 0.08% African American, 75.37% Native American, 0.08% Asian, 0.50% from other races, and 6.49% from two or more races. Hispanic or Latino of any race were 2.50% of the population.

There were 379 households, out of which 38.5% had children under the age of 18 living with them, 57.0% were married couples living together, 17.4% had a female householder with no husband present, and 21.1% were non-families. 18.7% of all households were made up of individuals, and 5.8% had someone living alone who was 65 years of age or older. The average household size was 3.17 and the average family size was 3.64.

In the CDP, the population was spread out, with 32.3% under the age of 18, 9.6% from 18 to 24, 28.0% from 25 to 44, 22.3% from 45 to 64, and 7.8% who were 65 years of age or older. The median age was 31 years. For every 100 females, there were 100.3 males. For every 100 females age 18 and over, there were 98.1 males.

The median income for a household in the CDP was $26,438, and the median income for a family was $28,882. Males had a median income of $25,417 versus $18,295 for females. The per capita income for the CDP was $8,895. About 21.0% of families and 26.5% of the population were below the poverty line, including 37.3% of those under age 18 and 18.1% of those age 65 or over.
