= Lyons Switch, Oklahoma =

Unincorporated community in Oklahoma, US

- Census-designated place
- Location within Adair County and the state of Oklahoma
- Coordinates: 35°46′28″N 94°42′19″W
- Country: United States
- State: Oklahoma
- County: Adair

Area
  - Total: 13.06 sq mi (33.82 km^{2})
  - Land: 12.70 sq mi (32.90 km^{2})
  - Water: 0.36 sq mi (0.92 km^{2})
- Elevation: 988 ft (301 m)

Population (2020)
  - Total: 518
  - Density: 40.8/sq mi (15.74/km^{2})
- Time zone: UTC-6 (Central (CST))
  - Summer (DST): UTC-5 (CDT)
- FIPS code: 40-44775
- GNIS feature ID: 2408155

Lyons Switch is a census-designated place (CDP) in Adair County, Oklahoma, United States. As of the 2020 census, Lyons Switch had a population of 518.

== Geography ==
According to the United States Census Bureau, the CDP has a total area of 8.6 square miles (22.4 km^{2}), of which 8.3 square miles (21.6 km^{2}) is land and 0.35 square miles (0.9 km^{2}), or 3.80%, is water.

== Demographics ==
Historical population
Census	Pop.	Note	%±
2000	227		—
2010	288		26.9%
2020	518		79.9%
U.S. Decennial Census

=== 2020 census ===
As of the 2020 census, Lyons Switch had a population of 518. The median age was 45.1 years. 25.1% of residents were under the age of 18 and 19.9% of residents were 65 years of age or older. For every 100 females there were 97.0 males, and for every 100 females age 18 and over there were 96.0 males age 18 and over.

0.0% of residents lived in urban areas, while 100.0% lived in rural areas.

There were 188 households in Lyons Switch, of which 28.2% had children under the age of 18 living in them. Of all households, 52.7% were married-couple households, 12.2% were households with a male householder and no spouse or partner present, and 27.7% were households with a female householder and no spouse or partner present. About 24.4% of all households were made up of individuals and 11.7% had someone living alone who was 65 years of age or older.

There were 213 housing units, of which 11.7% were vacant. The homeowner vacancy rate was 0.0% and the rental vacancy rate was 13.8%.

Racial composition as of the 2020 census
Race	Number	Percent
White	171	33.0%
Black or African American	5	1.0%
American Indian and Alaska Native	269	51.9%
Asian	0	0.0%
Native Hawaiian and Other Pacific Islander	0	0.0%
Some other race	0	0.0%
Two or more races	73	14.1%
Hispanic or Latino (of any race)	19	3.7%

=== 2000 census ===
As of the census of 2000, there were 227 people, 90 households, and 68 families residing in the CDP. The population density was 27.4 people per square mile (10.6 people/km^{2}). There were 101 housing units at an average density of 12.2 per square mile (4.7/km^{2}). The racial makeup of the CDP was 48.02% White, 42.73% Native American, and 9.25% from two or more races. Hispanic or Latino of any race were 0.88% of the population.

There were 90 households, out of which 32.2% had children under the age of 18 living with them, 53.3% were married couples living together, 14.4% had a female householder with no husband present, and 24.4% were non-families. 23.3% of all households were made up of individuals, and 12.2% had someone living alone who was 65 years of age or older. The average household size was 2.52 and the average family size was 2.93.

In the CDP, the population was spread out, with 27.3% under the age of 18, 4.4% from 18 to 24, 23.3% from 25 to 44, 30.4% from 45 to 64, and 14.5% who were 65 years of age or older. The median age was 40 years. For every 100 females, there were 104.5 males. For every 100 females age 18 and over, there were 111.5 males.

The median income for a household in the CDP was $26,458, and the median income for a family was $31,667. Males had a median income of $26,250 versus $16,250 for females. The per capita income for the CDP was $15,148. About 6.7% of families and 11.5% of the population were below the poverty line, including 15.6% of those under the age of eighteen and 14.3% of those 65 or over.
