= Bell, Oklahoma =

Unincorporated community in Oklahoma, US

Bell
- Census-designated place
- Location within Adair County and the state of Oklahoma
- Coordinates: 35°44′12″N 94°34′04″W
- Country: United States
- State: Oklahoma
- County: Adair

Area
  - Total: 4.70 sq mi (12.18 km^{2})
  - Land: 4.70 sq mi (12.18 km^{2})
  - Water: 0.0039 sq mi (0.01 km^{2})
- Elevation: 948 ft (289 m)

Population (2020)
  - Total: 191
  - Density: 40.6/sq mi (15.69/km^{2})
- Time zone: UTC-6 (Central (CST))
  - Summer (DST): UTC-5 (CST)
- FIPS code: 40-05090
- GNIS feature ID: 2407825

Bell is a census-designated place (CDP) in Adair County, Oklahoma, United States. As of the 2020 census, Bell had a population of 191.

== Geography ==
According to the United States Census Bureau, the CDP has a total area of 22.2 square miles (57 km^{2}), all land.

== Demographics ==
Historical population
Census	Pop.	Note	%±
2000	602		—
2010	535		−11.1%
2020	191		−64.3%
U.S. Decennial Census

=== 2020 census ===
As of the 2020 census, Bell had a population of 191. The median age was 36.5 years. 27.7% of residents were under the age of 18 and 14.7% of residents were 65 years of age or older. For every 100 females there were 101.1 males, and for every 100 females age 18 and over there were 94.4 males age 18 and over.

0.0% of residents lived in urban areas, while 100.0% lived in rural areas.

There were 51 households in Bell, of which 27.5% had children under the age of 18 living in them. Of all households, 60.8% were married-couple households, 11.8% were households with a male householder and no spouse or partner present, and 25.5% were households with a female householder and no spouse or partner present. About 21.6% of all households were made up of individuals and 11.8% had someone living alone who was 65 years of age or older.

There were 58 housing units, of which 12.1% were vacant. The homeowner vacancy rate was 0.0% and the rental vacancy rate was 15.8%.

Racial composition as of the 2020 census
Race	Number	Percent
White	31	16.2%
Black or African American	0	0.0%
American Indian and Alaska Native	142	74.3%
Asian	0	0.0%
Native Hawaiian and Other Pacific Islander	0	0.0%
Some other race	0	0.0%
Two or more races	18	9.4%
Hispanic or Latino (of any race)	9	4.7%

=== 2000 census ===
As of the census of 2000, there were 602 people, 181 households, and 152 families residing in the CDP. The population density was 27.1 inhabitants per square mile (10.5/km^{2}). There were 189 housing units at an average density of 8.5 units per square mile (3.3 units/km^{2}). The racial makeup of the CDP was 35.71% White, 0.33% African American, 57.81% Native American, 0.17% from other races, and 5.98% from two or more races. Hispanic or Latino of any race were 0.66% of the population.

There were 181 households, out of which 38.1% had children under the age of 18 living with them, 63.5% were married couples living together, 13.8% had a female householder with no husband present, and 15.5% were non-families. 13.8% of all households were made up of individuals, and 7.2% had someone living alone who was 65 years of age or older. The average household size was 3.33 and the average family size was 3.69.

In the CDP, the population was spread out, with 31.6% under the age of 18, 11.8% from 18 to 24, 26.9% from 25 to 44, 18.6% from 45 to 64, and 11.1% who were 65 years of age or older. The median age was 30 years. For every 100 females, there were 102.0 males. For every 100 females age 18 and over, there were 103.0 males.

The median income for a household in the CDP was $20,000, and the median income for a family was $23,482. Males had a median income of $20,450 versus $14,750 for females. The per capita income for the CDP was $8,753. About 30.5% of families and 35.1% of the population were below the poverty line, including 44.8% of those under age 18 and 37.1% of those age 65 or over.

== Bell waterline project ==
In the early 1980s, the Cherokee Nation, under the direction of Wilma Mankiller (then the director of the Cherokee Nation Community Development Department, later principal chief) and her colleague (and future husband) Charlie Soap, put together a project to build a 16-mile waterline to Bell, where many of the residents still had no indoor plumbing. The tribe provided equipment and technological assistance, while Bell residents contributed most of the labor on a volunteer basis. The project drew widespread attention and launched Mankiller's political career. The project is the subject of a 2013 feature film, The Cherokee Word for Water.

== Education ==
Most of Bell is in the Stilwell Public Schools school district while a part is in the Belfonte Public School school district.

It was formerly in the Bell Public School school district. In June 2010, after systemic auditing by the Oklahoma state Board of Education, the 200-year-old school district was demanded to be closed by the state. This was due to declared financial impropriety discovered during the auditing process. The Kindergarten through Eighth grade district, composed 97% by Cherokee children, was merged with two separate district. The Stilwell and Belfonte school districts were to fiscal responsibility for the students from the Bell district, and the former Bell school building was to remain open.

== External sources ==
- Voices of Oklahoma interview with Wilma Mankiller. First person interview conducted on August 13, 2009, with Wilma Mankiller, creator of the Bell Water Project.
