= List of United States tornadoes from November to December 2018 =

United States tornadoes from November to December 2018
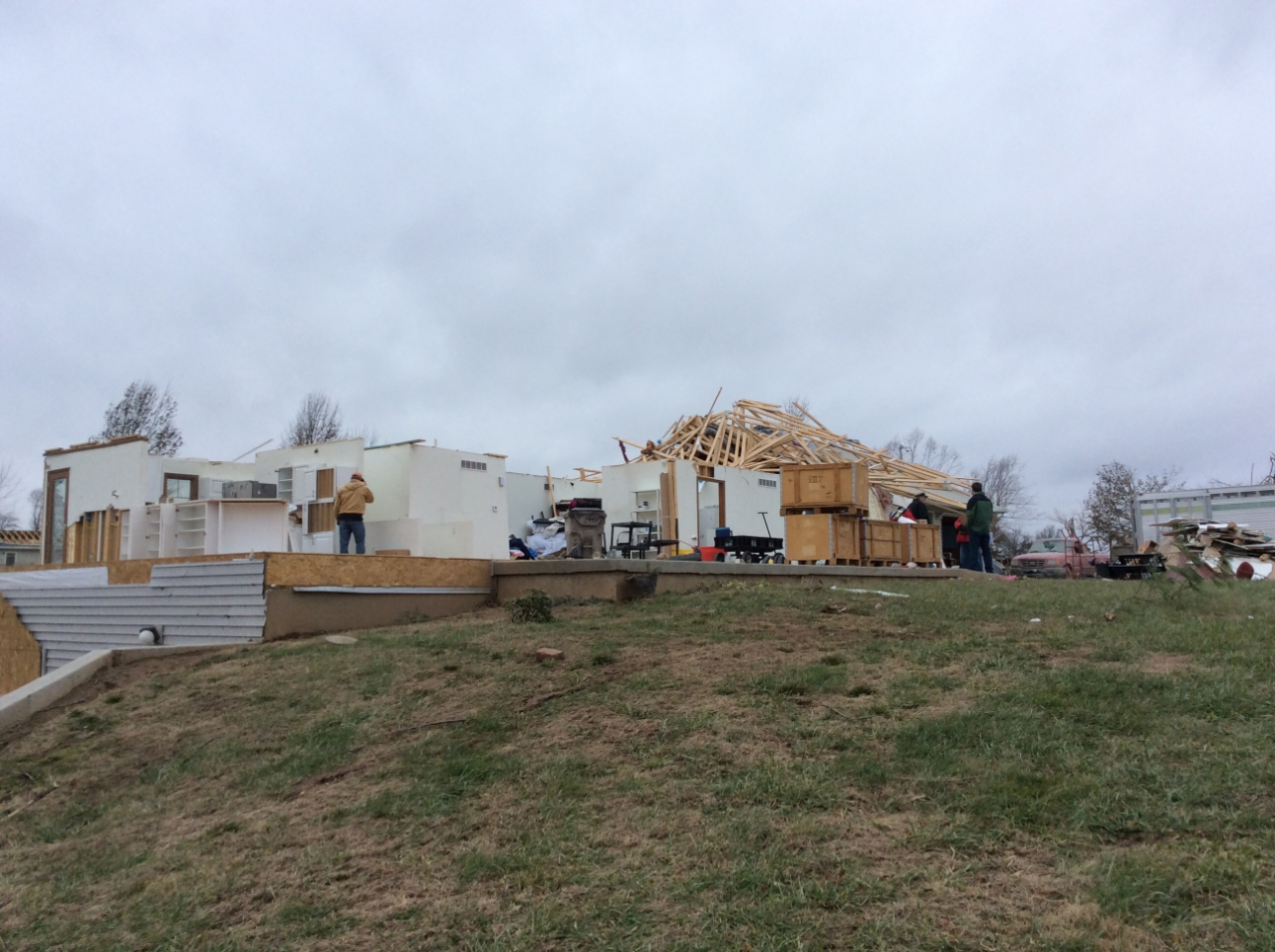
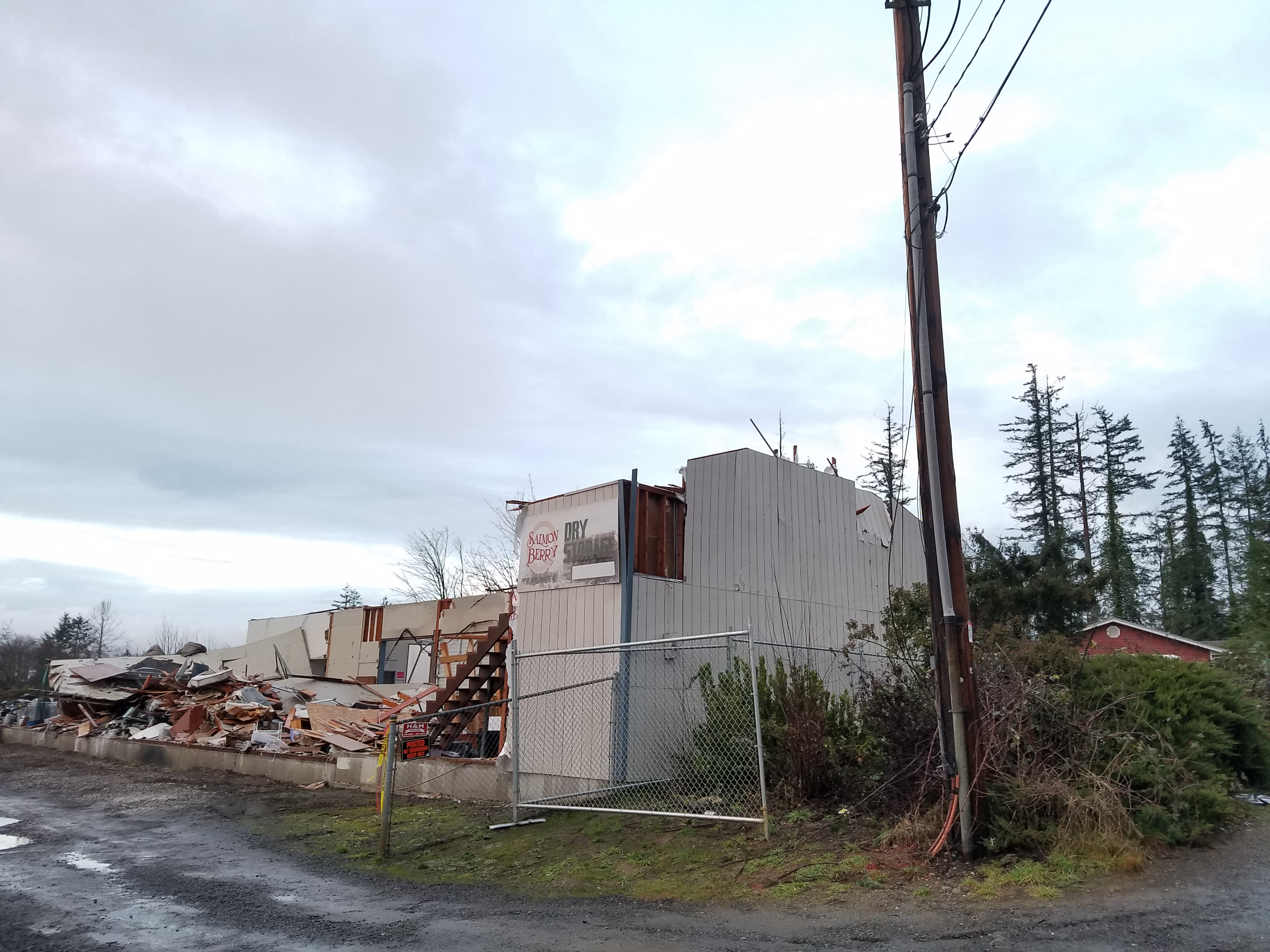
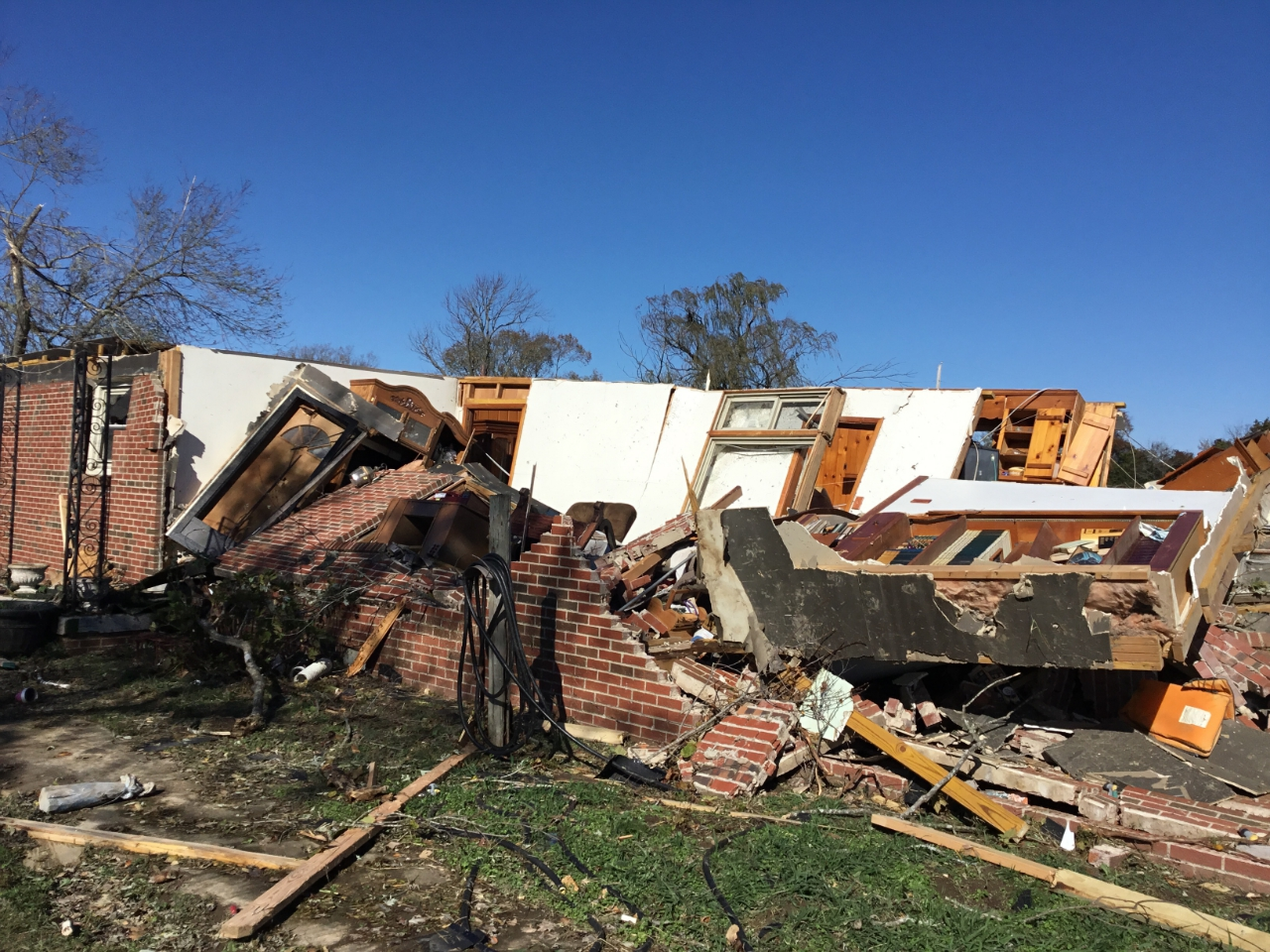
- Clockwise from top: A large home following an EF3 tornado that struck Taylorville, Illinois on December 1; A warehouse in Port Orchard, Washington after a rare EF2 tornado on December 18; High-end EF2 damage to a home west of Midland, Tennessee after a tornado hit on November 6.
- Timespan: November 1 – December 31
- Maximum rated tornado: EF3 tornado: Taylorville, Illinois on December 1; Kings Bay Base, Georgia on December 2
- Tornadoes: 154
- Fatalities: 4
- Injuries: 42

This page documents all tornadoes confirmed by various weather forecast offices of the National Weather Service in the United States during November to December 2018. Based on the 1991–2010 averaging period, 58 tornadoes occur across the United States throughout November while 24 more occur in December.

November saw multiple large outbreaks, the first of which was an extension of an outbreak that began at the end of October while the last one extended into December. December also featured an unusually strong tornado in the state of Washington. November and December finished significantly above average with 88 and 66 tornadoes respectively. However, both months did not have any violent tornadoes, leaving the United States without any tornadoes of such intensity for all of 2018.

== United States yearly total ==
Confirmed tornadoes by Enhanced Fujita rating
EFU	EF0	EF1	EF2	EF3	EF4	EF5	Total
15	619	399	76	12	0	0	1,121

== November ==
Confirmed tornadoes by Enhanced Fujita rating
EFU	EF0	EF1	EF2	EF3	EF4	EF5	Total
0	27	46	15	0	0	0	88

=== November 1 event ===
List of confirmed tornadoes – Thursday, November 1, 2018 (Note: All dates are based on the local time zone where the tornado touched down; however, all times are in Coordinated Universal Time for consistency.)
EF#	Location	County / Parish	State	Start Coord.	Time (UTC)	Path length	Max width
EF1	W of Glenmora	Rapides	LA	30.9198°N 92.7315°W	05:10–05:21	9.49 mi (15.27 km)	300 yd (270 m)
EF1	Several trees were snapped or uprooted.						
EF1	S of Lake Charles	Calcasieu	LA	30.1755°N 93.2231°W	05:15–05:17	0.52 mi (0.84 km)	126 yd (115 m)
EF1	Trees, roofs, carports, and an old Kroger store suffered damage.						
EF0	NE of Hackberry	Cameron	LA	30.0456°N 93.2328°W	05:16–05:17	0.15 mi (0.24 km)	50 yd (46 m)
EF0	One home and some tree branches were damaged.						
EF2	E of Oakdale	Allen, Evangeline	LA	30.7914°N 92.6606°W	05:17–05:33	13.27 mi (21.36 km)	900 yd (820 m)
EF2	Numerous trees, power lines, and power poles were snapped or downed by this strong tornado.						
EF1	NNW of Glenmora	Rapides	LA	30.9883°N 92.6279°W	05:22–05:25	3.34 mi (5.38 km)	600 yd (550 m)
EF1	Numerous trees and power lines were downed.						
EF1	Southern Alexandria	Rapides	LA	31.1978°N 92.5798°W	05:25–05:38	9.17 mi (14.76 km)	50 yd (46 m)
EF1	Several trees were snapped.						
EF1	SSW of Iowa	Calcasieu	LA	30.1758°N 93.0467°W	05:30–05:32	0.98 mi (1.58 km)	75 yd (69 m)
EF1	Two outbuildings were damaged.						
EF2	SE of Cheneyville to NE of Hessmer	Rapides, Avoyelles	LA	30.9874°N 92.2640°W	05:50–06:06	13.47 mi (21.68 km)	800 yd (730 m)
EF2	Several power poles were snapped, many trees and power lines were downed, and several homes sustained damage to their roofs. One home in particular was severely damaged, with many steel beams bent, a large roll-up door blown in, and its outside AC unit tossed into the garage.						
EF1	NE of Marksville	Avoyelles, Catahoula	LA	31.1468°N 91.9918°W	06:13–06:33	12.58 mi (20.25 km)	350 yd (320 m)
EF1	Numerous trees were snapped or downed, including one that landed on an RV.						
EF1	S of Jonesville	Catahoula, Concordia	LA	31.5684°N 91.8666°W	06:24–06:36	10.08 mi (16.22 km)	900 yd (820 m)
EF1	Numerous trees and a couple of wooden power poles were snapped. Two mobile homes suffered significant damage, with one being shifted off its foundation and the other being lifted up and rolled onto its side. One person was injured as a result. Other houses suffered minor roof damage, and sheds were severely damaged.						
EF1	NE of Larto	Concordia, Catahoula	LA	31.4765°N 91.8339°W	06:30–06:32	1.05 mi (1.69 km)	150 yd (140 m)
EF1	A few trees were snapped or uprooted, and a single family home had damage to its roof.						
EF1	N of Sibley	Adams	MS	31.4301°N 91.4156°W	07:04–07:11	4.98 mi (8.01 km)	250 yd (230 m)
EF1	A few trees were snapped or uprooted, and a single family home had damage to its roof.						
EF2	Morgantown	Adams	MS	31.5698°N 91.3664°W	07:09–07:10	0.99 mi (1.59 km)	200 yd (180 m)
EF2	One home lost over half its roof and several others suffered more minor damage. Power lines were downed, power poles were snapped, and trees were damaged.						
EF1	Northern Port Gibson	Claiborne	MS	31.9634°N 90.9845°W	07:30–07:32	1.06 mi (1.71 km)	200 yd (180 m)
EF1	Minor to moderate structural damage was observed at the north edge of Port Gibson, including an abandoned drive-in restaurant that sustained damage. Otherwise, damage was limited to snapped trees, one of which fell onto a metal carport.						
EF1	N of Port Gibson	Claiborne	MS	32.0140°N 90.9729°W	07:31–07:36	3.53 mi (5.68 km)	200 yd (180 m)
EF1	Numerous trees were snapped or uprooted. The tornado resulted in one indirect death: a motorist was killed when their vehicle ran into a falling tree.						
EF1	SE of Roxie to N of Bude	Franklin	MS	31.4642°N 91.0279°W	07:39–08:01	13.6 mi (21.9 km)	400 yd (370 m)
EF1	A mobile home was blown off its blocks, and many trees were damaged.						
EF0	W of Bolton	Hinds	MS	32.3645°N 90.5309°W	08:00–08:02	0.84 mi (1.35 km)	150 yd (140 m)
EF0	The metal roof was blown off an outbuilding, and large tree limbs were downed.						
EF1	N of Bentonia	Yazoo	MS	32.6983°N 90.3830°W	08:03–08:09	3.95 mi (6.36 km)	560 yd (510 m)
EF1	Several trees were snapped or uprooted. Minor damage occurred to a few businesses and a church.						
EF1	NW of McCall Creek	Franklin	MS	31.5743°N 90.7382°W	08:10–08:14	2.99 mi (4.81 km)	500 yd (460 m)
EF1	Several trees were snapped or uprooted; one fallen tree partially destroyed a chicken coop.						
EF0	S of Crystal Springs	Copiah	MS	31.9408°N 90.3438°W	08:29–08:32	2.19 mi (3.52 km)	200 yd (180 m)
EF0	Several trees were snapped or uprooted, including one that fell onto a home.						
EF1	WNW of Ridgeland	Madison	MS	32.4399°N 90.1998°W	08:33–08:35	1.28 mi (2.06 km)	300 yd (270 m)
EF1	A few dozen trees were snapped or uprooted.						
EF2	SW of Bogalusa	Washington	LA	30.7601°N 89.9292°W	08:35–08:42	2.25 mi (3.62 km)	200 yd (180 m)
EF2	Numerous trees were snapped or uprooted. A single-family home had a large portion of its roof ripped off and one of its exterior walls blown in. Several mobile homes were heavily damaged, one of which was rolled, injuring two occupants.						
EF1	SW of Kentwood	Tangipahoa	LA	30.9236°N 90.5264°W	08:37–08:40	0.61 mi (0.98 km)	50 yd (46 m)
EF1	Numerous tree limbs were snapped and several trees were uprooted, including one that fell onto and destroyed a mobile home. A few residences had their shingles ripped off.						
EF0	ENE of Florence	Rankin	MS	32.1814°N 90.0728°W	08:53–08:57	2.84 mi (4.57 km)	200 yd (180 m)
EF0	Large tree limbs were downed.						
EF2	NNW of Varnado	Washington	LA	30.9257°N 89.8464°W	08:54–08:55	0.66 mi (1.06 km)	200 yd (180 m)
EF2	A metal outbuilding was obliterated, with debris left scattered in nearby trees. Several camper trailers were rolled, a single-family home lost a portion of its roof and suffered damage to its porch, and many trees were snapped or uprooted.						
EF1	S of Hammond	Tangipahoa	LA	30.4689°N 90.4614°W	08:57–08:59	0.51 mi (0.82 km)	75 yd (69 m)
EF1	Minor damage occurred to a hotel and small office building, including a few windows that were blown out of the former structure. A small professional building had some of its roof decking ripped off and multiple dormers ripped or damaged. Multiple trees were snapped.						
EF0	SW of Calhoun City	Calhoun	MS	33.798°N 89.3431°W	09:13–09:14	0.39 mi (0.63 km)	75 yd (69 m)
EF0	Several trees were snapped or uprooted. The roof of a barn and several storage sheds were damaged.						
EF1	NNE of Morton	Scott	MS	32.4468°N 89.6966°W	09:20–09:32	9.41 mi (15.14 km)	550 yd (500 m)
EF1	Numerous trees were snapped or uprooted.						
EF0	W of Convington	St. Tammany	LA	30.4745°N 90.1594°W	09:23–09:24	0.29 mi (0.47 km)	30 yd (27 m)
EF0	Several trees were snapped, multiple fences and mailboxes were knocked over, and a few homes sustained shingle loss.						
EF1	Polkville	Rankin, Smith	MS	32.1639°N 89.7366°W	09:29–09:34	4.5 mi (7.2 km)	300 yd (270 m)
EF1	Numerous trees were snapped or uprooted in Polkville. One tree limb fell on and damaged the roof of a mobile home. A metal shed had its roof ripped off as well.						
EF1	NE of Raleigh	Smith, Scott	MS	32.2155°N 89.3714°W	10:01–10:06	4.01 mi (6.45 km)	150 yd (140 m)
EF1	Numerous trees were snapped or uprooted.						
EF0	SE of Louisville	Winston	MS	33.0499°N 88.8877°W	10:22–10:25	2.03 mi (3.27 km)	75 yd (69 m)
EF0	Trees were uprooted while both an outbuilding and the roof and front exterior of a home were damaged.						
EF1	E of Success	Harrison	MS	30.5439°N 89.0298°W	10:53–11:00	7.22 mi (11.62 km)	150 yd (140 m)
EF1	Trees and road signs were snapped or downed.						
EF0	N of Red Bay	Franklin	AL	34.54°N 88.14°W	11:05–11:10	1.95 mi (3.14 km)	90 yd (82 m)
EF0	A couple of trees were snapped and uprooted.						
EF1	Eastern Ocean Springs	Jackson	MS	30.4033°N 88.7826°W	11:24–11:28	3.21 mi (5.17 km)	100 yd (91 m)
EF1	Two wooden power poles and three small traffic warning lights were downed. Several cars were damaged, seven windows were broken at a Wal-Mart, and trees were snapped or uprooted. Homes suffered minor damage to their shingles and fascia.						
EF1	Escatawpa to Helena	Jackson	MS	30.4744°N 88.5583°W	11:40–11:45	4.08 mi (6.57 km)	100 yd (91 m)
EF1	In Escatawpa, a church and several homes sustained considerable roof, siding, and fascia damage. Additional minor damage to homes occurred in Helena before the tornado dissipated. Numerous trees and tree limbs were snapped along the path						
EF1	SE of Gilbertown	Choctaw	AL	31.8361°N 88.2647°W	12:08–12:09	0.83 mi (1.34 km)	100 yd (91 m)
EF1	Five houses, three barns, and numerous trees were damaged, although a majority of this damage was due to straight-line winds. In November 2023, this tornado was reanalyzed and was upgraded from an EF0 to an EF1 based on numerous snapped and uprooted trees noted on Planet satellite imagery. The tornado had its path length extended from 0.14 mi (0.23 km) to 0.83 mi (1.34 km).						
EF0	NNW of Beans Mill	Chambers, Lee	AL	32.739°N 85.2892°W	17:12–17:16	2.65 mi (4.26 km)	50 yd (46 m)
EF0	A manufacturing plant sustained minor damage to its roof and rooftop air conditioning unit, and loose lightweight debris was scattered at another plant nearby. A fireworks store sustained facade damage, and a tin overhang attached to a mobile home was completely removed and blown downwind. A few trees were downed as well.						
EF0	S of Iberia	Miller	MO	38.06°N 92.29°W	22:25–22:26	0.03 mi (0.048 km)	20 yd (18 m)
EF0	This brief landspout tornado snapped a tree and several tree limbs.						

=== November 2 event ===
List of confirmed tornadoes – Friday, November 2, 2018
EF#	Location	County / Parish	State	Start Coord.	Time (UTC)	Path length	Max width
EF1	Seminole	Pinellas	FL	27.8327°N 82.7898°W	19:13–19:16	1.7 mi (2.7 km)	75 yd (69 m)
EF1	Two mobile home parks suffered widespread damage, a condominium roof was ripped off, and numerous trees were downed. One person was injured.						
EF1	New Port Richey	Pasco	FL	28.2065°N 82.6534°W	19:17–19:18	0.27 mi (0.43 km)	50 yd (46 m)
EF1	Seven homes were damaged, one significantly. Numerous trees were downed as well.						
EF1	Spring Hill	Hernando	FL	28.4683°N 82.566°W	19:22–19:24	0.71 mi (1.14 km)	100 yd (91 m)
EF1	Seventeen homes were damaged, two of which sustained major roof damage. Various trees and power lines were also destroyed as well.						
EF1	N of Land o' Lakes	Pasco	FL	28.333°N 82.47°W	19:24–19:25	0.78 mi (1.26 km)	125 yd (114 m)
EF1	Half the roof of a barn was destroyed.						
EF1	Land o' Lakes	Pasco	FL	28.2087°N 82.4553°W	20:22–20:24	1.21 mi (1.95 km)	75 yd (69 m)
EF1	Two homes sustained considerable roof damage, and numerous trees and tree limbs were downed. One tree fell through a house, splitting the structure in half.						
EF2	ESE of Crystal Hill	Halifax	VA	36.8222°N 78.8417°W	23:14–23:17	1.74 mi (2.80 km)	300 yd (270 m)
EF2	A house had its roof torn off, and two other homes sustained significant roof damage. Large hay bales were thrown up to 100 ft (30 m) from where they originated, and the roof was blown off of a barn. Large trees were uprooted, snapped, or completely denuded along the path.						
EF2	Eastern Mount Airy	Howard, Carroll	MD	39.3479°N 77.1713°W	00:19–00:26	5.45 mi (8.77 km)	400 yd (370 m)
EF2	A tornado began in Howard County, snapping several wooden power poles. It progressed into Carroll County, mainly downing numerous trees until it entered the eastern sections of Mt. Airy. There, a gas station canopy was uplifted and partially removed, several outbuildings were severely damaged or destroyed, and several power poles were snapped. Some trees showed indications of being debarked, consistent with an EF2 tornado. Several homes suffered roof and shingle damage or removal. Several greenhouses were destroyed and water was completely removed from a nearby pond. A home weather station recorded a maximum wind gust of 112 mph (180 km/h).						
EF1	SE of Canton to Dundalk	Baltimore City, Baltimore	MD	39.2700°N 76.5552°W	01:42–01:45	2.72 mi (4.38 km)	150 yd (140 m)
EF1	2 deaths – A tornado touched down on the southeast side of Baltimore near Canton, overturning a tractor trailer, flattening a fence, and blowing in the large garage doors on both sides of a van leasing facility. At an Amazon sorting facility, a portion of the building lost its roof, resulting in the concrete wall panels being pushed in and collapsed into the building. Two deaths occurred as a result of the collapsed walls. About a dozen truck trailers were overturned or rolled, and several light stanchions and signs were blown over. Several cars had their windows blown out by flying debris. Numerous trees were snapped or uprooted as well.						

=== November 5 event ===
List of confirmed tornadoes – Monday, November 5, 2018
EF#	Location	County / Parish	State	Start Coord.	Time (UTC)	Path length	Max width
EF1	N of Natchez	Natchitoches	LA	31.6959°N 93.0509°W	22:11–22:14	1.74 mi (2.80 km)	200 yd (180 m)
EF1	This tornado caused considerable roof damage to homes, snapped numerous trees, destroyed a small boathouse, and damaged two others. A mobile home sustained minor damage, and a detached garage had its metal garage door blown in as well.						
EF1	E of Saint Maurice	Winn	LA	31.7489°N 92.9362°W	22:24–22:25	3.08 mi (4.96 km)	50 yd (46 m)
EF1	Approximately 25 trees were snapped or uprooted.						
EF2	NW of Marthaville	Sabine, Natchitoches	LA	31.7434°N 93.4507°W	22:44–22:53	5.85 mi (9.41 km)	475 yd (434 m)
EF2	A house had much of its roof torn off, another home lost a large section of its metal roof, and many trees and power poles were snapped. Several other homes sustained minor damage, and a camping trailer was pushed 5 feet off its foundation.						
EF1	SW of Atlanta	Winn	LA	31.8582°N 92.7032°W	22:50–22:51	0.42 mi (0.68 km)	50 yd (46 m)
EF1	Approximately 50 trees were snapped along the path of this tornado.						
EF1	NE of Winnfield to W of Calvin	Winn	LA	31.9336°N 92.5819°W	23:09–23:11	3.11 mi (5.01 km)	100 yd (91 m)
EF1	Approximately 20 to 25 trees were snapped along the path of this tornado.						
EF2	NW of Clarence to W of Calvin	Natchitoches, Winn	LA	31.8563°N 93.0949°W	23:25–23:59	19.65 mi (31.62 km)	400 yd (370 m)
EF2	Numerous trees and two power poles were snapped, a large vehicle trailer was flipped, and a travel trailer was thrown 30 yd (27 m). A manufactured home sustained damage to its roof, partially from trees that landed on the structure. Tree limbs were snapped just outside of Calvin before the tornado dissipated.						
EF1	SW of Sikes	Winn	LA	32.0204°N 92.4172°W	23:30–23:31	1.17 mi (1.88 km)	300 yd (270 m)
EF1	Numerous trees were snapped or uprooted along the path.						
EF1	NW of Bienville	Bienville	LA	32.385°N 93.0421°W	23:35–23:43	4.12 mi (6.63 km)	75 yd (69 m)
EF1	Numerous trees were snapped or uprooted along the path.						
EF0	SSE of Crestview	Okaloosa	FL	30.6831°N 86.5678°W	00:15–00:16	0.01 mi (0.016 km)	10 yd (9.1 m)
EF0	A food services building and a perimeter fence were damaged at the Okaloosa Correctional Facility.						
EF0	SE of Brownsville	Edmonson	KY	37.1589°N 86.1549°W	03:53	0.3 mi (0.48 km)	65 yd (59 m)
EF0	Several trees were snapped or uprooted.						
EF0	NNE of New Market	Marion	KY	37.5249°N 85.3045°W	04:40–04:42	2 mi (3.2 km)	60 yd (55 m)
EF0	An old barn was destroyed, several small trees were snapped, and a small TV tower next to a house was toppled over.						
EF1	N of Columbia	Adair	KY	37.1787°N 85.3239°W	04:52–04:56	3.8 mi (6.1 km)	150 yd (140 m)
EF1	Several barns and outbuildings were damaged or destroyed, and a 1,500-pound (680.4 kg) hay roll was tossed over a fence. Debris from affected structures was scattered up to a quarter-mile away, some of which damaged other buildings and vehicles. Two small grain hoppers were destroyed, and a house had its porch columns blown off.						
EF2	Tupelo	Pontotoc, Lee	MS	34.2601°N 88.8283°W	04:58–05:10	10.39 mi (16.72 km)	200 yd (180 m)
EF2	This strong tornado caused significant structural damage in Tupelo, where two homes had their roofs torn off, one of which sustained collapse of exterior walls. Several other homes and an assisted living facility had large sections of their roofs ripped off. A business sustained partial roof removal, and several hotels, restaurants, and homes sustained minor damage. Many trees were snapped or uprooted along the path, and power poles were damaged. One person was injured.						
EF0	SSE of Centerville	Hickman	TN	35.7143°N 87.4431°W	05:00–05:07	3.74 mi (6.02 km)	50 yd (46 m)
EF0	A barn was destroyed, two other barns lost parts of tin roofing, and many trees were downed.						
EF0	NNW of Mount Pleasant	Hickman, Maury	TN	35.7051°N 87.2589°W	05:09–05:12	2.1 mi (3.4 km)	75 yd (69 m)
EF0	Large trees were damaged or uprooted along the Natchez Trace Parkway. Additionally, several 2,000 lb (910 kg) hay bales were rolled into a fence line and tin roofing was peeled from the front porch of a house.						
EF1	NW of Cloverdale, AL to W of Iron City, TN	Lauderdale (AL), Wayne (TN)	AL, TN	34.9770°N 87.8094°W	05:16–05:24	6.31 mi (10.15 km)	200 yd (180 m)
EF1	A house had an exterior wall blown off, and numerous other homes sustained roof damage and broken windows. A barn, brick carport, and an outbuilding were destroyed, and many trees were snapped or uprooted. Several large bales of hay were rolled through a field, and RV campers were overturned as well.						
EF1	S of Kirkville	Itawamba	MS	34.4039°N 88.5193°W	05:19–05:27	5.1 mi (8.2 km)	300 yd (270 m)
EF1	A metal garage sustained substantial damage, several mobile homes received minor damage, and many trees were downed.						
EF1	N of St. Joseph to Loretto	Lawrence	TN	35.0519°N 87.5054°W	05:41–05:46	4.12 mi (6.63 km)	300 yd (270 m)
EF1	Near St. Joseph, three homes sustained minor damage, two hay barns were destroyed, and a mobile home was rolled over. In Loretto, a sports complex at South Lawrence Elementary School sustained considerable damage, where three cinder block dugouts were destroyed, two large sections of bleachers were tossed 30 yd (27 m), and there was minor roof damage to the concession stand and an outbuilding. Several homes in town were damaged by falling trees, a large outbuilding had minor roof damage, and power lines were downed as well.						
EF0	SW of Minor Hill	Lawrence	TN	35.0121°N 87.2963°W	05:55–05:58	1.88 mi (3.03 km)	150 yd (140 m)
EF0	A home and several chicken barns were damaged, and several outbuildings were destroyed. Numerous trees were downed as well.						

=== November 6 event ===
List of confirmed tornadoes – Tuesday, November 6, 2018
EF#	Location	County / Parish	State	Start Coord.	Time (UTC)	Path length	Max width
EF2	SE of Eagleville to Southern Christiana	Bedford, Rutherford	TN	35.6504°N 86.5305°W	06:16–06:28	8.45 mi (13.60 km)	200 yd (180 m)
EF2	1 death – Several homes sustained roof and exterior wall loss, with a new but poorly anchored 3,000 ft^{2} (280 m^{2}) home being flipped completely upside-down, killing an occupant. Another home, a three-story Antebellum-style home built in the 1800s, had its roof and third floor removed. Multiple other homes sustained minor to moderate damage. Two 70 ft (21 m) silos were completely destroyed, and numerous outbuildings, sheds, barns, and garages were damaged or destroyed, with a few being completely swept away. The tornado caused minor tree and roof damage at the south edge of Christiana before dissipating. Numerous trees were snapped, denuded, and uprooted, and power lines were downed. Two people were injured in a mobile home that was completely destroyed near the end of the path, and a third injury occurred in a small brick house that lost its roof and several walls.						
EF0	WSW of Littleville	Colbert	AL	34.5717°N 87.7332°W	08:18–06:21	1.18 mi (1.90 km)	75 yd (69 m)
EF0	Trees were downed.						
EF1	ESE of Auburntown to SSE of Dowelltown	Cannon, DeKalb	TN	35.937°N 86.077°W	06:51–07:02	8.72 mi (14.03 km)	350 yd (320 m)
EF1	A house sustained considerable roof and siding damage, and a barn was destroyed with debris scattered 200 yd (180 m) across a hillside. A carport, garage, and outbuilding were destroyed, and a few other outbuildings were damaged. A church had part of its steeple blown off, and many trees were downed sporadically along the path.						
EF2	E of Winchester to NE of Pelham	Franklin, Coffee, Grundy	TN	35.2078°N 86.2074°W	07:16–07:54	40.59 mi (65.32 km)	500 yd (460 m)
EF2	This long-tracked, high-end EF2 tornado touched down on the south side of Tims Ford Lake, knocking down trees as it crossed the lake into the Eastbrook community. As the tornado crossed Highway 127 east of Estill Springs, numerous homes, mobile homes, barns, silos, and grain bins were either heavily damaged or completely destroyed, and large trees were snapped and denuded. One small brick home sustained collapse of its exterior walls, other homes had their roofs torn off, and numerous well-built metal buildings were destroyed at a nursery business. A small and unanchored home was swept clean from its cinder-block foundation in this area as well. Crossing into Coffee County, a manufactured home was damaged and a house had its porch torn off, barns and outbuildings were damaged or destroyed, and tractor-trailers were blown over on Interstate 24, causing an accident. In Grundy County, the tornado passed north of Pelham, where the roof was ripped completely off of a brick home along Highway 50, and a house under construction was left with only interior rooms standing. Power poles were snapped, and many outbuildings were damaged or destroyed. Possibly as many as 2,000 trees were either snapped or uprooted across Grundy County across hills and hollows before the tornado dissipated just before crossing into Sequatchie County.						
EF0	S of Tibbee	Oktibbeha, Lowndes	MS	33.4802°N 88.6895°W	07:24–07:34	6.58 mi (10.59 km)	100 yd (91 m)
EF0	A few trees were downed, and tree limbs were snapped. In the Mayhew area, highway signs were damaged on U.S. Route 82, and a few structures sustained shingle damage as well.						
EF0	S of Cookeville	White	TN	36.0506°N 85.5558°W	07:29–07:34	4.02 mi (6.47 km)	150 yd (140 m)
EF0	A barn was destroyed, containers and a trailer were overturned at Upper Cumberland Regional Airport, the metal roof of an outbuilding sustained damage, and many trees were downed, one of which fell on a barn.						
EF1	ESE of Millport	Lamar	AL	33.5583°N 88.0453°W	08:17–08:19	1.01 mi (1.63 km)	115 yd (105 m)
EF1	Numerous trees were downed, including a dozen large pines, and tree limbs were twisted or broken.						
EF1	E of Woodville to WSW of Scottsboro	Jackson	AL	34.6173°N 86.1696°W	08:35–08:46	3.88 mi (6.24 km)	215 yd (197 m)
EF1	Intermittent tornado in the Aspel area destroyed a shed, overturned a large horse trailer, and downed many trees.						

=== November 7 event ===
List of confirmed tornadoes – Wednesday, November 7, 2018
EF#	Location	County / Parish	State	Start Coord.	Time (UTC)	Path length	Max width
EF0	SW of China	Jefferson	TX	30.02°N 94.34°W	20:00–20:01	0.17 mi (0.27 km)	50 yd (46 m)
EF0	Pictures from social media documented a brief landspout tornado over a rice field.						
EF0	S of Macon	Bibb	GA	32.7181°N 83.7589°W	22:35–22:45	7.59 mi (12.21 km)	200 yd (180 m)
EF0	Several large trees were snapped, one of which struck a home. A church saw a portion of its metal roof blown off and tossed over 100 yd (91 m) while a covered walkway anchored in the ground with concrete footings was pulled from the ground.						

=== November 12 event ===
List of confirmed tornadoes – Wednesday, November 12, 2018
EF#	Location	County / Parish	State	Start Coord.	Time (UTC)	Path length	Max width
EF0	W of Navarre	Santa Rosa	FL	30.3984°N 86.9991°W	17:33–17:34	0.3 mi (0.48 km)	80 yd (73 m)
EF0	Several trees were bent or uprooted. Two vehicles had their windows shattered, and several signs were leaning or knocked to the ground.						

=== November 13 event ===
List of confirmed tornadoes – Thursday, November 13, 2018
EF#	Location	County / Parish	State	Start Coord.	Time (UTC)	Path length	Max width
EF1	ESE of Morehead City	Carteret	NC	34.6963°N 76.7163°W	09:45–09:47	2 mi (3.2 km)	150 yd (140 m)
EF1	Numerous sheds were destroyed. Other structures, as well as trees and signs, were damaged.						

=== November 24 event ===
List of confirmed tornadoes – Saturday, November 24, 2018
EF#	Location	County / Parish	State	Start Coord.	Time (UTC)	Path length	Max width
EF0	Cape Carteret	Carteret	NC	34.6867°N 77.0456°W	19:06–19:07	0.35 mi (0.56 km)	70 yd (64 m)
EF0	One home had minor uplift of its porch and damage to its siding. Some shingles were blown off a new roof. Large tree limbs were downed.						
EF2	Emerald Isle	Carteret	NC	34.6809°N 76.9226°W	19:10–19:16	2.8 mi (4.5 km)	75 yd (69 m)
EF2	A strong tornado damaged numerous homes, with the most heavily damaged structure losing most of its roof. A large work trailer was overturned, some trampolines were blown into trees, and a boat dock was damaged.						
EF0	Newport	Carteret	NC	34.7797°N 76.7349°W	19:40–19:41	0.5 mi (0.80 km)	40 yd (37 m)
EF0	A waterspout moved onshore at an oyster farm, tossing crab pots, damaging trees, and disturbing light outdoor materials such as gas cans and furniture.						

=== November 30 event ===
List of confirmed tornadoes – Friday, November 30, 2018
EF#	Location	County / Parish	State	Start Coord.	Time (UTC)	Path length	Max width	Summary
EF0	Tishomingo	Johnston	OK	34.2278°N 96.6806°W	02:58–02:59	0.9 mi (1.4 km)	60 yd (55 m)	Roof and tree damage occurred, including to an elementary school.
EF1	SE of Webbers Falls	Muskogee, Sequoyah	OK	35.4606°N 95.1130°W	03:28–03:37	7.1 mi (11.4 km)	400 yd (370 m)	Several center irrigation systems were destroyed, barns were damaged, and trees were snapped.
EF0	SW of Skiatook	Osage	OK	36.3141°N 96.0409°W	03:36–03:38	1.5 mi (2.4 km)	200 yd (180 m)	Two mobile homes were severely damaged, a home sustained roof damage, a barn was damaged, and tree limbs were snapped.
EF2	Blackgum to E of Proctor to SE of Colcord	Sequoyah, Cherokee, Adair, Delaware	OK	35.6064°N 94.9933°W	03:43–04:46	47 mi (76 km)	1,100 yd (1,000 m)	See section on this tornado - Five people were injured.
EF2	Northwestern Van Buren to NE of Rena	Crawford	AR	35.4601°N 94.3993°W	05:09–05:14	5.6 mi (9.0 km)	600 yd (550 m)	This strong tornado touched down in residential areas of Van Buren and damaged numerous homes, a few of which had their roofs torn off and sustained loss of some exterior walls. Pieces of lumber were speared through the exterior walls of neighboring homes. Multiple wooden double-pole utility structures were snapped off at the base, many trees were snapped or uprooted, and a pickup truck was overturned. Several apartment complexes also sustained roof damage. Additional trees were downed just north of Rena and further along the path before the tornado dissipated.
EF1	N of Rudy	Crawford	AR	35.5320°N 94.2691°W	05:17–05:24	8.7 mi (14.0 km)	700 yd (640 m)	Barns were destroyed, power poles were damaged, and numerous trees were snapped or uprooted. A house sustained minor damage.
EF0	N of Magazine	Logan	AR	35.1929°N 93.801°W	05:50–05:54	4.29 mi (6.90 km)	100 yd (91 m)	Several outbuildings were destroyed, several homes suffered roof damage, and trees were blown down.

== December ==
Confirmed tornadoes by Enhanced Fujita rating
EFU	EF0	EF1	EF2	EF3	EF4	EF5	Total
0	31	29	4	2	0	0	66

=== December 1 event ===
List of confirmed tornadoes – Saturday, December 1, 2018
EF#	Location	County / Parish	State	Start Coord.	Time (UTC)	Path length	Max width	Summary
EF0	Southern Monett	Barry	MO	38.8936°N 93.9261°W	06:15–06:16	0.12 mi (0.19 km)	50 yd (46 m)	Several homes sustained minor roof damage in a subdivision at the south edge of town.
EF1	Southern Aurora	Lawrence	MO	36.9432°N 93.7216°W	06:30–06:33	0.49 mi (0.79 km)	50 yd (46 m)	1 death – A tornado impacted the south side of Aurora, where the Aurora Inn Motel sustained heavy roof damage and collapse of several exterior walls on the second floor. A man was killed at this location after being thrown from his second floor room. A car dealership sustained collapse of an exterior wall, and vehicles had their windows blown out. A large home improvement store suffered significant roof, window, and exterior door damage, and outbuildings were damaged. Power lines were downed, and a large business sign was twisted as well.
EF0	S of Clever	Christian	MO	36.9943°N 93.4875°W	06:40–06:42	2.11 mi (3.40 km)	40 yd (37 m)	An outbuilding was destroyed, and numerous trees were damaged.
EF1	S of Billings	Christian	MO	37.033°N 93.5611°W	06:41–06:42	1.24 mi (2.00 km)	75 yd (69 m)	Numerous trees were snapped or uprooted, and homes suffered minor roof damage. Some outbuildings were damaged as well.
EF1	Western Republic	Greene	MO	37.11°N 93.53°W	06:47–06:50	2.48 mi (3.99 km)	60 yd (55 m)	Trees and tree limbs were snapped in the western part of Republic, and several homes sustained minor roof damage. Two large barns were destroyed outside of town as well.
EF1	NE of Seymour	Webster	MO	37.17°N 92.76°W	07:22–07:29	4.16 mi (6.69 km)	75 yd (69 m)	Several barns suffered extensive damage, and multiple trees were uprooted.
EF1	E of Hope	Hempstead	AR	33.5963°N 93.6658°W	07:25–07:34	8.51 mi (13.70 km)	75 yd (69 m)	Numerous trees were snapped or uprooted, a shed was shifted off its foundation, and homes sustained shingle and window damage. One home sustained roof and siding damage, and also had its carport ripped off. A heavy machinery shelter had its tin metal roof torn off, leading to column anchorage failure, and a power pole was snapped. A barn sustained removal of its tin roof as well.
EF0	NW of Hartville	Wright	MO	37.3188°N 92.5682°W	07:37–07:38	0.28 mi (0.45 km)	50 yd (46 m)	Large tree branches were snapped.
EF0	NW of Vicksburg	Bay	FL	30.4085°N 85.7476°W	19:47–19:53	2.4 mi (3.9 km)	50 yd (46 m)	Trees were downed.
EF1	NE of Pleasant Hill	Pike	IL	39.4439°N 90.851°W	19:54–19:58	1.65 mi (2.66 km)	25 yd (23 m)	A grain bin was tossed 15 ft (4.6 m), a barn had most of its metal roof removed, another barn was rolled 20 yd (18 m) off its foundation, and a few other outbuildings were damaged or destroyed. Tree limbs were snapped as well.
EF0	NW of Detroit	Pike	IL	39.6319°N 90.7143°W	20:29–20:30	0.11 mi (0.18 km)	25 yd (23 m)	Brief tornado downed several trees, inflicted minor roof damage to a home, and flipped a large RV camper onto its side.
EF0	NE of Vaiden	Perry	AL	32.529°N 87.364°W	20:34–20:36	0.3 mi (0.48 km)	75 yd (69 m)	Several trees were snapped or uprooted, two mobile homes suffered minor roof and siding damage, and vehicles were damaged as well. Roofing material and a trampoline were lofted into trees.
EF1	NNW of Valley City	Pike	IL	39.7272°N 90.6537°W	20:40–20:42	0.6 mi (0.97 km)	110 yd (100 m)	A mobile home lost its roof and an exterior wall, and outbuildings were damaged or destroyed. A trailer was rolled 25 yd (23 m), and a house sustained minor damage. Many trees were snapped or uprooted.
EF1	N of Camden	Schuyler	IL	40.2219°N 90.7732°W	21:00–21:02	1.4 mi (2.3 km)	100 yd (91 m)	Outbuildings were damaged.
EF0	NE of Meredosia	Morgan	IL	39.8559°N 90.5192°W	21:01–21:03	1.71 mi (2.75 km)	50 yd (46 m)	This tornado remained over open fields, causing no damage.
EF0	NW of Arenzville	Cass	IL	39.9115°N 90.4667°W	21:09–21:10	0.64 mi (1.03 km)	50 yd (46 m)	A large water container and some outbuildings were damaged.
EF0	NW of Industry	McDonough	IL	40.36°N 90.65°W	21:18–21:19	0.1 mi (0.16 km)	15 yd (14 m)	A trained storm spotter reported a brief tornado. No damage occurred.
EF1	Southeastern Beardstown	Cass	IL	40.0005°N 90.4201°W	21:25–21:33	4.23 mi (6.81 km)	200 yd (180 m)	Trees and power poles were snapped, and a water treatment plant in Beardstown was damaged, including three of four wells that serve the city. Several vehicles had their windows shattered, and a few other structures in town had roof and window damage. Outside of town, a machine shed was destroyed, a house sustained roof and siding damage, an irrigation system was flipped, and additional trees were snapped before the tornado dissipated.
EF0	SW of Bardolph	McDonough	IL	40.48°N 90.59°W	21:41–21:42	0.1 mi (0.16 km)	15 yd (14 m)	A trained storm spotter reported a brief tornado. No damage occurred.
EF0	E of Browning	Mason	IL	40.1203°N 90.3157°W	21:44–21:46	1.67 mi (2.69 km)	25 yd (23 m)	Brief tornado at Chain Lake caused no damage.
EF0	SW of Billingsley	Autauga	AL	32.6326°N 86.7415°W	21:49–21:50	0.26 mi (0.42 km)	100 yd (91 m)	Storm chaser video and a debris signature on radar were used to confirm a brief tornado. The area was inaccessible.
EF1	SW of Bluff City to SE of Lewistown	Schuyler, Fulton	IL	40.1622°N 90.2581°W	21:51–22:18	15.61 mi (25.12 km)	450 yd (410 m)	This large tornado passed near Havana, pushing a home off its foundation, and blowing out the exterior wall of an attached garage at another home. Other homes sustained damage to roofs, windows, and siding. Outbuildings were destroyed, and numerous trees were snapped or uprooted. Power lines were damaged, along with several buildings at a winery.
EF1	NE of Staunton	Macoupin	IL	39.031°N 89.7523°W	21:59–22:01	1.39 mi (2.24 km)	50 yd (46 m)	A high-end EF1 tornado began at an antique car business, damaging that structure, flipping a car, and destroying a large storage shed. A house, two farm buildings, another structure, and trees were also damaged. A piece of farming equipment was overturned as well.
EF1	SW of Raymond	Montgomery	IL	39.2315°N 89.6819°W	22:09–22:21	8.03 mi (12.92 km)	75 yd (69 m)	Outbuildings were damaged or destroyed, a residence suffered extensive roof and garage damage, and several trees and power poles were snapped.
EF2	SE of Litchfield to NW of Butler	Montgomery	IL	39.1522°N 89.6324°W	22:16–22:29	6.79 mi (10.93 km)	100 yd (91 m)	A brick house had its roof ripped off and sustained partial collapse of its front exterior wall. Barns and outbuildings were destroyed, and trees were snapped or uprooted as well.
EF1	SE of Raymond	Montgomery	IL	39.2584°N 89.5486°W	22:32–22:36	1.97 mi (3.17 km)	50 yd (46 m)	A few outbuildings were destroyed, several trees were uprooted, and a home sustained minor roof and shingle damage.
EF0	SE of Canton	Fulton	IL	40.4543°N 90.0113°W	22:45–22:56	5.54 mi (8.92 km)	25 yd (23 m)	Numerous trees were damaged.
EF0	E of Harvel	Montgomery, Christian	IL	39.348°N 89.4577°W	22:47–22:54	3.11 mi (5.01 km)	200 yd (180 m)	A farm storage building was damaged and some trees were snapped. An outbuilding was moved off its foundation and had one of its walls knocked out, while other outbuildings sustained roof and wall damage as well.
EF1	W of Easton to ESE of Forest City	Mason	IL	40.2325°N 89.9335°W	22:53–23:17	11.68 mi (18.80 km)	250 yd (230 m)	Trees were snapped or uprooted, power poles were damaged, and many irrigation systems were overturned. One person was injured.
EF3	SSE of Palmer to Taylorville	Christian	IL	39.414°N 89.395°W	23:01–23:25	12.49 mi (20.10 km)	900 yd (820 m)	See section on this tornado - Twenty-two people were injured.
EF0	SW of South Pekin	Tazewell	IL	40.4673°N 89.7347°W	23:34–23:35	0.12 mi (0.19 km)	50 yd (46 m)	A couple of outbuildings were overturned, a pool deck structure was damaged, and an irrigation system was tipped over.
EF2	Southwestern Stonington to NW of Blue Mound	Christian	IL	39.6301°N 89.2008°W	23:34–23:52	8.39 mi (13.50 km)	400 yd (370 m)	This tornado touched down in Stonington, where trees and power poles were snapped, homes sustained roof damage, and garages and sheds were destroyed. The tornado reached its maximum intensity north of town, where well-built barns were completely destroyed. A few additional outbuildings were damaged near Blue Mound before the tornado dissipated.
EF1	WSW of Boody	Macon	IL	39.7469°N 89.1378°W	23:53–23:59	4.27 mi (6.87 km)	250 yd (230 m)	A manufactured home was pushed off its foundation, multiple outbuildings were destroyed, power poles were damaged, and trees were snapped.
EF0	Harristown	Macon	IL	39.8370°N 89.0869°W	00:03–00:04	0.41 mi (0.66 km)	50 yd (46 m)	A brief tornado caused minor tree and roof damage in Harristown.
EF1	E of Rochester	Sangamon	IL	39.7488°N 89.4999°W	00:16–00:33	4.57 mi (7.35 km)	100 yd (91 m)	Multiple homes sustained considerable damage to their roofs, siding, and garages. Trees were downed and power poles were damaged, and a large metal garage was damaged by a falling tree.
EF1	SE of Maroa	Macon	IL	40.0074°N 88.0441°W	00:31–00:33	1.13 mi (1.82 km)	320 yd (290 m)	A house sustained minor shingle damage, outbuildings were destroyed, and trees were snapped.
EF1	SSW of Le Roy	McLean	IL	40.2894°N 88.7791°W	01:06–01:07	0.21 mi (0.34 km)	50 yd (46 m)	Trees were snapped, a house sustained minor shingle damage, outbuildings were damaged, and a street sign was blown over.
EF2	NE of Le Roy	McLean	IL	40.3839°N 88.7228°W	01:18–01:20	2.44 mi (3.93 km)	100 yd (91 m)	A house had its attached garage and much of its roof ripped off, an outbuilding was damaged, and trees were snapped.
EF0	SW of Ellsworth	McLean	IL	40.4102°N 88.7671°W	01:21–01:22	0.12 mi (0.19 km)	25 yd (23 m)	A metal outbuilding had one of its walls blown out.
EF1	W of Colfax	McLean	IL	40.5656°N 88.6713°W	01:42–01:44	0.49 mi (0.79 km)	75 yd (69 m)	Outbuildings were destroyed and trees were damaged.

=== December 2 event ===
List of confirmed tornadoes – Sunday, December 2, 2018
EF#	Location	County / Parish	State	Start Coord.	Time (UTC)	Path length	Max width	Summary
EF1	NW of Terrell	Worth	GA	31.6445°N 83.831°W	07:46–07:49	1.48 mi (2.38 km)	350 yd (320 m)	Outbuildings suffered significant damage, a few manufactured homes sustained minor damage, and numerous trees were snapped or uprooted.
EF0	W of Dothan	Houston	AL	31.2374°N 85.4872°W	07:49–07:51	1.03 mi (1.66 km)	75 yd (69 m)	Several dozen trees were snapped or uprooted. Fences were damaged, a power pole was snapped, a couple of homes suffered roof damage, and a car was flipped over.
EF0	W of Omega	Tift	GA	31.339°N 83.6184°W	14:22–14:28	1.86 mi (2.99 km)	600 yd (550 m)	Irrigation systems, trees, and a substation sustained some damage.
EF0	SE of Willacoochee	Atkinson	GA	31.2925°N 83.0196°W	19:14–19:15	3.2 mi (5.1 km)	50 yd (46 m)	Tree tops were snapped.
EF0	Pearson	Atkinson	GA	31.31°N 82.86°W	19:30–19:31	0.19 mi (0.31 km)	50 yd (46 m)	A home security camera videoed a tornado that caused minor damage to the property.
EF1	Colonels Island	Glynn	GA	31.13°N 81.56°W	19:40–19:49	0.59 mi (0.95 km)	80 yd (73 m)	A few dozen trees were damaged or snapped.
EF3	Naval Submarine Base Kings Bay	Camden	GA	30.78°N 81.55°W	20:10–20:20	7.09 mi (11.41 km)	900 yd (820 m)	A large, strong tornado struck the Naval Submarine Base Kings Bay, throwing and damaging heavy metal brows, vehicles, metal storage containers, and utility trailers. Metal railings were twisted, power poles were downed, and a large crane on a barge was torn loose from its moorings. Numerous trees were snapped on Cumberland Island before the tornado exited into the Atlantic Ocean. A wind gust of 144 mph (232 km/h) was measured by a docked Coast Guard vessel as the tornado struck the base. Four people were injured, including two sailors that were thrown from a boat into the water.
EF0	S of Hopkins	Ware	GA	30.6911°N 82.3895°W	23:48–23:49	1.4 mi (2.3 km)	50 yd (46 m)	A debris ball signature on radar confirmed a tornado.

=== December 3 event ===
List of confirmed tornadoes – Monday, December 3, 2018
EF#	Location	County / Parish	State	Start Coord.	Time (UTC)	Path length	Max width
EF1	W of Pinetta	Madison	FL	30.6087°N 83.485°W	07:34–07:39	2.15 mi (3.46 km)	279 yd (255 m)
EF1	One mobile home was shifted entirely off its blocks while a second was moved less severely, a small outbuilding was swept off its foundation and rolled, and considerable tree damage occurred.						

=== December 9 event ===
List of confirmed tornadoes – Sunday, December 9, 2018
EF#	Location	County / Parish	State	Start Coord.	Time (UTC)	Path length	Max width
EF1	ENE of New Port Richey	Pasco	FL	28.2555°N 82.6883°W	13:57–13:58	0.12 mi (0.19 km)	25 yd (23 m)
EF1	Large tree limbs and power lines were downed. Some homes had their shingles and roofing ripped off. One large tree was snapped.						
EF1	E of Wimauma	Hillsborough	FL	27.703°N 82.249°W	16:21–16:25	2.76 mi (4.44 km)	50 yd (46 m)
EF1	Minor tree and structural damage was observed.						
EF0	ESE of Union Park	Orange	FL	28.5429°N 81.2304°W	16:54–16:55	0.13 mi (0.21 km)	50 yd (46 m)
EF0	A screened pool enclosure at a home was destroyed. Two other homes suffered minor structural damage.						

=== December 18 event ===
List of confirmed tornadoes – Tuesday, December 18, 2018
EF#	Location	County / Parish	State	Start Coord.	Time (UTC)	Path length	Max width
EF2	Port Orchard	Kitsap	WA	47.507°N 122.6395°W	21:50–21:55	1.35 mi (2.17 km)	285 yd (261 m)
EF2	See article on this tornado						

=== December 20 event ===
List of confirmed tornadoes – Thursday, December 20, 2018
EF#	Location	County / Parish	State	Start Coord.	Time (UTC)	Path length	Max width
EF0	E of Lake Manatee State Park	Manatee	FL	27.4608°N 82.2276°W	13:32–13:33	0.19 mi (0.31 km)	125 yd (114 m)
EF0	A carport was destroyed and trees fell onto a shed. Numerous tree branches were snapped.						
EF0	E of Fort Meade	Polk	FL	27.7532°N 81.7702°W	13:45–13:51	0.76 mi (1.22 km)	75 yd (69 m)
EF0	Trees were uprooted.						
EF0	WSW of Crooked Lake Park	Polk	FL	27.8287°N 81.6011°W	14:14–14:15	0.07 mi (0.11 km)	30 yd (27 m)
EF0	The southeastern unit of a four-unit duplex sustained partial roof uplift, the eastern unit suffered broken windows, and the northeast unit suffered some roof damage as well. One person was injured.						
EF0	Port Charlotte	Charlotte	FL	27.007°N 82.1342°W	17:28–17:30	1.02 mi (1.64 km)	100 yd (91 m)
EF0	A business sustained roof damage while trees were downed. A weather station on a public building recorded a maximum wind gust of 75 mph (121 km/h).						
EF0	Wilmington	New Hanover	NC	34.1738°N 77.8812°W	22:10–22:12	0.33 mi (0.53 km)	40 yd (37 m)
EF0	Numerous trees were damaged, including some that were uprooted onto at least three homes. A large wooden shed was flipped over, and a small boat was knocked onto its side.						

=== December 26 event ===
List of confirmed tornadoes – Wednesday, December 26, 2018
EF#	Location	County / Parish	State	Start Coord.	Time (UTC)	Path length	Max width
EF0	NE of Afton	Dickens	TX	33.7772°N 100.7792°W	21:40–21:41	0.34 mi (0.55 km)	30 yd (27 m)
EF0	Three silos were heavily damaged by a tornado spawned from a non-supercell storm.						
EF0	Clarendon	Donley	TX	34.931°N 100.8941°W	22:23–22:24	0.57 mi (0.92 km)	100 yd (91 m)
EF0	Many tree limbs were broken. A few homes suffered sheet metal roof damage or had their shingles peeled up.						

=== December 27 event ===
List of confirmed tornadoes – Thursday, December 27, 2018
EF#	Location	County / Parish	State	Start Coord.	Time (UTC)	Path length	Max width
EF1	W of Vernon Lake	Vernon	LA	31.1908°N 93.5018°W	12:12–12:13	0.32 mi (0.51 km)	100 yd (91 m)
EF1	Several pine trees were snapped.						
EF1	S of Crowley	Acadia	LA	30.1302°N 92.3645°W	16:15–16:17	0.6 mi (0.97 km)	25 yd (23 m)
EF1	Several trees were snapped.						
EF0	S of Oil City	Yazoo	MS	32.6431°N 90.4509°W	16:29–16:30	1.29 mi (2.08 km)	100 yd (91 m)
EF0	Around a dozen trees had limbs snapped off and a few smaller trees were uprooted. Some tin covering was peeled off and blown a short distance.						

=== December 31 event ===
List of confirmed tornadoes – Monday, December 31, 2018
EF#	Location	County / Parish	State	Start Coord.	Time (UTC)	Path length	Max width
EF1	Lake Barkley	Trigg	KY	36.89°N 87.987°W	18:35–18:36	0.76 mi (1.22 km)	125 yd (114 m)
EF1	A brief tornado initially touched down on Lake Barkley and damaged six homes, most of which lost shingles and vinyl siding. Three garage doors were blown inward and one garage lost shingles. A couple dozen trees were snapped or uprooted.						
EF1	S of Ferdinand	Spencer	IN	38.1813°N 86.8863°W	19:43–19:45	2.01 mi (3.23 km)	50 yd (46 m)
EF1	A brief tornado caused roof and fascia damage. A garage door was blown in and a detached garage was destroyed with debris carried 300 yd (270 m). A storage shed was pushed several feet from its foundation and three metal farm buildings suffered minor roof damage. At least two dozen trees and tree limbs were snapped or uprooted.						
EF1	S of Dogwood	Harrison	IN	38.0935°N 86.0869°W	20:38–20:41	2.2 mi (3.5 km)	140 yd (130 m)
EF1	Near where the tornado touched down, a house had shingles torn off and sustained considerable damage from a heavy chain link fence that was thrown into it. A swing set was thrown, a birdhouse post was bent over at a 60-degree angle, and a chicken house was rolled over nearby. Farther along the path, trees were twisted and snapped, and hundreds of corn stalks were picked up and thrown. One barn was destroyed and another barn and a mobile home suffered damage to their side panels.						

== See also ==
- Tornadoes of 2018
- List of United States tornadoes from August to October 2018
- List of United States tornadoes from January to February 2019
