= Tornado outbreak of November 30 – December 2, 2018 =

Weather event in the central US

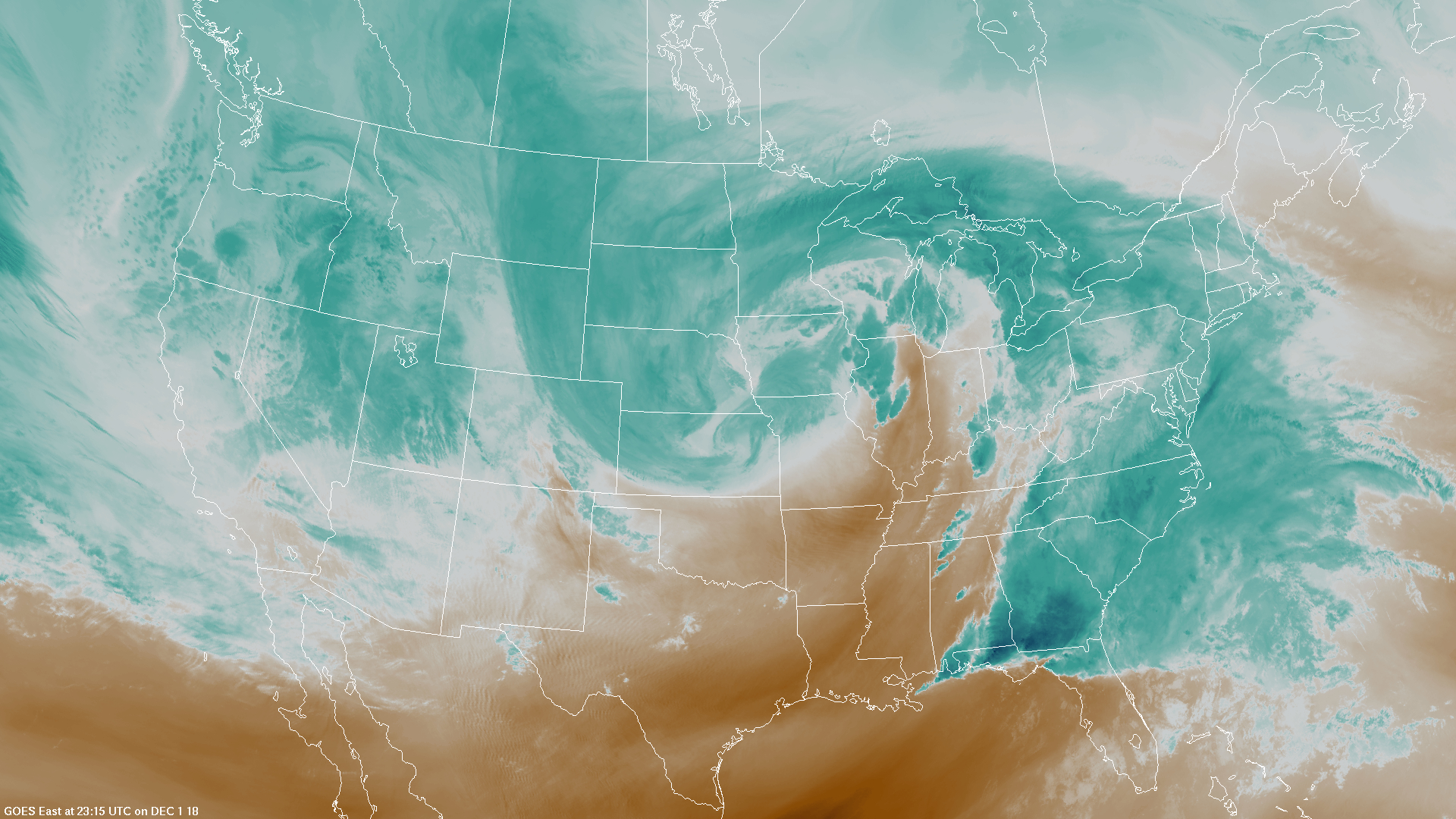
- The large storm complex across the Midwestern United States on December 1, 2018

Meteorological history
- Formed: November 30, 2018
- Dissipated: December 2, 2018

Tornado outbreak
- Tornadoes: 55
- Max. rating: EF3 tornado
- Duration: 1 day, 16 hours, and 20 minutes
- Highest winds: Tornadic – 155 mph (249 km/h) (Taylorville, Illinois EF3 on December 1); Straight-line – 83 mph (134 km/h) west of Shell Knob, Missouri and west of Republic, Missouri
- Lowest pressure: 986 hPa (mbar); 29.12 inHg
- Largest hail: 1.75 in (4.4 cm) at multiple locations
- Max. rainfall: 0.11 in (0.28 cm) north of Caribou, Maine
- Max. snowfall: 17.1 in (43 cm) northeast of Burke, South Dakota

Overall effects
- Fatalities: 1
- Injuries: 33
- Damage: $300 million (2018 USD)
- Areas affected: West South Central states, Midwestern United States
- Part of the 2018–19 North American winter and tornado outbreaks of 2018

A late-season tornado outbreak occurred across portions of the West South Central states and Midwestern United States between November 30 and December 2, 2018. As a potent shortwave trough moved across the southern portions of the country, it was met with ample moisture return and destabilization, resulting in widespread severe thunderstorms that produced damaging winds, hail, and tornadoes. The event began late on November 30 in Oklahoma, spreading east and resulting in one fatality in Aurora, Missouri. Several tornadic supercells moved across portions of Illinois on December 1, and resulted in 29 confirmed tornadoes. This outbreak was the largest December tornado event on record in Illinois history, surpassing the December 1957 tornado outbreak sequence. The most significant tornado of the event was an EF3 that impacted Taylorville, Illinois, damaging or destroying hundreds of structures and injuring 22 people.

== Meteorological synopsis ==
=== November 30 ===
The first advertised threat for organized severe weather came on November 26, when the Storm Prediction Center (SPC) outlined a day 5 risk area across portions of the Southern Plains. A large slight risk was introduced for portions of Oklahoma, Texas, Arkansas, Louisiana, and Mississippi on November 28, with an upgrade to enhanced risk for much of those same locations the next morning. On November 30, a vigorous shortwave trough—part of an active wave train within the subtropical jet—progressed from Arizona into the Central Plains. The Storm Prediction Center maintained an enhanced risk for severe weather, including a 10% hatched risk area for tornadoes. As an expansive 110–140 kn (130–160 mph; 200–260 km/h) jet stream pushed through the trough, it began to take on a negative tilt. A surface low developed over Colorado in response, pushing into eastern Kansas by early on December 1. Despite a confined warm sector, the combined influence of moderate CAPE around 500–1,500 J/kg, an 850 mb (hPa) jet stronger than 50 kn (58 mph; 93 km/h), low lifted condensation levels (LCLs), cold temperatures aloft (steep lapse rates), weakening convective inhibition, and persistent moisture transport (warm-air advection (WAA)) resulted in the formation of semi-discrete supercells and quasi-linear convective systems (QLCSs) that resulted in widespread damaging wind reports and several tornadoes. In Oklahoma, a large and long-tracked EF2 wedge tornado impacted areas near Tenkiller Ferry Lake, damaging or destroying many homes and other structures, downing countless trees, and injuring 5 people. Another EF2 tornado struck Van Buren, Arkansas, causing major damage to several homes. A few other weak tornadoes were also confirmed.

=== December 1 ===
During the very early morning hours of December 1, an EF1 tornado struck the southern part of Aurora, Missouri, killing one person at a motel and damaging a few other nearby businesses. Later that day, the deepening area of low pressure—initially over Kansas—shifted into Iowa as it occluded. The aforementioned shortwave progressed into the Mississippi River Valley, supporting the formation of a secondary surface low pressure over Missouri that moved toward the Great Lakes. A mid-level area of low pressure was centered farther west near the surface low, and was a cold-core low, within a longwave trough extending over the outbreak area and which provided cold air aloft, steeper lapse rates, and thus higher convective instability. Low level instability as measured by surface to 3 km (10,000 ft) CAPE was also significant, especially for a cold-core setup, reaching values of 200 J/kg. Within the warm sector of this feature, a pronounced dry slot allowed for relatively substantial destabilization, with mixed-layer CAPE increasing to 500–1,200 J/kg. Strong deep-layer shear and pronounced low-level directional shear as a result of backed surface winds contributed to enlarged bell-shaped hodographs, with dew points upwards of 60 °F (16 °C), resulting in an outbreak of tornadic supercells across western and central Illinois throughout the afternoon hours and extending into the evening, even though the SPC had only issued a slight risk and 5% tornado forecast for the region. Numerous tornadoes were reported in Illinois, most of which occurred as a result two long-tracked, cyclic supercell thunderstorms. This included an EF3 wedge tornado that caused major damage throughout portions of Taylorville, Illinois, injuring 22 people. At 5:15 PM, a tornado emergency was issued for Central Christian County. A total of 406 homes in Taylorville sustained some form of damage; 66 homes suffered major damage; and 34 homes experienced severe damage or total destruction. An EF1 tornado caused moderate damage in Beardstown, while EF2 tornadoes ripped roofs off of homes near Litchfield and Le Roy. Another EF2 touched down in Stoningon, snapping trees and power poles, and destroying garages before leveling several barns outside of town. Producing 29 tornadoes in the state, this was the largest December tornado outbreak in Illinois history. Further south, a secondary area of severe weather produced two EF0 tornadoes in Alabama.

=== December 2 ===
A few isolated tornadoes continued to touch down across the Southern United States on December 2. This included strong EF3 tornado that struck the Naval Submarine Base Kings Bay in Camden County, Georgia, tossing heavy objects and injuring four people. Rare severe thunderstorm watches with an isolated tornado warning were issued as far north as southern Ontario in Canada. No tornadoes were reported in Ontario; however, a lightning strike sparked a fire at a home near Mount Forest, causing an estimated CA$175,000 in damage.

== Confirmed tornadoes ==
Confirmed tornadoes by Enhanced Fujita rating
| EFU | EF0 | EF1 | EF2 | EF3 | EF4 | EF5 | Total |
|---|---|---|---|---|---|---|---|
| 0 | 25 | 24 | 5 | 2 | 0 | 0 | 55 |

=== November 30 event ===
List of confirmed tornadoes – Friday, November 30, 2018 (Note: All dates are based on the local time zone where the tornado touched down; however, all times are in Coordinated Universal Time for consistency.)
| EF# | Location | County / Parish | State | Start Coord. | Time (UTC) | Path length | Max width |
|---|---|---|---|---|---|---|---|
| EF0 | Tishomingo | Johnston | OK | 34.2278°N 96.6806°W | 02:58–02:59 | 0.9 mi (1.4 km) | 60 yd (55 m) |
| EF0 | Roof and tree damage occurred, including to an elementary school. | | | | | | |
| EF1 | SE of Webbers Falls | Muskogee, Sequoyah | OK | 35.4606°N 95.1130°W | 03:28–03:37 | 7.1 mi (11.4 km) | 400 yd (370 m) |
| EF1 | Several center irrigation systems were destroyed, barns were damaged, and trees were snapped. | | | | | | |
| EF0 | SW of Skiatook | Osage | OK | 36.3141°N 96.0409°W | 03:36–03:38 | 1.5 mi (2.4 km) | 200 yd (180 m) |
| EF0 | Two mobile homes were severely damaged, a home sustained roof damage, a barn was damaged, and tree limbs were snapped. | | | | | | |
| EF2 | Blackgum to E of Proctor to SE of Colcord | Sequoyah, Cherokee, Adair, Delaware | OK | 35.6064°N 94.9933°W | 03:43–04:46 | 47 mi (76 km) | 1,100 yd (1,000 m) |
| EF2 | See section on this tornado - Five people were injured. | | | | | | |
| EF2 | Northwestern Van Buren to NE of Rena | Crawford | AR | 35.4601°N 94.3993°W | 05:09–05:14 | 5.6 mi (9.0 km) | 600 yd (550 m) |
| EF2 | This strong tornado touched down in residential areas of Van Buren and damaged numerous homes, a few of which had their roofs torn off and sustained loss of some exterior walls. Pieces of lumber were speared through the exterior walls of neighboring homes. Multiple wooden double-pole utility structures were snapped off at the base, many trees were snapped or uprooted, and a pickup truck was overturned. Several apartment complexes also sustained roof damage. Additional trees were downed just north of Rena and further along the path before the tornado dissipated. | | | | | | |
| EF1 | N of Rudy | Crawford | AR | 35.5320°N 94.2691°W | 05:17–05:24 | 8.7 mi (14.0 km) | 700 yd (640 m) |
| EF1 | Barns were destroyed, power poles were damaged, and numerous trees were snapped or uprooted. A house sustained minor damage. | | | | | | |
| EF0 | N of Magazine | Logan | AR | 35.1929°N 93.801°W | 05:50–05:54 | 4.29 mi (6.90 km) | 100 yd (91 m) |
| EF0 | Several outbuildings were destroyed, several homes suffered roof damage, and trees were blown down. | | | | | | |

=== December 1 event ===
List of confirmed tornadoes – Saturday, December 1, 2018
| EF# | Location | County / Parish | State | Start Coord. | Time (UTC) | Path length | Max width |
|---|---|---|---|---|---|---|---|
| EF0 | Southern Monett | Barry | MO | 38.8936°N 93.9261°W | 06:15–06:16 | 0.12 mi (0.19 km) | 50 yd (46 m) |
| EF0 | Several homes sustained minor roof damage in a subdivision at the south edge of town. | | | | | | |
| EF1 | Southern Aurora | Lawrence | MO | 36.9432°N 93.7216°W | 06:30–06:33 | 0.49 mi (0.79 km) | 50 yd (46 m) |
| EF1 | 1 death – A tornado impacted the south side of Aurora, where the Aurora Inn Motel sustained heavy roof damage and collapse of several exterior walls on the second floor. A man was killed at this location after being thrown from his second floor room. A car dealership sustained collapse of an exterior wall, and vehicles had their windows blown out. A large home improvement store suffered significant roof, window, and exterior door damage, and outbuildings were damaged. Power lines were downed, and a large business sign was twisted as well. | | | | | | |
| EF0 | S of Clever | Christian | MO | 36.9943°N 93.4875°W | 06:40–06:42 | 2.11 mi (3.40 km) | 40 yd (37 m) |
| EF0 | An outbuilding was destroyed, and numerous trees were damaged. | | | | | | |
| EF1 | S of Billings | Christian | MO | 37.033°N 93.5611°W | 06:41–06:42 | 1.24 mi (2.00 km) | 75 yd (69 m) |
| EF1 | Numerous trees were snapped or uprooted, and homes suffered minor roof damage. Some outbuildings were damaged as well. | | | | | | |
| EF1 | Western Republic | Greene | MO | 37.11°N 93.53°W | 06:47–06:50 | 2.48 mi (3.99 km) | 60 yd (55 m) |
| EF1 | Trees and tree limbs were snapped in the western part of Republic, and several homes sustained minor roof damage. Two large barns were destroyed outside of town as well. | | | | | | |
| EF1 | NE of Seymour | Webster | MO | 37.17°N 92.76°W | 07:22–07:29 | 4.16 mi (6.69 km) | 75 yd (69 m) |
| EF1 | Several barns suffered extensive damage, and multiple trees were uprooted. | | | | | | |
| EF1 | E of Hope | Hempstead | AR | 33.5963°N 93.6658°W | 07:25–07:34 | 8.51 mi (13.70 km) | 75 yd (69 m) |
| EF1 | Numerous trees were snapped or uprooted, a shed was shifted off its foundation, and homes sustained shingle and window damage. One home sustained roof and siding damage, and also had its carport ripped off. A heavy machinery shelter had its tin metal roof torn off, leading to column anchorage failure, and a power pole was snapped. A barn sustained removal of its tin roof as well. | | | | | | |
| EF0 | NW of Hartville | Wright | MO | 37.3188°N 92.5682°W | 07:37–07:38 | 0.28 mi (0.45 km) | 50 yd (46 m) |
| EF0 | Large tree branches were snapped. | | | | | | |
| EF0 | NW of Vicksburg | Bay | FL | 30.4085°N 85.7476°W | 19:47–19:53 | 2.4 mi (3.9 km) | 50 yd (46 m) |
| EF0 | Trees were downed. | | | | | | |
| EF1 | NE of Pleasant Hill | Pike | IL | 39.4439°N 90.851°W | 19:54–19:58 | 1.65 mi (2.66 km) | 25 yd (23 m) |
| EF1 | A grain bin was tossed 15 ft (4.6 m), a barn had most of its metal roof removed, another barn was rolled 20 yd (18 m) off its foundation, and a few other outbuildings were damaged or destroyed. Tree limbs were snapped as well. | | | | | | |
| EF0 | NW of Detroit | Pike | IL | 39.6319°N 90.7143°W | 20:29–20:30 | 0.11 mi (0.18 km) | 25 yd (23 m) |
| EF0 | Brief tornado downed several trees, inflicted minor roof damage to a home, and flipped a large RV camper onto its side. | | | | | | |
| EF0 | NE of Vaiden | Perry | AL | 32.529°N 87.364°W | 20:34–20:36 | 0.3 mi (0.48 km) | 75 yd (69 m) |
| EF0 | Several trees were snapped or uprooted, two mobile homes suffered minor roof and siding damage, and vehicles were damaged as well. Roofing material and a trampoline were lofted into trees. | | | | | | |
| EF1 | NNW of Valley City | Pike | IL | 39.7272°N 90.6537°W | 20:40–20:42 | 0.6 mi (0.97 km) | 110 yd (100 m) |
| EF1 | A mobile home lost its roof and an exterior wall, and outbuildings were damaged or destroyed. A trailer was rolled 25 yd (23 m), and a house sustained minor damage. Many trees were snapped or uprooted. | | | | | | |
| EF1 | N of Camden | Schuyler | IL | 40.2219°N 90.7732°W | 21:00–21:02 | 1.4 mi (2.3 km) | 100 yd (91 m) |
| EF1 | Outbuildings were damaged. | | | | | | |
| EF0 | NE of Meredosia | Morgan | IL | 39.8559°N 90.5192°W | 21:01–21:03 | 1.71 mi (2.75 km) | 50 yd (46 m) |
| EF0 | This tornado remained over open fields, causing no damage. | | | | | | |
| EF0 | NW of Arenzville | Cass | IL | 39.9115°N 90.4667°W | 21:09–21:10 | 0.64 mi (1.03 km) | 50 yd (46 m) |
| EF0 | A large water container and some outbuildings were damaged. | | | | | | |
| EF0 | NW of Industry | McDonough | IL | 40.36°N 90.65°W | 21:18–21:19 | 0.1 mi (0.16 km) | 15 yd (14 m) |
| EF0 | A trained storm spotter reported a brief tornado. No damage occurred. | | | | | | |
| EF1 | Southeastern Beardstown | Cass | IL | 40.0005°N 90.4201°W | 21:25–21:33 | 4.23 mi (6.81 km) | 200 yd (180 m) |
| EF1 | Trees and power poles were snapped, and a water treatment plant in Beardstown was damaged, including three of four wells that serve the city. Several vehicles had their windows shattered, and a few other structures in town had roof and window damage. Outside of town, a machine shed was destroyed, a house sustained roof and siding damage, an irrigation system was flipped, and additional trees were snapped before the tornado dissipated. | | | | | | |
| EF0 | SW of Bardolph | McDonough | IL | 40.48°N 90.59°W | 21:41–21:42 | 0.1 mi (0.16 km) | 15 yd (14 m) |
| EF0 | A trained storm spotter reported a brief tornado. No damage occurred. | | | | | | |
| EF0 | E of Browning | Mason | IL | 40.1203°N 90.3157°W | 21:44–21:46 | 1.67 mi (2.69 km) | 25 yd (23 m) |
| EF0 | Brief tornado at Chain Lake caused no damage. | | | | | | |
| EF0 | SW of Billingsley | Autauga | AL | 32.6326°N 86.7415°W | 21:49–21:50 | 0.26 mi (0.42 km) | 100 yd (91 m) |
| EF0 | Storm chaser video and a debris signature on radar were used to confirm a brief tornado. The area was inaccessible. | | | | | | |
| EF1 | SW of Bluff City to SE of Lewistown | Schuyler, Fulton | IL | 40.1622°N 90.2581°W | 21:51–22:18 | 15.61 mi (25.12 km) | 450 yd (410 m) |
| EF1 | This large tornado passed near Havana, pushing a home off its foundation, and blowing out the exterior wall of an attached garage at another home. Other homes sustained damage to roofs, windows, and siding. Outbuildings were destroyed, and numerous trees were snapped or uprooted. Power lines were damaged, along with several buildings at a winery. | | | | | | |
| EF1 | NE of Staunton | Macoupin | IL | 39.031°N 89.7523°W | 21:59–22:01 | 1.39 mi (2.24 km) | 50 yd (46 m) |
| EF1 | A high-end EF1 tornado began at an antique car business, damaging that structure, flipping a car, and destroying a large storage shed. A house, two farm buildings, another structure, and trees were also damaged. A piece of farming equipment was overturned as well. | | | | | | |
| EF1 | SW of Raymond | Montgomery | IL | 39.2315°N 89.6819°W | 22:09–22:21 | 8.03 mi (12.92 km) | 75 yd (69 m) |
| EF1 | Outbuildings were damaged or destroyed, a residence suffered extensive roof and garage damage, and several trees and power poles were snapped. | | | | | | |
| EF2 | SE of Litchfield to NW of Butler | Montgomery | IL | 39.1522°N 89.6324°W | 22:16–22:29 | 6.79 mi (10.93 km) | 100 yd (91 m) |
| EF2 | A brick house had its roof ripped off and sustained partial collapse of its front exterior wall. Barns and outbuildings were destroyed, and trees were snapped or uprooted as well. | | | | | | |
| EF1 | SE of Raymond | Montgomery | IL | 39.2584°N 89.5486°W | 22:32–22:36 | 1.97 mi (3.17 km) | 50 yd (46 m) |
| EF1 | A few outbuildings were destroyed, several trees were uprooted, and a home sustained minor roof and shingle damage. | | | | | | |
| EF0 | SE of Canton | Fulton | IL | 40.4543°N 90.0113°W | 22:45–22:56 | 5.54 mi (8.92 km) | 25 yd (23 m) |
| EF0 | Numerous trees were damaged. | | | | | | |
| EF0 | E of Harvel | Montgomery, Christian | IL | 39.348°N 89.4577°W | 22:47–22:54 | 3.11 mi (5.01 km) | 200 yd (180 m) |
| EF0 | A farm storage building was damaged and some trees were snapped. An outbuilding was moved off its foundation and had one of its walls knocked out, while other outbuildings sustained roof and wall damage as well. | | | | | | |
| EF1 | W of Easton to ESE of Forest City | Mason | IL | 40.2325°N 89.9335°W | 22:53–23:17 | 11.68 mi (18.80 km) | 250 yd (230 m) |
| EF1 | Trees were snapped or uprooted, power poles were damaged, and many irrigation systems were overturned. One person was injured. | | | | | | |
| EF3 | SSE of Palmer to Taylorville | Christian | IL | 39.414°N 89.395°W | 23:01–23:25 | 12.49 mi (20.10 km) | 900 yd (820 m) |
| EF3 | See section on this tornado - Twenty-two people were injured. | | | | | | |
| EF0 | SW of South Pekin | Tazewell | IL | 40.4673°N 89.7347°W | 23:34–23:35 | 0.12 mi (0.19 km) | 50 yd (46 m) |
| EF0 | A couple of outbuildings were overturned, a pool deck structure was damaged, and an irrigation system was tipped over. | | | | | | |
| EF2 | Southwestern Stonington to NW of Blue Mound | Christian | IL | 39.6301°N 89.2008°W | 23:34–23:52 | 8.39 mi (13.50 km) | 400 yd (370 m) |
| EF2 | This tornado touched down in Stonington, where trees and power poles were snapped, homes sustained roof damage, and garages and sheds were destroyed. The tornado reached its maximum intensity north of town, where well-built barns were completely destroyed. A few additional outbuildings were damaged near Blue Mound before the tornado dissipated. | | | | | | |
| EF1 | WSW of Boody | Macon | IL | 39.7469°N 89.1378°W | 23:53–23:59 | 4.27 mi (6.87 km) | 250 yd (230 m) |
| EF1 | A manufactured home was pushed off its foundation, multiple outbuildings were destroyed, power poles were damaged, and trees were snapped. | | | | | | |
| EF0 | Harristown | Macon | IL | 39.8370°N 89.0869°W | 00:03–00:04 | 0.41 mi (0.66 km) | 50 yd (46 m) |
| EF0 | A brief tornado caused minor tree and roof damage in Harristown. | | | | | | |
| EF1 | E of Rochester | Sangamon | IL | 39.7488°N 89.4999°W | 00:16–00:33 | 4.57 mi (7.35 km) | 100 yd (91 m) |
| EF1 | Multiple homes sustained considerable damage to their roofs, siding, and garages. Trees were downed and power poles were damaged, and a large metal garage was damaged by a falling tree. | | | | | | |
| EF1 | SE of Maroa | Macon | IL | 40.0074°N 88.0441°W | 00:31–00:33 | 1.13 mi (1.82 km) | 320 yd (290 m) |
| EF1 | A house sustained minor shingle damage, outbuildings were destroyed, and trees were snapped. | | | | | | |
| EF1 | SSW of Le Roy | McLean | IL | 40.2894°N 88.7791°W | 01:06–01:07 | 0.21 mi (0.34 km) | 50 yd (46 m) |
| EF1 | Trees were snapped, a house sustained minor shingle damage, outbuildings were damaged, and a street sign was blown over. | | | | | | |
| EF2 | NE of Le Roy | McLean | IL | 40.3839°N 88.7228°W | 01:18–01:20 | 2.44 mi (3.93 km) | 100 yd (91 m) |
| EF2 | A house had its attached garage and much of its roof ripped off, an outbuilding was damaged, and trees were snapped. | | | | | | |
| EF0 | SW of Ellsworth | McLean | IL | 40.4102°N 88.7671°W | 01:21–01:22 | 0.12 mi (0.19 km) | 25 yd (23 m) |
| EF0 | A metal outbuilding had one of its walls blown out. | | | | | | |
| EF1 | W of Colfax | McLean | IL | 40.5656°N 88.6713°W | 01:42–01:44 | 0.49 mi (0.79 km) | 75 yd (69 m) |
| EF1 | Outbuildings were destroyed and trees were damaged. | | | | | | |

=== December 2 event ===
List of confirmed tornadoes – Sunday, December 2, 2018
| EF# | Location | County / Parish | State | Start Coord. | Time (UTC) | Path length | Max width |
|---|---|---|---|---|---|---|---|
| EF1 | NW of Terrell | Worth | GA | 31.6445°N 83.831°W | 07:46–07:49 | 1.48 mi (2.38 km) | 350 yd (320 m) |
| EF1 | Outbuildings suffered significant damage, a few manufactured homes sustained minor damage, and numerous trees were snapped or uprooted. | | | | | | |
| EF0 | W of Dothan | Houston | AL | 31.2374°N 85.4872°W | 07:49–07:51 | 1.03 mi (1.66 km) | 75 yd (69 m) |
| EF0 | Several dozen trees were snapped or uprooted. Fences were damaged, a power pole was snapped, a couple of homes suffered roof damage, and a car was flipped over. | | | | | | |
| EF0 | W of Omega | Tift | GA | 31.339°N 83.6184°W | 14:22–14:28 | 1.86 mi (2.99 km) | 600 yd (550 m) |
| EF0 | Irrigation systems, trees, and a substation sustained some damage. | | | | | | |
| EF0 | SE of Willacoochee | Atkinson | GA | 31.2925°N 83.0196°W | 19:14–19:15 | 3.2 mi (5.1 km) | 50 yd (46 m) |
| EF0 | Tree tops were snapped. | | | | | | |
| EF0 | Pearson | Atkinson | GA | 31.31°N 82.86°W | 19:30–19:31 | 0.19 mi (0.31 km) | 50 yd (46 m) |
| EF0 | A home security camera videoed a tornado that caused minor damage to the property. | | | | | | |
| EF1 | Colonels Island | Glynn | GA | 31.13°N 81.56°W | 19:40–19:49 | 0.59 mi (0.95 km) | 80 yd (73 m) |
| EF1 | A few dozen trees were damaged or snapped. | | | | | | |
| EF3 | Naval Submarine Base Kings Bay | Camden | GA | 30.78°N 81.55°W | 20:10–20:20 | 7.09 mi (11.41 km) | 900 yd (820 m) |
| EF3 | A large, strong tornado struck the Naval Submarine Base Kings Bay, throwing and damaging heavy metal brows, vehicles, metal storage containers, and utility trailers. Metal railings were twisted, power poles were downed, and a large crane on a barge was torn loose from its moorings. Numerous trees were snapped on Cumberland Island before the tornado exited into the Atlantic Ocean. A wind gust of 144 mph (232 km/h) was measured by a docked Coast Guard vessel as the tornado struck the base. Four people were injured, including two sailors that were thrown from a boat into the water. | | | | | | |
| EF0 | S of Hopkins | Ware | GA | 30.6911°N 82.3895°W | 23:48–23:49 | 1.4 mi (2.3 km) | 50 yd (46 m) |
| EF0 | A debris ball signature on radar confirmed a tornado. | | | | | | |

=== Blackgum–Welling–Proctor, Oklahoma ===
Blackgum–Welling–Proctor, Oklahoma
Meteorological history
- Formed: November 30, 2018, 9:43 p.m. CST (UTC-06:00)
- Dissipated: November 30, 2018, 10:46 p.m. CST (UTC-06:00)
- Duration: 1 hour, 3 minutes

EF2 tornado
- on the Enhanced Fujita scale
- Highest winds: 125 mph (201 km/h)

Overall effects
- Casualties: 5 injuries

This was the first strong (EF2+) tornado to occur during the outbreak. The long tracked tornado first touched down near Blackgum in Sequoyah County, where multiple homes were damaged. Multiple barns and outbuildings were destroyed, and several trees were snapped. The tornado continued into Cherokee County near an inlet of Lake Tenkiller where boat docks, lake homes, boats, and outbuildings were destroyed, and trees and power poles were snapped. The tornado moved north-northeast along the eastern shores of Lake Tenkiller, passing through Cookson and Cherokee Landing State Park. Numerous homes were damaged or destroyed. Other major damage included the destruction of numerous boat docks, boats, and outbuildings. Many trees and power poles were snapped, and hangars at the airport west of Cookson were destroyed. From Lake Tenkiller, the tornado continued to move north-northeast across less populated areas of southeastern Cherokee County where a few homes were damaged, outbuildings were destroyed, and trees were snapped or uprooted. The tornado moved into Adair County southwest of Wauhillau and moved north-northeast across Highway 51 and the E768 Road. A couple homes were damaged, outbuildings were damaged, and trees were uprooted. The tornado moved back into Cherokee County northwest of Wauhillau. After moving back into Cherokee County, it would briefly snap several trees before crossing back into Adair County shortly after.

After moving back into Adair County, the tornado would cross south-southwest of Proctor, and moved north-northeast and would continue to snap and uproot several trees. The tornado then crossed Highway 62 near Proctor where several homes were severely damaged, and large outbuildings were destroyed. Farm equipment was thrown large distances and many trees were snapped and uprooted. It snapped and uprooted numerous trees and destroyed barns between Highway 62 and Chewey Road. The tornado continued to move north-northeast across heavily wooded terrain and then crossed River Road where numerous trees were uprooted. The tornado then continued into Delaware County southwest of Dripping Springs and Natural Falls State Park, where more trees were uprooted. The tornado tracked north-northeast damaging a few homes, destroying a couple outbuildings, and snapping and uprooting trees as it crossed Highway 412. It dissipated southeast of Colcord.

In total, this tornado injured 5 people, and caused $1.965 million in property damage.

=== Morrisonville–Taylorville, Illinois ===
Morrisonville–Taylorville, Illinois
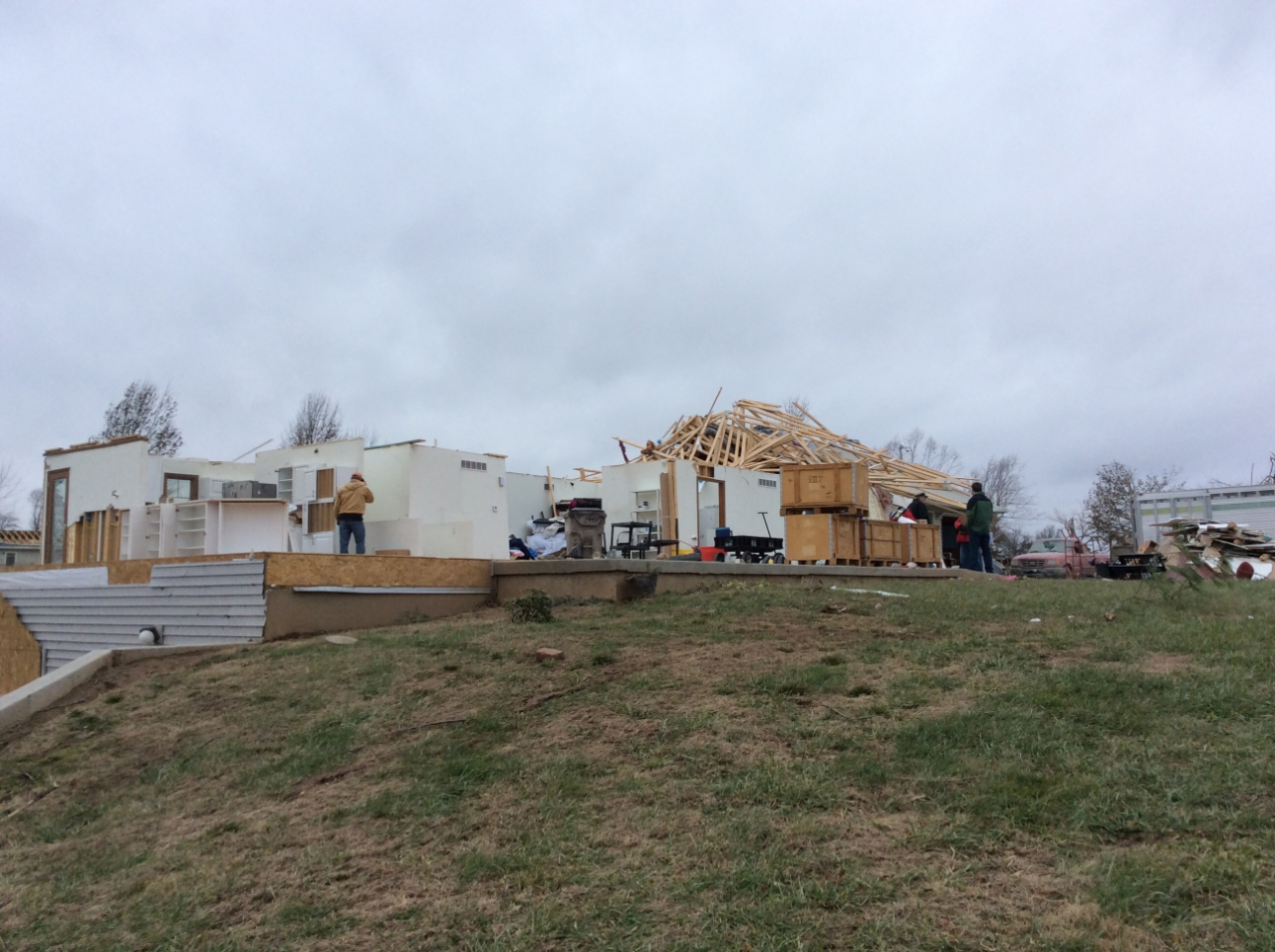
- EF3 damage to a home in Taylorville

Meteorological history
- Formed: December 1, 2018, 5:01 p.m. CST (UTC-06:00)
- Dissipated: December 1, 2018, 5:25 p.m. CST (UTC-06:00)
- Duration: 24 minutes

EF3 tornado
- on the Enhanced Fujita scale
- Highest winds: 155 mph (249 km/h)

Overall effects
- Casualties: 22 injuries

This intense EF3 rated tornado first touched down 3.2 miles (5.1 km) southwest of Morrisonville at 5:01 p.m. CST. The tornado hit a farmstead, destroying 3 barns and severely damaging 4 other outbuildings. The tornado caused EF2 damage in this area. The tornado continued northeastward, hitting several other outbuildings and snapping several more trees, before hitting a log home, and ripping away part of the roof. It also destroyed several outbuildings near the log home, throwing the debris northward into a field. The tornado continued northeastward and moved into a wooded area, snapping and uprooting hundreds of trees along its path. It then curved north-northeastward and moved into Hewittville, a small community on the southern edge of Taylorville. Here the tornado destroyed or severely damaged multiple houses. The first house the tornado hit lost most exterior walls and the entire roof, except for the roof over the attached garage, which was on the north side of the house. It also destroyed a second garage on the property and then completely destroyed a mobile home across the street. The tornado continued north-northeastward, destroying a barn, pushing an unanchored home off its foundation and completely destroying another mobile home. This mobile home was partially anchored by wood posts set in slots on a concrete foundation over a basement and crawl space. The resident of this home was badly injured and was found unconscious, trapped under debris in the crawl space. As the tornado continued, it snapped and uprooted many more trees and took down power lines and power poles. Many more homes were damaged, to a lesser extent than the first few on the south end of town, with some damage to the homes coming from trees or tree branches falling on the homes. As the tornado moved into the northern part of Hewittville, the wind speeds seemed to increase, completely destroying another home and destroying a large, old building that had been part of an old rail-yard. The tornado also damaged other homes and garages in this area. As the tornado tracked north-northeastward, it moved into Taylorville, taking down more trees, power lines/poles, and damaging multiple houses. Several homes lost roofs and garages. The tornado continued through Taylorville damaging other homes and several businesses on West Spresser St. As the tornado crossed Hwy 29 into the northern part of town, it weakened considerably, with the damage becoming less severe and more sporadic. The tornado dissipated 1.8 miles (2.9 km) north of Taylorville at 5:25 p.m. CST.

In total, the tornado impacted 506 structures including major damage to 61 homes and 7 businesses and complete destruction of 28 homes. Total damage was estimated at $118.9 million, and a total 22 people were injured by the tornado.

== See also ==
- Tornadoes of 2018
- List of United States tornadoes from August to October 2018
