= Corzine =

Corzine is a surname. Notable people with the surname include:

- Amy Corzine, American writer
- Dave Corzine (born 1956), basketball player
- Jon Corzine (born 1947), former CEO of MF Global, former Governor on New Jersey, former CEO of Goldman Sachs
- Red Corzine (1909–2003), American football player
- Roy A. Corzine (1882–1957), Illinois state representative and farmer
