= Joe Kayser =

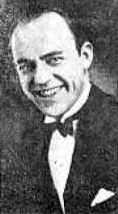
- Born: September 14, 1891; St. Louis, Missouri, US
- Died: October 3, 1981 (aged 90); Evanston, Illinois, US
- Occupation(s): Drummer, bandleader

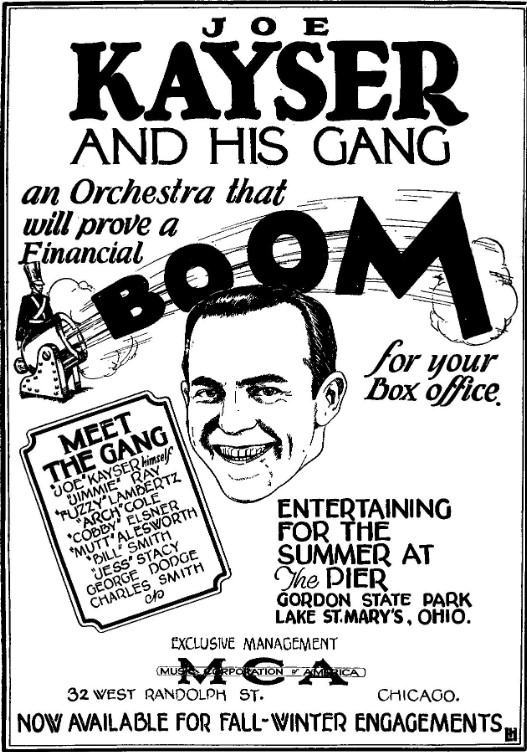
1926 advertisement

Joe Kayser (September 14, 1891 – October 3, 1981) was an American drummer and dance bandleader.

== Musical history ==
In 1917, Kayser relocated to New York City to join Earl Fuller's band, which played at a restaurant called Rector's. He enlisted in the U.S. Navy during World War I, forming a band which included Benny Kubelsky on violin. Following the war, the Meyer Davis Organization hired him to lead a dance band which played in North and South Carolina.

He formed his own self-named dance jazz band in 1921. Shortly after the formation, he attempted to tour across North Carolina and South Carolina. From 1924 to 1936, his band performed in Chicago.

Starting in 1929, Kayser began taking positions as musical director of theater orchestras - first the Diversey Theater, in Chicago, and then the Midland Theatre, in Kansas City. He continued to tour with his orchestra while holding these positions. He played at the 1933 World's Fair, accompanying Sally Rand. He dissolved the band in 1936 to work for NBC, and then became an executive for MCA in 1943, remaining there until his retirement in 1955.
