= Lloyd Ingles =

American zoologist

- Born: Lloyd Glenn Ingles; March 28, 1901; Camden, Illinois, U.S.
- Died: October 4, 1981 (aged 80); Pebble Beach, California, U.S.
- Education: University of Redlands; Claremont College; University of California, Berkeley
- Occupation: Zoologist

Lloyd Glenn Ingles (March 28, 1901 – October 4, 1981) was an American zoologist. He was a professor at Chico State College and Fresno State University.

In 1934, Ingles was named a fellow of the American Association for the Advancement of Science.

Ingles died on October 4, 1981, in Pebble Beach, California, at the age of 80.
