= Stonington, Illinois =

Stonington Village of Stonington
- Village
- Nickname: "Home of the Wildcats"
- Location of Stonington in Christian County, Illinois.
- Coordinates: 39°38′19″N 89°11′31″W
- Country: United States
- State: Illinois
- County: Christian

Area
  - Total: 0.46 sq mi (1.18 km^{2})
  - Land: 0.46 sq mi (1.18 km^{2})
  - Water: 0 sq mi (0.00 km^{2})
- Elevation: 614 ft (187 m)

Population (2020)
  - Total: 837
  - Density: 1,830.3/sq mi (706.68/km^{2})
- Time zone: UTC-6 (CST)
  - Summer (DST): UTC-5 (CDT)
- ZIP code: 62567
- Area code: 217
- FIPS code: 17-72949
- GNIS ID: 2399910
- Website: www.villageofstonington.com

Stonington is a village in Christian County, Illinois, United States. The population was 837 at the 2020 census.

== History ==
=== 2018 tornado ===
On December 1, 2018, an EF2 tornado struck the western part of the village; there were no injuries or deaths.

== Geography ==
According to the 2021 census gazetteer files, Stonington has a total area of 0.46 square miles (1.19 km^{2}), all land.

== Demographics ==
Historical population
Census	Pop.	Note	%±
1880	137		—
1890	270		97.1%
1900	438		62.2%
1910	1,118		155.3%
1920	1,466		31.1%
1930	1,057		−27.9%
1940	1,103		4.4%
1950	1,120		1.5%
1960	1,076		−3.9%
1970	1,096		1.9%
1980	1,184		8.0%
1990	1,006		−15.0%
2000	960		−4.6%
2010	932		−2.9%
2020	837		−10.2%
U.S. Decennial Census

As of the 2020 census there were 837 people, 317 households, and 181 families residing in the village. The population density was 1,831.51 inhabitants per square mile (707.15/km^{2}). There were 395 housing units at an average density of 864.33 per square mile (333.72/km^{2}). The racial makeup of the village was 93.79% White, 0.36% African American, 0.12% Native American, 0.12% Asian, 0.12% Pacific Islander, 0.24% from other races, and 5.26% from two or more races. Hispanic or Latino of any race were 1.43% of the population.

There were 317 households, out of which 22.4% had children under the age of 18 living with them, 41.96% were married couples living together, 11.04% had a female householder with no husband present, and 42.90% were non-families. 38.49% of all households were made up of individuals, and 17.98% had someone living alone who was 65 years of age or older. The average household size was 2.82 and the average family size was 2.12.

The village's age distribution consisted of 18.9% under the age of 18, 4.2% from 18 to 24, 28.2% from 25 to 44, 27.3% from 45 to 64, and 21.5% who were 65 years of age or older. The median age was 44.3 years. For every 100 females, there were 97.4 males. For every 100 females aged 18 and over, there were 98.5 males.

The median income for a household in the village was $56,094, and the median income for a family was $74,531. Males had a median income of $48,750 versus $37,500 for females. The per capita income for the village was $30,187. About 12.2% of families and 8.8% of the population were below the poverty line, including 11.0% of those under age 18 and 17.4% of those age 65 or over.

== Notable people ==
- Roy A. Corzine (1882–1957), Illinois state representative and farmer; born in Stonington
- Earl Bunn Fuller (1885–1947), ragtime and early jazz bandleader, composer and instrumentalist was born in Stonington.
