= Earl Fuller =

American ragtime and jazz bandleader, composer and instrumentalist (1885–1947)

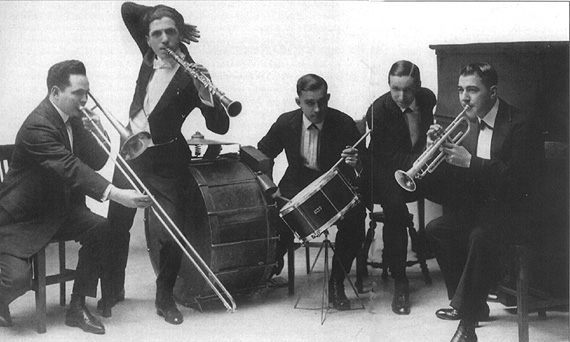
Earl Fuller's Famous Jazz Band in 1918. Left to Right: Harry Raderman, Ted Lewis, John Lucas, Earl Fuller, and Walter Kahn.

Earl Bunn Fuller (March 7, 1885 – August 19, 1947) was a pioneering American ragtime and early jazz bandleader, composer, and instrumentalist. Fuller helped to initiate the popularity of jazz in New York City shortly before America's entry into World War I. He also had an ear for talent and discovered Ted Lewis and Teddy Brown.

== Biography ==
Fuller was born on March 7, 1885 in Stonington, Illinois; however, his family had longstanding ties to Warren County, Ohio. Practically nothing is known of his musical education, but he was proficient on several instruments. Photos of his jazz band show him seated at the piano, and he is also credited with playing trumpet and trombone in his Novelty Orchestra; other accounts identify him as a drummer. Fuller was hired in 1913 as musical director of Rector's Restaurant on Broadway in Manhattan's theater district, which was established as a place where famous personalities from the New York Stage rubbed shoulders with politicians and other prominent New Yorkers. Fuller's Novelty Orchestra's star attraction was xylophonist Teddy Brown, then just a teenager and later destined for far greater fame in Britain. However, a Christmas ad placed in Variety on December 28, 1917, shows that Fuller also used George Hamilton Green in this role.

According to an unpublished autobiography by Ted Lewis, Lewis and his "clown band" was playing at the boardwalk at Coney Island; this was a group that had evolved from a circus band and included cornetist Walter Kahn, trombonist Harry Raderman, and drummer John Lucas; at that time the "clown band" did not have a pianist. Fuller approached Lewis's clown band and offered to hire them into Rector's. The contract they signed in April 1917 still survives and shows that what became "Earl Fuller's Famous Jazz Band" was signed, as a whole, into Rector's at one time. Trading in their clown costumes for tuxedos, Fuller's Jazz Band was an immediate success, and it began appearing at Rector's just a few months after the Original Dixieland Jazz Band made its acclaimed debut at Reisenweber's Cafe in January 1917. The Novelty Orchestra—playing rags, schottisches, waltzes, polkas, and two-steps—alternated sets with the more raucous jazz band. While the jazz band was exciting, only the bravest dancers could contend with its tempo. The resulting show was a successful balance between the revolutionary rhythm of jazz and more sedate material that was friendlier to dancers. According to the 1917 Christmas ad, Fuller also maintained two other groups, his "Celebrated Society Orchestra" and "Earl Fuller's Combination Seven," but of these only the first group is known on recordings through a single Victor side.

The Novelty Orchestra recorded for the first time for Columbia on June 1, 1917, and the jazz band three days later for Victor. Fuller's groups remained busy in the recording studios through February 1919, recording for Victor, Columbia, Edison, Emerson, and Starr/Gennett. There is some controversy as to whether Fuller functioned as pianist in the jazz band; some sources contend that the pianist in the Earl Fuller Famous Jazz Band was actually Ernest Cutting. However, the Victor ledgers show Fuller as pianist, at least on sides made for that company; Cutting did play with the Famous Jazz Band in live engagements, however. Likewise, Fuller's authorship has been challenged for five Fuller Jazz Band titles credited to Fuller as composer. However, Fuller did publish sheet music that he had written, and Lewis in his autobiography makes no such claim.

Lewis has taken some criticism over his handling of the matter of extracting himself from Rector's and Fuller's control, which included the whole of the Fuller Jazz Band, minus Fuller. In his autobiography, Lewis recalled that by mid-1919 he was being offered outrageous sums of money by Florenz Ziegfeld to play the Roof Garden of the New Amsterdam Theater. Neither Lewis nor his fellow jazz band members were paid more than other musicians at Rector's, and when his contract came up, he opted not to renew. The band simply left Fuller along with Lewis, including pianist Ernest Cutting. However, Cutting returned to Fuller after only about a month, and Cutting's composition Jazology was featured on the last recording credited to Earl Fuller's Famous Jazz Band, made in December 1919. This disc was issued both on Arto and as a special "Earl Fuller Record" with Fuller's picture on the label; the latter is one of the rarest of all early jazz records.

Jazology was one of 15 pieces compiled in Earl Fuller's Collection of Classic Jazz, published by a cooperative that Fuller headed called the American Musicians Syndicate with offices at 1604 Broadway. The collection was available both as a piano folio and as a set of orchestral parts arranged by Harry L. Alford, whom Fuller brought from Chicago to make the arrangements; among other pieces in the collection were early works composed by future band leaders Lou Gold and Irving Aaronson. The folios were issued in conjunction with three QRS piano roll medleys consisting of nine pieces from the set.

With the final passage of the Volstead Act (prohibiting the production, sale, and transport of "intoxicating liquors") in October 1919, rather than to continue as a restaurant without a liquor license, Rector's opted to close its doors. After making the final Earl Fuller Famous Jazz Band disc, Fuller took his bands on a coast to coast tour of vaudeville houses in the United States. Variety stated in his obituary that Fuller therefore "was the first big time orchestra leader to invade the hinterland." On returning to New York, Fuller renamed his band "Earl Fuller's New York Orchestra" and established a dance band booking agency, primarily run by his wife, Katherine. While Fuller's band halted its recording activities in 1921, the booking agency continued in New York until at least 1925. By 1928, Fuller had relocated to Cincinnati to continue the business there, but it ultimately foundered. Afterward, Fuller served as manager of WFBF radio in Cincinnati.

When he died of a heart attack in Morrow, Ohio, on August 19, 1947, Fuller was working as a real estate agent in nearby Lebanon. He was buried in Morrow Cemetery near to, but not in, the Fuller family plot.

== Legacy ==
Outside of enthusiasts of early jazz and vintage record collectors, Fuller is a forgotten figure. He has not been regarded well by mainstream jazz experts; Gunther Schuller's evaluation of the Fuller Band in the seminal survey Early Jazz was couched in mostly negative terms. However, there are listeners who are attracted to the "crude sort of excitement" that Schuller also alludes to, and overall their recordings are more violent and chaotic sounding than even the Original Dixieland Jazz Band. Some post-modern scholars refer to it as "punk jazz," a kind of early jazz with a nihilistic aesthetic akin to the 1970s punk rock movement in England. The one inescapable factor of Fuller's legacy is that he played a major role in popularizing jazz in New York City; Lewis' "clown band" may have been one of the first groups to play something that could be regarded as instrumental jazz in New York, and by incorporating their act into his high-profile show at Rector's, Fuller exposed the new sound to the very clientele that would take to it most. Moreover, like the Original Dixieland Jazz Band, Fuller's groups were among the first to record pieces that have become standards, such as W. C. Handy's Beale Street Blues.

In addition to Ted Lewis, Teddy Brown, and George Hamilton Green, musicians who worked in Fuller's various groups included Sig Behrendson (who sometimes filled in for Raderman), Willie Creager, Ben Selvin, Joe Green, Joe Kayser, Joseph Samuels, and Ted Weems. Variety states that of the band Fuller took on tour of the United States "many of the men later formed the basis of the late Ben Bernie's first stage band."

== Discography ==
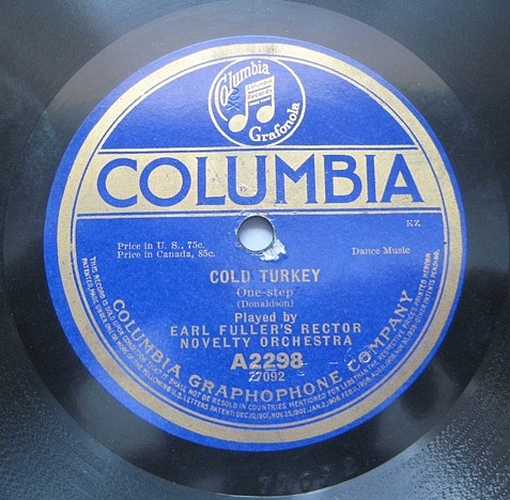
Earl Fuller's first record, "Cold Turkey"

Fuller made an impressive number of recordings in a very short time. The table below contains all known Earl Fuller recordings, minus non-U.S. issues; some undocumented items may have also been issued on Olympic, Arto, or Starr/Gennett, labels incompletely documented in this period. Edison Blue Amberol cylinders are generally identical to the Diamond Disc issues, though takes may vary. Victor 18395 was announced but ultimately not released. Fuller is also credited as a director and/or manager on some Pathé recordings by Joseph Samuels' Orchestra, but his connection to these items remains uncertain.

| Artist Credit | Title | Date | Label | Issue | Matrix |
|---|---|---|---|---|---|
| Earl Fuller's Novelty Orchestra | Cold Turkey | 6-1-1917 | Columbia | A2298 | 77092-2 |
| Earl Fuller's Novelty Orchestra | 12th Street Rag | 6-1-1917 | Columbia | A2298 | 77093-7 |
| Earl Fuller's Famous Jazz Band | Slippery Hank | 6-4-1917 | Victor | 18321-A | B-20062-2 |
| Earl Fuller's Famous Jazz Band | Yah-de-dah | 6-4-1917 | Victor | 18321-B | B-20063-2 |
| Earl Fuller's Novelty Orchestra | Cold Turkey | 6-4-1917 | Victor | unissued | B-20064 |
| Earl Fuller's Novelty Orchestra | I Never Knew | 6-4-1917 | Victor | unissued | B-20065 |
| Earl Fuller's Novelty Orchestra | One Fleeting Hour | 6-9-1917 | Columbia | A5989 | 49235 |
| Earl Fuller's Novelty Orchestra | Castle Valse Classique | 6-9-1917 | Columbia | A5989 | 49236 |
| Earl Fuller's Novelty Orchestra | Pork and Beans | 7-20-1917 | Columbia | A2370 | 77220-3 |
| Earl Fuller's Famous Jazz Band | Jazzin' Around | 8-13-1917 | Victor | unissued | B-20502-1-4 |
| Earl Fuller's Famous Jazz Band | A Coon Band Contest | 8-13-1917 | Victor | unissued | B-20503-1-3 |
| Earl Fuller's Famous Jazz Band | The Old Grey Mare | 8-13-1917 | Victor | 18369-A | B-20504-2 |
| Earl Fuller's Famous Jazz Band | Beale Street Blues | 8-13-1917 | Victor | 18369-B | B-20505-2 |
| Earl Fuller's Novelty Orchestra | More Candy | 9-5-1917 | Columbia | A2403 | 77307-2 |
| Earl Fuller's Novelty Orchestra | Ida Sweet As Apple Cider | 9-5-1917 | Columbia | A2403 | 77308-2 |
| Earl Fuller's Famous Jazz Band | Jazzin' Around | 9-10-1917 | Victor | 18395-A | B-20502-5 |
| Earl Fuller's Famous Jazz Band | A Coon Band Contest | 9-10-1917 | Victor | 18394-A | B-20503-4 |
| Earl Fuller's Famous Jazz Band | L'il Liza Jane | 9-10-1917 | Victor | 18394-B | B-20549-3 |
| Earl Fuller's Famous Jazz Band | Cotton Blossoms | 9-10-1917 | Victor | 18395-B | B-20550-1 |
| Earl Fuller's Novelty Orchestra | Smiles | 11-17-1917 | Columbia | A2578 | 77516-2 |
| Earl Fuller's Orchestra | When the Incense is Burning | 11-19-1917 | Victor | 18450-B | B-21465-1 |
| Earl Fuller's Orchestra | Charming | 11-19-1917 | Victor | unissued | Vi trial |
| Earl Fuller's Orchestra | What Could Be Sweeter? | 11-19-1917 | Victor | unissued | Vi trial |
| Earl Fuller's Novelty Orchestra | Mama's Baby Boy | 12-18-1917 | Columbia | unissued | 77582 |
| Earl Fuller's Novelty Orchestra | Graveyard Blues | 3-1-1918 | Columbia | A2523 | 77583-3 |
| Earl Fuller's Novelty Orchestra | Sweet Emalina My Gal | 3-1-1918 | Columbia | A2523 | 77697-3 |
| Earl Fuller's Novelty Orchestra | I Ain't Got Nobody Much | 3-18-1918 | Columbia | A2547 | 77725-3 |
| Earl Fuller's Novelty Orchestra | Down Home Rag | 3-18-1918 | Columbia | A2547 | 77726-1 |
| Earl Fuller's Famous Jazz Band | Jazz De Luxe | 3-1918 | Emerson | 952 | 3182-1, -2 |
| Earl Fuller's Famous Jazz Band | Jazzbo Jazz | 3-1918 | Emerson | 952 | 3183-1, -2 |
| Earl Fuller's Famous Jazz Band | Jazzbo Jazz | 3-1918 | Medallion | 817 | 3183 |
| Earl Fuller's Famous Jazz Band | Jazz De Luxe | 3-1918 | Medallion | 818 | 3182 |
| Earl Fuller's Novelty Orchestra | Mickey | 5-3-1918 | Columbia | A2595 | 77806-1 |
| Earl Fuller's Novelty Orchestra | We'll Do Our Share | 5-7-1918 | Columbia | A2566 | 77815-2 |
| Earl Fuller's Novelty Orchestra | I Want Him Back Again | 5-7-1918 | Columbia | A2566 | 77816-2 |
| Earl Fuller's Novelty Orchestra | The Missouri Waltz | 5-14-1918 | Columbia | A2578 | 77821-2 |
| Earl Fuller's Novelty Orchestra | Here Comes America | 5-1918 | Columbia | A2595 | 77838-2 |
| Earl Fuller's Novelty Orchestra | When I Feel Sad and Lonely | 6-3-1918 | Columbia | unissued | 49439 |
| Earl Fuller's Novelty Orchestra | Texas - Fox Trot | 6-3-1918 | Columbia | A6075 | 49440-1 |
| Earl Fuller's Novelty Orchestra | Oriental - One Step | 7-1918 | Columbia | A6075 | 49474-1 |
| Earl Fuller's Famous Jazz Band | I'm Sorry I Made You Cry | 6-4-1918 | Edison Blue Amberol | 3585 | 6198-C |
| Earl Fuller's Famous Jazz Band | I'm Sorry I Made You Cry | 6-4-1918 | Edison Diamond Disc | 50521-L | 6198-A-B-C |
| Earl Fuller's Famous Jazz Band | Jazzbo Jazz - One Step | 6-4-1918 | Edison Blue Amberol | 3554 | 6199-C |
| Earl Fuller's Famous Jazz Band | Jazzbo Jazz - One Step | 6-4-1918 | Edison Diamond Disc | 50505-L | 6199-C |
| Earl Fuller's Famous Jazz Band | Jazz De Luxe | 6-13-1918 | Edison Blue Amberol | 3610 | 6005-C |
| Earl Fuller's Famous Jazz Band | Jazz De Luxe | 6-13-1918 | Edison Diamond Disc | 50541-R | 6005-C |
| Earl Fuller's Famous Jazz Band | Jazzin' Around | 6-13-1918 | Edison Blue Amberol | 3572 | 6225-C |
| Earl Fuller's Novelty Orchestra | Howdy | 8-6-1918 | Columbia | A2649 | 77987 |
| Earl Fuller's Famous Jazz Band | Cold Turkey | 8-1918 | Gennett | 8504-B | 1334 |
| Earl Fuller's Famous Jazz Band | I'm Sorry I Made You Cry | 8-1918 | Gennett | 8504-A | 1335 |
| Earl Fuller's Famous Jazz Band | Unknown Selection | 8-1918 | Gennett | unknown | 1336 |
| Earl Fuller's Famous Jazz Band | Jazz De Luxe | 8-1918 | Gennett | 8522-B | 1337 |
| Earl Fuller's Novelty Orchestra | Russian Rag | 8-30-1918 | Columbia | A2649 | 78034 |
| Earl Fuller's Novelty Orchestra | Sand Dunes | 8-30-1918 | Columbia | unissued (12") | 49488 |
| Earl Fuller's Novelty Orchestra | Singapore | 12-10-1918 | Columbia | A2686 | 78194-3 |
| Earl Fuller's Novelty Orchestra | Out of the East | 12-10-1918 | Columbia | A2686 | 78195-3 |
| Earl Fuller's Novelty Orchestra | Sand Dunes | 12-19-1918 | Columbia | A2697 | 78195-3 |
| Earl Fuller's Novelty Orchestra | Spaniola | 12-19-1918 | Columbia | A2697 | 78195-3 |
| Earl Fuller's Novelty Orchestra | Egyptland | 1-31-1919 | Columbia | A2722 | 78280-2 |
| Earl Fuller's Novelty Orchestra | Mummy Mine | 1-31-1919 | Columbia | A2722 | 78281-2 |
| Earl Fuller's Novelty Orchestra | Ruspana | 2-21-1919 | Columbia | A2712 | 78310-2 |
| Earl Fuller's Novelty Orchestra | Sweet Siamese | 2-21-1919 | Columbia | A2712 | 78311-3 |
| Earl Fuller's Famous Jazz Band | Jazorient | 12-1919 | Arto/Earl Fuller | 9009-A | 31001- |
| Earl Fuller's Famous Jazz Band | Jazzology | 12-1919 | Arto/Earl Fuller | 9009-B | 31002-2 |
| Earl Fuller's New York Orchestra | Ain't We Got Fun | 5-1921 | Olympic | 15116-A | |
| Earl Fuller's New York Orchestra | Ain't We Got Fun | 5-1921 | Symphony Concert Record | 21180-A | |
| Earl Fuller's New York Orchestra | Just Because | 5-1921 | Olympic | 15116-B | |
| Earl Fuller's New York Orchestra | Just Because | 5-1921 | Symphony Concert Record | 21180-B | |
| Earl Fuller's New York Orchestra | Melody in F | 5-1921 | Olympic | 15118 | |
| Earl Fuller's New York Orchestra | Melody in F | 5-1921 | Black Swan | 2058-B | |
| Earl Fuller's New York Orchestra | Just Because | 6-17-1921 | Edison Diamond Disc | 50824-R | 8076 |
| Earl Fuller's New York Orchestra | I Wonder Where My Sweet, Sweet Daddy's Gone | 6-17-1921 | Edison Blue Amberol | 4392 | 8077-A |
| Earl Fuller's New York Orchestra | I Wonder Where My Sweet, Sweet Daddy's Gone | 6-17-1921 | Edison Diamond Disc | 50824-L | 8077-A |

== Reissues ==
Reissues of Earl Fuller recordings in modern formats are almost unknown. A notable, early departure from this state of affairs was the work of Dutch black music authority Dr. Hans Rookmaaker, who included two Earl Fuller selections on his 1961 collection New York Jazz Scene: 1917-1920 which was the first volume in his series "Classic Jazz Masters" for Dutch Philips. Fuller is also included by virtue of two tracks on John R.T. Davies' Ragtime to Jazz I and one on Archeophone's Real Ragtime.
