= Roy A. Corzine =

American farmer and politician

Member of the Illinois House of Representatives
- In office 1927–1933

Personal details
- Born: Roy Allen Corzine; December 22, 1882 Stonington, Illinois
- Died: June 2, 1957 (aged 74) Taylorville, Illinois
- Party: Republican
- Spouse: Adah Florence (Drake) Corzine
- Relations: Jon Corzine (grandson)
- Children: 4
- Education: University of Illinois
- Profession: Farmer, politician

Roy Allen Corzine, Sr. (December 22, 1882 – June 2, 1957) was an American farmer and politician.

== Biography ==
Corzine was born in Stonington, Illinois and attended public schools in Stonington. He attended the University of Illinois and took agriculture courses. Corzine previously worked as a farmer. Corzine served on the board of education for the Stonington Community High School. He went on to serve in the Illinois House of Representatives from 1927 to 1933 and was a Republican. Corzine died at St. Vincent's Hospital in Taylorville, Illinois after suffering from a long illness. His grandson, Jon Corzine, is a businessman who served as Governor of New Jersey and in the United States Senate. Through his wife, Adah Florence (Drake) Corzine, Roy Corzine was related to Robert Burdick, a settler of Rhode Island.
