= List of Washington (state) tornadoes =

Tornadoes in the U.S. State of Washington

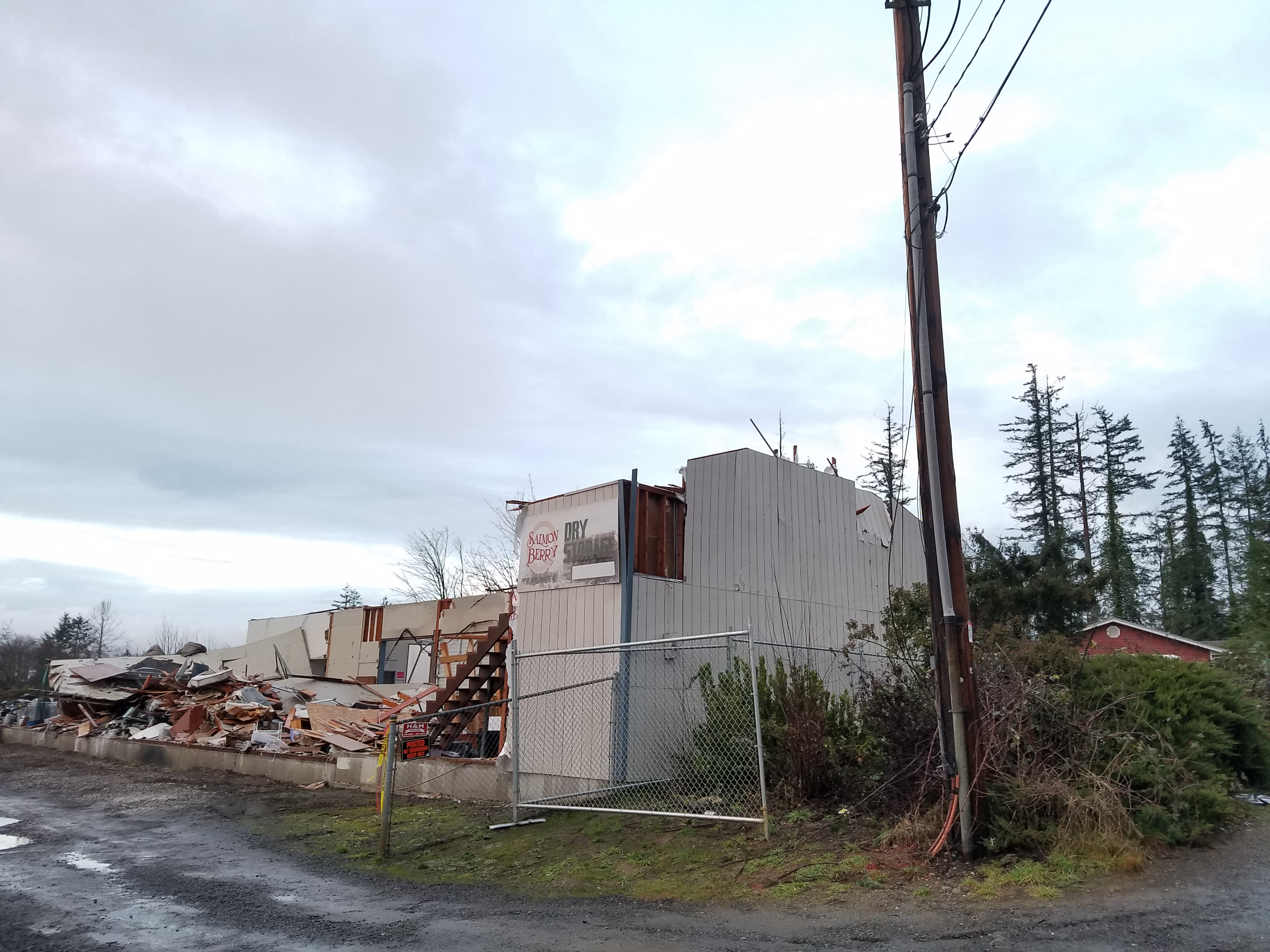
Damage from a rare EF2 tornado that hit Port Orchard on December 18, 2018.

Tornadoes in the U.S. State of Washington are rare, with an average of 2–3 tornadoes touching down within state boundaries annually.

== Climatology ==
While not as common as east of the Rockies, tornadoes do occur in Washington state. Tornadoes can occur any time of year in Washington but most commonly occur in April, May and June. Tornadoes in Washington state can suddenly happen and then stop after a short time. Due to the state's landscape, they usually don't last very long and the vast majority are relatively weak.

== Events ==
=== Pre-1950 ===
- June 26, 1916 – A brief but relatively strong F2 tornado touched down near Walla Walla, causing an unknown amount of damage to structures.
- December 23, 1949 – A waterspout came ashore on Long Beach, becoming an F2 tornado. The tornado damaged a barn, and a home lost its roof.

=== 1950–1959 ===
- October 2, 1951 – An F2 tornado struck Clark and was on the ground for at least 30 minutes, a barn was destroyed and fruit trees were uprooted. The tornado caused $10,000 in damage.
- June 15, 1954 – A weak F2 tornado touched down near Spokane and Fairfield, causing damage to trees.
- May 9, 1956 – A long-tracked F0 tornado moved through the southern portions of Kennewick, causing minor damage to structures and trees.
- May 6, 1957 – A weak F0 tornado briefly touched down in a forest near Spokane, causing no damage. An F1 tornado, spawned by the same storm, briefly touched down further east of Spokane, causing damage to trees but injuring none.
- April 24, 1958 – A weak F0 tornado moved through areas around Kennewick, causing minor damage to crops and roads.
- June 26, 1958 – A brief F2 tornado formed over a lake near Finley. No injuries were reported, and this tornado may have been a waterspout.

=== 1960–1969 ===
- May 22, 1964 – A brief F0 tornado moved through rural areas near Cheney, causing minor damage to crops.
- August 18, 1964 – A weak F0 tornado moved through suburban areas of Seattle, causing damage to structures and trees.
- November 10, 1965 – A strong F2 tornado touched down outside of Centralia, heavily damaging a barn but causing no other heavy damage.
- March 14, 1966 – A brief F2 tornado touched down near Houser, causing no significant damage.
- December 12, 1969 – A long-tracked F3 tornado moved through metropolitan Seattle, causing extensive damage to the neighborhood of White Center and injuring one person.

=== 1970–1979 ===
- June 29, 1970 – A brief F0 tornado touched down near Spokane, causing no damage.
- November 24, 1970 – An F2 tornado tracked through rural areas near Marysville, causing tree damage but injuring none.
- August 30, 1971 – An F2 tornado touched down near Colfax, causing an unknown amount of damage.
- December 22, 1971 – A brief F0 tornado touched down on or near the coast of Des Moines, causing no damage. This tornado may have been a waterspout.
- April 5, 1972 – A strong F3 tornado tracked through Creston, causing minor damage to structures while injuring one person. The F3 rating was given due to the tornado uprooting trees, but weather researcher Thomas P. Grazulis rated the tornado as an F2. A brief F2 tornado touched down near Almira, causing an unknown amount of damage to trees and structures. Another brief F2 tornado tracked through areas and lakes near Kettle Falls, causing minor damage to trees. A large and extremely strong F3 tornado moved through the metropolitan area of Vancouver, destroying hundreds of structures and killing 6 people. The tornado injured another 300 before crossing the Washington-Oregon border into Portland, Oregon. While the tornado is officially rated as a F3, the tornado was rated as an F2 by Thomas P. Grazulis.
- July 17, 1978 – A brief but strong F2 tornado moved through Newport, Washington, causing tree damage.
- August 15, 1978 – A brief F1 tornado moved through areas near Almira, causing little damage.
- May 1, 1979 – A brief and weak F0 tornado touched down in Davenport, causing minor damage to structures and trees.
- July 1, 1979 – A small F0 tornado touched down over the Grant County International Airport, causing minor damage to aircraft.

=== 1980–1989 ===
- May 12, 1980 – An extremely weak F0 tornado hit Ritzville, causing no damage.
- August 14, 1980 – A brief F1 tornado touched down near Colville.
- June 22, 1981 – A short-tracked F1 tornado moved through areas near Deer Park, causing tree damage but no injuries.
- May 3, 1982 – A tornado tracked through Omak, inflicting F1 damage to various structures.
- April 23, 1983 – A long-tracked F1 tornado moved south of Mesa and Basin City, causing only minor damage to trees and barns. A brief F0 tornado touched down near Othello, causing no damage.
- July 25, 1983 – A brief F1 tornado touched down near Colville, damaging a house.
- October 17, 1983 – An F1 tornado moved through areas near Cheney and Spangle, causing minor damage to small structures.
- April 12, 1984 – A weak F1 tornado tracked through suburban areas north of Spokane, causing minor damage to houses and vehicles.
- October 13, 1984 – A long-tracked F1 tornado hit Woodland, causing damage to structures but injuring none.
- March 28, 1985 – A small and extremely brief F0 tornado hit the highway north of Rocky Point, causing only minor damage.
- August 10, 1985 – A brief F1 tornado hit Warden, causing minor damage to a vehicle before lifting.
- May 13, 1986 – A weak F2 tornado touched down near Arlington, causing damage to trees.
- May 30, 1987 – A brief F1 tornado touched down near Brewster and Washburn Island, causing no damage.
- June 29, 1989 – A brief but strong F1 tornado hit the northern portions of La Center, injuring one person.

=== 1990-1999 ===
- December 1, 1990 – An F0 tornado touched down in South Bend, causing minor damage to roofs and breaking windows.
- April 9, 1991 – A brief F0 tornado tracked through central Tracyton, causing little damage to buildings.
- July 4, 1992 – An F0 tornado moved through Waterville, causing damage to vehicles and power lines but injuring none.
- April 6, 1994 – A small and weak F0 tornado touched down near Spokane, causing no damage. Another brief F0 tornado touched down near Grand Mound, causing minor damage to barns.
- June 23, 1996 – A brief F0 tornado moved through the waters off the coast of Ruston, causing no damage. This tornado may have been a waterspout.
- May 31, 1997 – A long-tracked F1 tornado moved through Creston, causing only minor damage and injuring none. Another long-tracked tornado moved through Denison, inflicting F1 damage to a vehicle and damaging trees.
- July 21, 1997 – An F1 tornado hit Nespelem, causing minor damage to trees. Another brief F1 tornado moved south of Kettle Falls, causing only minor damage.
- September 15, 1997 – A brief F0 tornado moved through areas around Yacolt, causing no damage.
- April 27, 1999 – A relatively weak F0 tornado hit northern Spokane, causing minor damage to structures.
- May 9, 1999 – A weak F0 tornado tracked through rural areas around Selah, causing no damage.

=== 2000–2009 ===
- January 16, 2000 – A long-tracked F0 tornado moved through rural portions of Dayton, causing minor damage but no injuries.
- May 11, 2000 – An F0 tornado moved through Battleground in Clark County. Three houses had minor damage as did a restaurant (blew away a sign and some metal strips of the awning). A pickup canopy resting on sawhorses was blown about 100 feet. In addition, a section of wooden fence was blown down, and 2 to 4 inch limbs were broken off of a tree. No injuries were reported.
- May 15, 2000 – A brief and weak F0 tornado touched down outside of Zillah, causing very little damage, it mostly uprooted trees in people's backyards.
- June 11, 2001 – An extremely weak tornado inflicted F0 damage on Bainbridge Island, tossing an observer into the air but injuring none.
- June 27, 2001 – An F1 tornado tracked through Bonney Lake, causing minor damage to various structures.
- May 11, 2003 – A small F0 tornado touched down near Richland, causing no damage.
- October 15, 2003 – A weak F0 tornado hit Five Corners, downing power lines and damaging trees.
- May 27, 2004 – A brief F1 tornado tracked through areas south of Sunnydale, causing only minor damage to power lines and trees. A weak F0 tornado touched down near La Center, briefly causing damage before lifting.
- June 7, 2004 – A weak F0 tornado moved through uninhabited areas of southern Washington, causing no damage.
- April 23, 2005 – 2 twin F0 tornadoes moved through rural areas near Toppenish, causing only minor damage to trees.
- May 9, 2005 – A small and weak F0 tornado touched down near Yakima, causing no damage.
- January 28, 2006 – A small F0 tornado briefly touched down near Kellys Korner, causing no damage.
- June 16, 2006 – An extremely weak F0 tornado touched down northwest of Gold Bar, causing no damage.
- January 10, 2008 – An EF1 tornado moved through northern Vancouver, inflicting damage to houses and vehicles but injuring none.
- April 25, 2008 – A weak EF0 tornado briefly touched down near Kettle Falls, causing no damage.
- May 6, 2009 – A brief EF1 tornado moved through areas far north of Davenport, damaging 2 structures and uprooting trees.
- June 6, 2009 – 4 weak and brief EF0 tornados moved through rural areas near Creston, all of which only caused minor damage to trees and power lines.
- September 6, 2009 - An EF1 tornado touched down near Bonney Lake and moved northeast for 9.6 miles causing sporadic tree damage and destroying a barn.

=== 2010–2019 ===
- May 21, 2016 – A brief EF0 tornado touched down in downtown Kennewick before quickly dissipating, causing only minor damage to trees.
- December 18, 2018 – A rare EF2 tornado struck the city of Port Orchard, Washington, with most of the damage occurring near Salmonberry and Bethel Roads to the north of SR 160. Approximately 300 homes and businesses were damaged during the tornado, including one residence that had its roof completely ripped off. A strip mall had its roof torn away, a dry storage facility was demolished, and around $1.18 million (2018 USD) was inflicted in damage. The tornado was only the second ever recorded in Kitsap County, and the strongest tornado to touch down in Washington since 1986.

=== 2020–2026 ===
- March 31, 2020 – A brief EF0 landspout tornado touched down in an open area of north Richland. The tornado was captured on video and appeared to be quite weak. No damage was reported.
- March 25, 2021 – A brief EF0 tornado, likely a landspout, was spotted near the Road 68 area of Pasco. The tornado was captured on photo and video and appeared to be quite weak. No damage was reported.
- May 6, 2022 – 2 brief EF0 tornados occurred near Spokane. One in Spokane Valley caused minor damage, such as flipping a mobile home. The other tornado, north of Davenport, caused minor tree and power line damage.
- November 20, 2024 – A waterspout was spotted off of Long Beach. The waterspout was captured on photo and video. No damage was reported.
- April 15, 2026 – A rare waterspout was spotted moving through Puget Sound off the coast of Magnolia, Seattle. The waterspout was captured on photo and video. No damage was reported.
