= Midland, Tennessee =

Unincorporated community in Tennessee, US

Coordinates: 35°40′12″N 86°28′50″W

Midland is an unincorporated community in Rutherford County, in the U.S. state of Tennessee.

== History ==
A variant name was "Middleton". A post office called Middleton was established in 1832, and closed in 1870; a post office operated as Midland from 1886 until 1907. Besides the post office, the community contained a country store.
