= Camden, Illinois =

Camden
- Village
- Location of Camden in Schuyler County, Illinois.
- Coordinates: 40°09′10″N 90°46′24″W
- Country: United States
- State: Illinois
- County: Schuyler

Area
  - Total: 0.76 sq mi (1.97 km^{2})
  - Land: 0.76 sq mi (1.97 km^{2})
  - Water: 0 sq mi (0.00 km^{2})
- Elevation: 604 ft (184 m)

Population (2020)
  - Total: 62
  - Density: 81.4/sq mi (31.44/km^{2})
- Time zone: UTC-6 (CST)
  - Summer (DST): UTC-5 (CDT)
- Postal code: 62319
- Area code: 217
- FIPS code: 17-10695
- GNIS feature ID: 2397540

Camden is a village in Schuyler County, Illinois, United States. As of the 2020 census, Camden had a population of 62.

== History ==
Camden was originally surveyed and platted by Samuel McHatton on January 28, 1831. The first business was built in 1838 and a post office was erected in 1839. Camden was incorporated as a village in 1925.

== Geography ==
According to the 2010 census, Camden has a total area of 0.76 square miles (1.97 km^{2}), all land.

== Demographics ==
Historical population
Census	Pop.	Note	%±
1930	160		—
1940	157		−1.9%
1950	153		−2.5%
1960	116		−24.2%
1970	121		4.3%
1980	120		−0.8%
1990	115		−4.2%
2000	97		−15.7%
2010	86		−11.3%
2020	62		−27.9%
U.S. Decennial Census

As of the census of 2000, there were 97 people, 38 households, and 25 families residing in the village. The population density was 127.3 inhabitants per square mile (49.2/km^{2}). There were 40 housing units at an average density of 52.5 per square mile (20.3/km^{2}). The racial makeup of the village was 100.00% White.

There were 38 households, out of which 31.6% had children under the age of 18 living with them, 57.9% were married couples living together, 5.3% had a female householder with no husband present, and 31.6% were non-families. 28.9% of all households were made up of individuals, and 10.5% had someone living alone who was 65 years of age or older. The average household size was 2.55 and the average family size was 3.15.

In the village, the population was spread out, with 27.8% under the age of 18, 8.2% from 18 to 24, 30.9% from 25 to 44, 20.6% from 45 to 64, and 12.4% who were 65 years of age or older. The median age was 34 years. For every 100 females, there were 125.6 males. For every 100 females age 18 and over, there were 112.1 males.

The median income for a household in the village was $26,250, and the median income for a family was $34,375. Males had a median income of $20,556 versus $17,500 for females. The per capita income for the village was $9,981. There were 24.1% of families and 33.3% of the population living below the poverty line, including 33.3% of under eighteens and 11.1% of those over 65 years of age.

== Notable people ==
- Lloyd Ingles (1901–1981) – zoologist
