= Terrell, Georgia =

Unincorporated community in Georgia, United States

Coordinates: 31°37′4.65″N 83°44′43.62″W

Terrell is an unincorporated community in Worth County, in the U.S. state of Georgia.

== History ==
The community is named for Dr. William Terrell (1778–1855) of Sparta, Georgia, who served in the Georgia General Assembly and the United States House of Representatives.
