= Proctor, Oklahoma =

Unincorporated community in Oklahoma, US

Proctor, Oklahoma ᏓᎪᎲᏂ (Cherokee)
- Census-designated place
- Location within Adair County and the state of Oklahoma
- Coordinates: 36°00′13″N 94°45′01″W
- Country: United States
- State: Oklahoma
- County: Adair

Area
  - Total: 10.80 sq mi (27.97 km^{2})
  - Land: 10.71 sq mi (27.73 km^{2})
  - Water: 0.089 sq mi (0.23 km^{2})
- Elevation: 981 ft (299 m)

Population (2020)
  - Total: 180
  - Density: 16.8/sq mi (6.49/km^{2})
- Time zone: UTC-6 (Central (CST))
  - Summer (DST): UTC-5 (CDT)
- Zip code: 74457
- FIPS code: 40-60750
- GNIS feature ID: 2584390

Proctor (Cherokee: ᏓᎪᎲᏂ, romanized: Dagohvni) is a census-designated place (CDP) in Adair County, Oklahoma, United States. As of the 2020 census, Proctor had a population of 180.

== Geography ==
Proctor is located in the valley of the Baron Fork, a tributary of the Illinois River of Oklahoma. U.S. Route 62 runs through the center of the community, leading east 13 miles (21 km) to Westville and west 14 miles (23 km) to Tahlequah.

According to the United States Census Bureau, the CDP has a total area of 8.5 square miles (21.9 km^{2}), of which 8.4 square miles (21.8 km^{2}) is land and 0.077 square miles (0.2 km^{2}), or 0.77%, is water.

== Demographics ==
Historical population
| Census | Pop. | Note | %± |
|---|---|---|---|
| 2010 | 231 | | — |
| 2020 | 180 | | −22.1% |
U.S. Decennial Census

=== 2020 census ===
As of the 2020 census, Proctor had a population of 180. The median age was 36.5 years. 22.2% of residents were under the age of 18 and 27.2% of residents were 65 years of age or older. For every 100 females there were 68.2 males, and for every 100 females age 18 and over there were 70.7 males age 18 and over.

0.0% of residents lived in urban areas, while 100.0% lived in rural areas.

There were 67 households in Proctor, of which 35.8% had children under the age of 18 living in them. Of all households, 62.7% were married-couple households, 9.0% were households with a male householder and no spouse or partner present, and 19.4% were households with a female householder and no spouse or partner present. About 10.5% of all households were made up of individuals and 0.0% had someone living alone who was 65 years of age or older.

There were 94 housing units, of which 28.7% were vacant. The homeowner vacancy rate was 4.5% and the rental vacancy rate was 20.0%.

Racial composition as of the 2020 census
| Race | Number | Percent |
|---|---|---|
| White | 67 | 37.2% |
| Black or African American | 0 | 0.0% |
| American Indian and Alaska Native | 80 | 44.4% |
| Asian | 0 | 0.0% |
| Native Hawaiian and Other Pacific Islander | 0 | 0.0% |
| Some other race | 1 | 0.6% |
| Two or more races | 32 | 17.8% |
| Hispanic or Latino (of any race) | 4 | 2.2% |

=== 2010 census ===
As of the 2010 census, the population was 231.

== Education ==
It is in the Westville Public Schools school district.
