= Blackgum, Oklahoma =

Blackgum
- Unincorporated community
- Location within Oklahoma Location within the United States
- Coordinates: 35°36′40″N 94°59′24″W
- Country: United States
- State: Oklahoma
- County: Sequoyah

Area
  - Total: 0.22 sq mi (0.57 km^{2})
  - Land: 0.22 sq mi (0.56 km^{2})
  - Water: 0 sq mi (0.00 km^{2})
- Elevation: 915 ft (279 m)

Population (2020)
  - Total: 47
  - Density: 216.1/sq mi (83.42/km^{2})
- Time zone: UTC-6 (Central (CST))
  - Summer (DST): UTC-5 (CDT)
- Area codes: 918 & 539
- GNIS feature ID: 2584374

Blackgum is an unincorporated community and census-designated place in Sequoyah County, Oklahoma, United States. As of the 2020 census, Blackgum had a population of 47. Oklahoma State Highway 100 passes through the community.

Blackgum had a post office from June 17, 1895, until February 15, 1995. It was named for the blackgum tree.

== Geography ==
According to the U.S. Census Bureau, the community has an area of 0.219 square miles (0.57 km^{2}); 0.218 square miles (0.56 km^{2}) of its area is land, and 0.001 square miles (0.0026 km^{2}) is water.

== Demographics ==
Historical population
Census	Pop.	Note	%±
2010	51		—
2020	47		−7.8%
U.S. Decennial Census

=== 2020 census ===
As of the 2020 census, Blackgum had a population of 47. The median age was 60.3 years. 17.0% of residents were under the age of 18 and 25.5% of residents were 65 years of age or older. For every 100 females there were 80.8 males, and for every 100 females age 18 and over there were 85.7 males age 18 and over.

0.0% of residents lived in urban areas, while 100.0% lived in rural areas.

There were 16 households in Blackgum, of which 25.0% had children under the age of 18 living in them. Of all households, 37.5% were married-couple households, 12.5% were households with a male householder and no spouse or partner present, and 18.8% were households with a female householder and no spouse or partner present. About 18.8% of all households were made up of individuals and 0.0% had someone living alone who was 65 years of age or older.

There were 24 housing units, of which 33.3% were vacant. The homeowner vacancy rate was 20.0% and the rental vacancy rate was 20.0%.

Racial composition as of the 2020 census
Race	Number	Percent
White	24	51.1%
Black or African American	0	0.0%
American Indian and Alaska Native	19	40.4%
Asian	2	4.3%
Native Hawaiian and Other Pacific Islander	0	0.0%
Some other race	0	0.0%
Two or more races	2	4.3%
Hispanic or Latino (of any race)	0	0.0%

=== 2010 census ===
As of the 2010 United States census, the population of Blackgum was 51.
