= National Register of Historic Places listings in Delaware County, Oklahoma =

Location of Delaware County in Oklahoma

This is a list of the National Register of Historic Places listings in Delaware County, Oklahoma.

This is intended to be a complete list of the properties on the National Register of Historic Places in Delaware County, Oklahoma, United States. The locations of National Register properties for which the latitude and longitude coordinates are included below, may be seen in a map.

There are 8 properties listed on the National Register in the county.

This National Park Service list is complete through NPS recent listings posted July 10, 2026.

== Current listings ==
	Name on the Register	Image	Date listed	Location	City or town	Description
1	Bassett Grove Ceremonial Grounds		July 20, 1983 (#83002085)	Address Restricted	Grove	
2	Beattie's Prairie		March 11, 2014 (#14000050)	Address Restricted	Jay	
3	Corey House/Hotel	Corey House/Hotel	December 17, 1982 (#82001495)	208 S. Main St. 36°35′39″N 94°46′09″W	Grove	
4	Delaware School, District No. 64		December 27, 2023 (#100009663)	approx. 6 miles (9.7 km) north of Jay on US 59/OK 10; In front of Delaware Baptist Church, 35551 S 620 Rd. (US 59) between Jay and Grove, OK; 36°30′10″N 94°46′52″W	Jay	
5	Hildebrand Mill	Hildebrand Mill	October 18, 1972 (#72001062)	South of Colcord, 10 miles west of West Siloam Springs, Oklahoma; 36°11′53″N 94°40′16″W	Dripping Springs	
6	Polson Cemetery	Polson Cemetery	November 21, 1977 (#77001092)	Northeast of Jay on E 340 Rd. 36°31′31″N 94°38′10″W	Jay	
7	Saline District Courthouse	Saline District Courthouse	January 1, 1976 (#76001561)	1.5 miles south of the intersection of State Highway 33, Scenic U.S. Route 412, and County Road NS449; 36°12′27″N 95°00′36″W	Rose	Now a museum
8	Splitlog Church	Splitlog Church	October 26, 1972 (#72001061)	About 9 miles northeast of Grove, 26227 S 670 Rd. 36°38′01″N 94°40′47″W	Grove	

== See also ==
- List of National Historic Landmarks in Oklahoma
- National Register of Historic Places listings in Oklahoma
