= Oak Hill-Piney, Oklahoma =

- Census-designated place
- Location within Oklahoma Location within the United States
- Coordinates: 36°22′43″N 94°43′36″W
- Country: United States
- State: Oklahoma
- County: Delaware

Area
  - Total: 2.66 sq mi (6.90 km^{2})
  - Land: 2.66 sq mi (6.90 km^{2})
  - Water: 0 sq mi (0.00 km^{2})
- Elevation: 974 ft (297 m)

Population (2020)
  - Total: 191
  - Density: 71.7/sq mi (27.69/km^{2})
- Time zone: UTC-6 (Central (CST))
  - Summer (DST): UTC-5 (CDT)
- ZIP Code: 74346 (Jay)
- Area codes: 918/539
- FIPS code: 40-53301
- GNIS feature ID: 2807039

Oak Hill-Piney is a census-designated place (CDP) in Delaware County, Oklahoma, United States. It was first listed as a CDP prior to the 2020 census. As of the 2020 census, Oak Hill-Piney had a population of 191.

The CDP is in east-central Delaware County. It is bordered to the north by the Sycamore CDP, and it is 6 miles (10 km) southeast of Jay, the county seat. The southern border of Oak Hill-Piney is Beaty Creek, a west-flowing tributary of Spavinaw Creek flowing into Lake Eucha and part of the Neosho River watershed.

== Demographics ==
Historical population
Census	Pop.	Note	%±
2020	191		—
U.S. Decennial Census

=== 2020 census ===
As of the 2020 census, Oak Hill-Piney had a population of 191. The median age was 35.1 years. 24.6% of residents were under the age of 18 and 8.4% of residents were 65 years of age or older. For every 100 females there were 89.1 males, and for every 100 females age 18 and over there were 105.7 males age 18 and over.

0.0% of residents lived in urban areas, while 100.0% lived in rural areas.

There were 55 households in Oak Hill-Piney, of which 27.3% had children under the age of 18 living in them. Of all households, 50.9% were married-couple households, 9.1% were households with a male householder and no spouse or partner present, and 40.0% were households with a female householder and no spouse or partner present. About 34.5% of all households were made up of individuals and 16.4% had someone living alone who was 65 years of age or older.

There were 69 housing units, of which 20.3% were vacant. The homeowner vacancy rate was 0.0% and the rental vacancy rate was 16.7%.

Racial composition as of the 2020 census
Race	Number	Percent
White	64	33.5%
Black or African American	3	1.6%
American Indian and Alaska Native	104	54.5%
Asian	0	0.0%
Native Hawaiian and Other Pacific Islander	0	0.0%
Some other race	2	1.0%
Two or more races	18	9.4%
Hispanic or Latino (of any race)	6	3.1%

== Education ==
It is in the Jay Public Schools school district.
