= Dennis, Oklahoma =

- Census-designated place
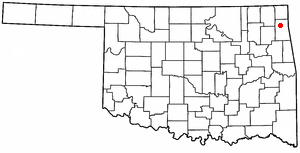
- Location of Dennis, Oklahoma
- Coordinates: 36°32′36″N 94°52′10″W
- Country: United States
- State: Oklahoma
- County: Delaware

Area
  - Total: 4.53 sq mi (11.73 km^{2})
  - Land: 4.53 sq mi (11.72 km^{2})
  - Water: 0 sq mi (0.00 km^{2})
- Elevation: 846 ft (258 m)

Population (2020)
  - Total: 221
  - Density: 48.8/sq mi (18.85/km^{2})
- Time zone: UTC-6 (Central (CST))
  - Summer (DST): UTC-5 (CDT)
- FIPS code: 40-20100
- GNIS feature ID: 2408659

Dennis is an unincorporated community and census-designated place (CDP) in Delaware County, Oklahoma, near Grand Lake. As of the 2020 census, Dennis had a population of 221. The Dennis Post Office existed from March 25, 1914, until January 31, 1956. It is said to be named for a local resident, Peter Dennis.

== Geography ==
Dennis is located in north-central Delaware County on the south side of Grand Lake. It is 12 miles (19 km) northwest of Jay, the county seat, and 16 miles (26 km) by road southwest of the city of Grove.

According to the United States Census Bureau, the Dennis CDP has a total area of 4.5 square miles (11.7 km^{2}), all land.

== Demographics ==
Historical population
| Census | Pop. | Note | %± |
|---|---|---|---|
| 2020 | 221 | | — |
U.S. Decennial Census

=== 2020 census ===
As of the 2020 census, Dennis had a population of 221. The median age was 60.5 years. 19.5% of residents were under the age of 18 and 39.8% of residents were 65 years of age or older. For every 100 females there were 145.6 males, and for every 100 females age 18 and over there were 169.7 males age 18 and over.

0.0% of residents lived in urban areas, while 100.0% lived in rural areas.

There were 96 households in Dennis, of which 7.3% had children under the age of 18 living in them. Of all households, 77.1% were married-couple households, 13.5% were households with a male householder and no spouse or partner present, and 8.3% were households with a female householder and no spouse or partner present. About 17.7% of all households were made up of individuals and 4.2% had someone living alone who was 65 years of age or older.

There were 238 housing units, of which 59.7% were vacant. The homeowner vacancy rate was 11.0% and the rental vacancy rate was 0.0%.

Racial composition as of the 2020 census
| Race | Number | Percent |
|---|---|---|
| White | 164 | 74.2% |
| Black or African American | 0 | 0.0% |
| American Indian and Alaska Native | 24 | 10.9% |
| Asian | 0 | 0.0% |
| Native Hawaiian and Other Pacific Islander | 0 | 0.0% |
| Some other race | 2 | 0.9% |
| Two or more races | 31 | 14.0% |
| Hispanic or Latino (of any race) | 2 | 0.9% |

=== 2000 census ===
As of the census of 2000, there were 185 people, 77 households, and 64 families residing in the CDP. The population density was 40.9 inhabitants per square mile (15.8/km^{2}). There were 217 housing units at an average density of 48.0 per square mile (18.5/km^{2}). The racial makeup of the CDP was 87.03% White, 7.57% Native American, and 5.41% from two or more races. Hispanic or Latino of any race were 0.54% of the population.

There were 77 households, out of which 28.6% had children under the age of 18 living with them, 79.2% were married couples living together, 2.6% had a female householder with no husband present, and 15.6% were non-families. 13.0% of all households were made up of individuals, and 6.5% had someone living alone who was 65 years of age or older. The average household size was 2.40 and the average family size was 2.63.

In the CDP, the population was spread out, with 21.6% under the age of 18, 3.2% from 18 to 24, 20.5% from 25 to 44, 33.0% from 45 to 64, and 21.6% who were 65 years of age or older. The median age was 49 years. For every 100 females, there were 98.9 males. For every 100 females age 18 and over, there were 104.2 males.

The median income for a household in the CDP was $38,542, and the median income for a family was $38,542. Males had a median income of $36,500 versus $19,583 for females. The per capita income for the CDP was $14,366. None of the population or families were below the poverty line.

== Education ==
It is in the Grove Public Schools school district.
