= District Courthouse =

District Courthouse may refer to:

in the United States

(by state then city)

- District Courthouse and Police Station, Hilo, Hawaii, listed on the National Register of Historic Places (NRHP)
- Kohala District Courthouse, Kapaau, Hawaii, listed on the NRHP on Hawaii island
- Old Third District Courthouse, New Bedford, Massachusetts, listed on the NRHP
- St. Louis County District Courthouse, Virginia, Minnesota, NRHP-listed in St. Louis County
- U.S. District Courthouse, Hattiesburg, Mississippi, listed on the NRHP in Mississippi
- Tallahatchie County Second District Courthouse, Sumner, Mississippi, listed on the NRHP
- Third Judicial District Courthouse, New York, New York, listed on the NRHP
- Saline District Courthouse, Rose, Oklahoma, listed on the NRHP in Oklahoma
- District Courthouse (Aguadilla, Puerto Rico), listed on the NRHP in Puerto Rico
- Humacao District Courthouse, Humacao, Puerto Rico, listed on the NRHP in Puerto Rico
- Sixth District Courthouse, Providence, Rhode Island, listed on the NRHP
- Woonsocket District Courthouse, Woonsocket, Rhode Island, listed on the NRHP

== See also ==
- List of courthouses in the United States
