= Indianola, Oklahoma =

Indianola is the name of two communities in the U.S. state of Oklahoma:

- Indianola, Delaware County, Oklahoma, a census-designated place
- Indianola, Pittsburg County, Oklahoma, a town
