= Cloud Creek, Oklahoma =

- Census-designated place
- Location within the state of Oklahoma
- Coordinates: 36°17′35″N 94°44′22″W
- Country: United States
- State: Oklahoma
- County: Delaware

Area
  - Total: 14.80 sq mi (38.33 km^{2})
  - Land: 14.80 sq mi (38.33 km^{2})
  - Water: 0 sq mi (0.00 km^{2})
- Elevation: 1,053 ft (321 m)

Population (2020)
  - Total: 319
  - Density: 21.5/sq mi (8.32/km^{2})
- Time zone: UTC-6 (Central (CST))
  - Summer (DST): UTC-5 (CST)
- FIPS code: 40-15625
- GNIS feature ID: 2407638

Cloud Creek is an unincorporated community and census-designated place (CDP) in Delaware County, Oklahoma, United States. As of the 2020 census, Cloud Creek had a population of 319.

== Geography ==
Cloud Creek is located in southern Delaware County. Its eastern border is formed by U.S. Route 59, which leads north 14 miles (23 km) to Jay, the county seat, and south 5 miles (8 km) to the town of Kansas.

According to the United States Census Bureau, the Cloud Creek CDP has a total area of 7.2 square miles (18.7 km^{2}), all land.

== Demographics ==
Historical population
Census	Pop.	Note	%±
2020	319		—
U.S. Decennial Census

=== 2020 census ===
As of the 2020 census, Cloud Creek had a population of 319. The median age was 40.2 years. 22.6% of residents were under the age of 18 and 23.2% of residents were 65 years of age or older. For every 100 females there were 161.5 males, and for every 100 females age 18 and over there were 160.0 males age 18 and over.

0.0% of residents lived in urban areas, while 100.0% lived in rural areas.

There were 123 households in Cloud Creek, of which 28.5% had children under the age of 18 living in them. Of all households, 65.9% were married-couple households, 19.5% were households with a male householder and no spouse or partner present, and 9.8% were households with a female householder and no spouse or partner present. About 16.2% of all households were made up of individuals and 6.5% had someone living alone who was 65 years of age or older.

There were 136 housing units, of which 9.6% were vacant. The homeowner vacancy rate was 0.0% and the rental vacancy rate was 0.0%.

Racial composition as of the 2020 census
Race	Number	Percent
White	144	45.1%
Black or African American	5	1.6%
American Indian and Alaska Native	125	39.2%
Asian	11	3.4%
Native Hawaiian and Other Pacific Islander	0	0.0%
Some other race	5	1.6%
Two or more races	29	9.1%
Hispanic or Latino (of any race)	12	3.8%

=== 2000 census ===
As of the census of 2000, there were 86 people, 30 households, and 26 families residing in the community. The population density was 11.9 people per square mile (4.6/km^{2}). There were 31 housing units at an average density of 4.3/sq mi (1.7/km^{2}). The racial makeup of the community was 52.33% White, 43.02% Native American, 1.16% from other races, and 3.49% from two or more races. Hispanic or Latino of any race were 1.16% of the population.

There were 30 households, out of which 43.3% had children under the age of 18 living with them, 63.3% were married couples living together, 20.0% had a female householder with no husband present, and 13.3% were non-families. 13.3% of all households were made up of individuals, and 6.7% had someone living alone who was 65 years of age or older. The average household size was 2.87 and the average family size was 3.15.

The population age distribution was spread out, with 33.7% under the age of 18, 4.7% from 18 to 24, 31.4% from 25 to 44, 24.4% from 45 to 64, and 5.8% who were 65 years of age or older. The median age was 33 years. For every 100 females, there were 83.0 males. For every 100 females age 18 and over, there were 96.6 males.

The median income for a household in the CDP was $23,333, and the median income for a family was $18,125. Males had a median income of $100,000 versus $0 for females. The per capita income for the community was $20,127. There were 63.6% of families and 70.5% of the population living below the poverty line, including 100.0% of under eighteens and none of those over 64.

== Education ==
Most of it is in the Jay Public Schools school district, while a piece is in the Colcord Public Schools school district, and a very small piece is in the Kansas Public Schools school district.
