= KURM =

KURM may refer to:

- KURM (AM), a radio station (790 AM) licensed to Rogers, Arkansas, United States
- KRLY (formerly KURM-FM), a radio station (100.3 FM) licensed to Gravette, Arkansas, United States
