= KLRC =

Radio station in Siloam Springs, Arkansas

Coordinates: 36.191°N 94.566°W

KLRC, KLAB and KFPW-FM
- KLRC: Tahlequah, Oklahoma KLAB: Siloam Springs, Arkansas KFPW-FM: Barling, Arkansas; United States
- Broadcast area: Northwest Arkansas, Eastern Oklahoma, Southwest Missouri, Arkansas River Valley
- Frequency: KLRC: 90.9 MHz; KLAB: 101.1 MHz; KFPW-FM: 94.5 MHz
- Branding: 90.9 KLRC

Programming
- Format: Christian adult contemporary

Ownership
- Owner: John Brown University
- Sister stations: KRLY (Real FM)

History
- First air date: KLRC: February 2013; KLAB: October 1, 1983

Technical information
- Licensing authority: FCC
- Facility ID: 174140
- Class: KLRC: C1; KLAB: C3; KFPW-FM: C3
- ERP: KLRC: 100,000 watts KLAB: 7,700 watts KFPW-FM: 18,500 watts
- HAAT: KLRC: 148 meters (486 ft); KLAB: 138 meters (453 ft); KFPW-FM: 82 meters (269 ft)
- Translators: 99.1 K256BG (Bentonville); 103.5 K278BB (Springdale)

Links
- Public license information: KLRC, KLAB and KFPW-FM Public file; LMS
- Webcast: Listen Live
- Website: klrc.com

KLRC (90.9 MHz) is a non-commercial FM radio station licensed to Tahlequah, Oklahoma. It serves sections of Northwest Arkansas, Eastern Oklahoma, Southwest Missouri, and the Arkansas River Valley.

KLRC broadcasts a Christian adult contemporary radio format and is owned by John Brown University. It is simulcast on KLAB at 101.1 MHz in Siloam Springs, Arkansas, KFPW-FM at 94.5 MHz in Barling, as well as FM translators 99.1 K256BG in Bentonville and 103.5 K278BG in Springdale. KLRC uses periodic on-air fundraisers to seek support from listeners for the running of the stations.

KLRC has an effective radiated power of 100,000 watts, the maximum for non-grandfathered FM stations. The transmitter is on North 4670 Road in Dripping Springs, Oklahoma. KLAB is powered at 7,700 watts, using a transmitter on West University Street in Siloam Springs. KFPW-FM has a power of 18,500 watts, with a transmitter on Old Harrison Ln in Fort Smith. The studios and offices are on North Broadway in Siloam Springs.

KLRC is branded as "90.9 KLRC" and also operates a sister station branded as 100.3 Real FM.

== History ==
On October 1, 1983, KLRC signed on the air. It was a 115 watt station at 90.3 MHz, serving only the John Brown University (JBU) campus and surrounding community. The station was housed in the "Cathedral of the Ozarks" on the JBU campus and carried Christian radio and classical music programs. Its primary purpose was to serve as a training ground for JBU broadcasting students.

In the fall of 1988, the Federal Communications Commission (FCC) approved an increase to 3,100 watts effective radiated power. The FCC also changed the frequency of KLRC from 90.3 to 101.1 MHz. In 1990, another power increase to 6,000 watts was approved.

In January 1996, KLRC began broadcasting 24 hours a day. In 2000, the 60-year-old tower from which KLRC had been broadcasting was brought down as the station began broadcasting from a new tower and transmitter. In September of that year, KLRC debuted worldwide with its live internet stream.

In 2002, KLRC moved out of the Learning Resource Center and into its own building on the west end of the John Brown University campus, giving the station more room to expand. The studios were moved again in the summer of 2011, this time to a building located off-campus in downtown Siloam Springs.

In February 2013, KLRC launched a new 100,000 watt signal on 90.9 MHz. The tower is located in Dripping Springs, Oklahoma, and the station is licensed to Tahlequah, Oklahoma. The station in Siloam Springs on the 101.1 FM frequency changed its call sign to KLAB. The two stations simulcast the same programming, with additional FM translators previously added in Bentonville and Springdale in Northwest Arkansas.

In April 2025, KLRC launched sister station Real FM on KRLY at 100.3 FM.

In November 2026, KLRC also began simulcasting on KFPW-FM at 94.5 MHz in Barling, covering the Arkansas River Valley region. Additionally, KLRC announced plans to air its sister format, Real FM, on KFPW-FM's HD2 digital subchannel using HD Radio technology, as well as on its Van Buren translator at 101.1 FM.

== On-air staff ==
Mark Michaels and Becky David are the station's morning hosts. Kara Culver and Robert Forbes are heard in the afternoon. Andrea Barnett is the midday host. A syndicated show, "Keep the Faith" with Penny, is heard in the evening. Several part-time staff and John Brown University broadcasting students fill the remaining on-air roles.

== Awards ==
KLRC has been named the Christian Music Broadcasters (CMB) "Small Market Radio Station of the Year" six times (2000, 2001, 2002, 2006, 2008, and 2016), and "Medium Market Radio Station of the Year" three times (2019, 2023, and 2026). The National Association of Broadcasters (NAB) named KLRC the Marconi Award winner for Religious Station of the Year in 2013.

== See also ==
- Campus radio
- List of college radio stations in the United States
