= Tagg Flats, Oklahoma =

Unincorporated community in Oklahoma, US

- Census-designated place
- Location within the state of Oklahoma
- Coordinates: 36°20′19″N 94°54′13″W
- Country: United States
- State: Oklahoma
- County: Delaware

Area
  - Total: 5.02 sq mi (13.00 km^{2})
  - Land: 5.02 sq mi (13.00 km^{2})
  - Water: 0 sq mi (0.00 km^{2})
- Elevation: 902 ft (275 m)

Population (2020)
  - Total: 12
  - Density: 2.4/sq mi (0.92/km^{2})
- Time zone: UTC-6 (Central (CST))
  - Summer (DST): UTC-5 (CDT)
- FIPS code: 40-72075
- GNIS feature ID: 2410049

Tagg Flats is a census-designated place (CDP) in Delaware County, Oklahoma, United States. As of the 2020 census, Tagg Flats had a population of 12.

== Geography ==
Tagg Flats is located in southwestern Delaware County. It is on the south side of Lake Eucha and is bordered to the west by Old Eucha and to the south by Bull Hollow. By road it is 16 miles (26 km) southwest of Jay, the Delaware County seat.

According to the United States Census Bureau, the Tagg Flats CDP has a total area of 5.0 square miles (13.0 km^{2}), all land.

== Demographics ==
Historical population
Census	Pop.	Note	%±
2020	12		—
U.S. Decennial Census

=== 2020 census ===
As of the 2020 census, Tagg Flats had a population of 12. The median age was 66.0 years. 16.7% of residents were under the age of 18 and 50.0% of residents were 65 years of age or older. For every 100 females there were 100.0 males, and for every 100 females age 18 and over there were 100.0 males age 18 and over.

0.0% of residents lived in urban areas, while 100.0% lived in rural areas.

There were 2 households in Tagg Flats. No households had children under the age of 18. Both households were married-couple households. There were no households headed by a single male or single female householder. There were no one-person households, including anyone living alone who was 65 years of age or older.

There were 13 housing units, of which 84.6% were vacant. All 2 occupied housing units were owner-occupied. The homeowner vacancy rate was 0.0% and the rental vacancy rate was 100.0%.

Racial composition as of the 2020 census
Race	Number	Percent
White	5	41.7%
Black or African American	0	0.0%
American Indian and Alaska Native	1	8.3%
Asian	0	0.0%
Native Hawaiian and Other Pacific Islander	0	0.0%
Some other race	0	0.0%
Two or more races	6	50.0%
Hispanic or Latino (of any race)	2	16.7%

=== 2000 census ===
As of the census of 2000, there were 11 people, 6 households, and 1 family residing in the CDP. The population density was 2.2 people per square mile (0.8/km^{2}). There were 7 housing units at an average density of 1.4/sq mi (0.5/km^{2}). The racial makeup of the CDP was 54.55% White, 36.36% Native American, and 9.09% from two or more races.

There were 6 households, out of which 33.3% had children under the age of 18 living with them, none were married couples living together, 16.7% had a female householder with no husband present, and 66.7% were non-families. 50.0% of all households were made up of individuals, and none had someone living alone who was 65 years of age or older. The average household size was 1.83 and the average family size was 2.50.

In the CDP, the population was spread out, with 18.2% under the age of 18, 9.1% from 18 to 24, 27.3% from 25 to 44, 27.3% from 45 to 64, and 18.2% who were 65 years of age or older. The median age was 44 years. For every 100 females, there were 175.0 males. For every 100 females age 18 and over, there were 200.0 males.

The median income for a household in the CDP was $0, and the median income for a family was $8,750. Males had a median income of $6,250 versus $0 for females. The per capita income for the CDP was $2,774. There were 50.0% of families and 52.6% of the population living below the poverty line, including 50.0% of those under 18 and none of those over 64.

The per capita income in Tagg Flats makes it the seventh-poorest place in the United States.

== Education ==
It is divided between Kansas Public Schools and Jay Public Schools school districts.
