= Eucha, Oklahoma =

Community in Oklahoma, US

Coordinates: 36°23′31″N 94°52′59″W

Old Eucha and New Eucha are nearby census-designated places in Delaware County.

Eucha, pronounced "oochee", is a community located in Delaware County, Oklahoma, United States. It is north of Lake Eucha, east of Spavinaw Lake, west of Lake Eucha Park, and southeast of Grand Lake o' the Cherokees. The center of Eucha is located at the western edge of the New Eucha census-designated place, a statistical area that extends north as far as Oklahoma State Highway 20, east to U.S. Route 59, and south to Rattlesnake Creek.

The Eucha Post Office was established November 20, 1900, in District 5 of the old Indian Territory. The community was named for Oochelata, a principal chief of the Cherokees. Eucha, well known for its Indian culture, often has Indian taco sales.

Eucha Lake, named for the town, is noted for the Delaware County Gigging Tournament every year in April. Gigging is an old-fashioned method of fishing that utilizes gigs, a long pole that has been tipped with a multi-pronged spear. Fishermen use these trident-like gigs to spear fish while on flat boats. The use of gigging spears reflects the area's Cherokee heritage and keeps the fishing tradition alive. The average household income for a Eucha family is $30,268.

The Picture in Scripture Amphitheater has an Eucha address but is north of the town. On Fridays and Saturdays for several weeks during the summer, it presents the story of the apostle Paul.

== Notable people ==
- Barbara Starr Scott (1939–2020), Cherokee Nation tribal councilor (1983–1987, 1995–1999)

== Sources ==
- Shirk, George H.; Oklahoma Place Names; University of Oklahoma Press; Norman, Oklahoma; 1987: ISBN 0-8061-2028-2 .
