= New Eucha, Oklahoma =

- Census-designated place
- Location within the state of Oklahoma
- Coordinates: 36°23′28″N 94°51′08″W
- Country: United States
- State: Oklahoma
- County: Delaware

Area
  - Total: 7.76 sq mi (20.11 km^{2})
  - Land: 7.76 sq mi (20.11 km^{2})
  - Water: 0 sq mi (0.00 km^{2})
- Elevation: 1,040 ft (320 m)

Population (2020)
  - Total: 400
  - Density: 51.5/sq mi (19.89/km^{2})
- Time zone: UTC-6 (Central (CST))
  - Summer (DST): UTC-5 (CST)
- FIPS code: 40-51275
- GNIS feature ID: 2408917

New Eucha is a census-designated place (CDP) in Delaware County, Oklahoma, United States. As of the 2020 census, New Eucha had a population of 400.

== Geography ==
New Eucha is located in central Delaware County and is bordered to its northeast by the city of Jay, the county seat. The original community of Eucha occupies a corner of land at the western edge of the CDP.

According to the United States Census Bureau, the New Eucha CDP has a total area of 7.8 square miles (20.1 km^{2}), all land.

== Demographics ==
Historical population
Census	Pop.	Note	%±
2020	400		—
U.S. Decennial Census

=== 2020 census ===
As of the 2020 census, New Eucha had a population of 400. The median age was 37.0 years. 18.2% of residents were under the age of 18 and 16.8% of residents were 65 years of age or older. For every 100 females there were 109.4 males, and for every 100 females age 18 and over there were 94.6 males age 18 and over.

0.0% of residents lived in urban areas, while 100.0% lived in rural areas.

There were 151 households in New Eucha, of which 26.5% had children under the age of 18 living in them. Of all households, 60.3% were married-couple households, 21.9% were households with a male householder and no spouse or partner present, and 10.6% were households with a female householder and no spouse or partner present. About 21.2% of all households were made up of individuals and 11.9% had someone living alone who was 65 years of age or older.

There were 164 housing units, of which 7.9% were vacant. The homeowner vacancy rate was 0.0% and the rental vacancy rate was 0.0%.

Racial composition as of the 2020 census
Race	Number	Percent
White	172	43.0%
Black or African American	0	0.0%
American Indian and Alaska Native	149	37.2%
Asian	12	3.0%
Native Hawaiian and Other Pacific Islander	0	0.0%
Some other race	2	0.5%
Two or more races	65	16.2%
Hispanic or Latino (of any race)	11	2.8%

=== 2000 census ===
As of the census of 2000, there were 300 people, 112 households, and 82 families residing in the CDP. The population density was 39.5 inhabitants per square mile (15.3/km^{2}). There were 128 housing units at an average density of 16.8/sq mi (6.5/km^{2}). The racial makeup of the CDP was 49.67% White, 41.67% Native American, and 8.67% from two or more races.

There were 112 households, out of which 38.4% had children under the age of 18 living with them, 58.0% were married couples living together, 11.6% had a female householder with no husband present, and 25.9% were non-families. 20.5% of all households were made up of individuals, and 10.7% had someone living alone who was 65 years of age or older. The average household size was 2.68 and the average family size was 3.12.

In the CDP, the population was spread out, with 27.3% under the age of 18, 9.7% from 18 to 24, 28.0% from 25 to 44, 23.7% from 45 to 64, and 11.3% who were 65 years of age or older. The median age was 35 years. For every 100 females, there were 109.8 males. For every 100 females age 18 and over, there were 92.9 males.

The median income for a household in the CDP was $24,712, and the median income for a family was $34,583. Males had a median income of $18,333 versus $15,000 for females. The per capita income for the CDP was $12,643. About 1.5% of families and 0.9% of the population were below the poverty line, including 1.7% of those under the age of eighteen and none of those 65 or over.

== Education ==
It is in the Jay Public Schools school district.
