= Deer Lick =

Deer Lick or Deerlick may refer to:

- Deer Lick, Oklahoma, a census-designated place in the United States
- Deerlick, West Virginia, an unincorporated community in the United States
- Deer Lick Cluster, the NGC 7331 Group, a group of galaxies in constellation Pegasus
- Deer Lick Nature Sanctuary, in Cattaraugus County, New York, United States
- Deerlick Run, a tributary of Fishing Creek in Columbia County, Pennsylvania, United States

== See also ==
- Mineral lick, also known as salt lick or natural lick, a natural mineral deposit where animals in nutrient-poor ecosystems can obtain essential mineral nutrients
