= Dodge, Oklahoma =

- Census-designated place
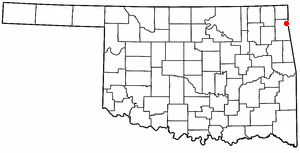
- Location of Dodge, Oklahoma
- Coordinates: 36°34′44″N 94°38′18″W
- Country: United States
- State: Oklahoma
- County: Delaware

Area
  - Total: 6.59 sq mi (17.08 km^{2})
  - Land: 6.59 sq mi (17.08 km^{2})
  - Water: 0 sq mi (0.00 km^{2})
- Elevation: 922 ft (281 m)

Population (2020)
  - Total: 89
  - Density: 13.5/sq mi (5.21/km^{2})
- Time zone: UTC-6 (Central (CST))
  - Summer (DST): UTC-5 (CDT)
- FIPS code: 40-21020
- GNIS feature ID: 2408676

Dodge is an unincorporated community and census-designated place (CDP) in Delaware County, Oklahoma, United States. As of the 2020 census, Dodge had a population of 89.

The Dodge Post Office existed from November 20, 1901, until August 15, 1941. Dodge was established on Cowskin Prairie along the St. Louis-San Francisco Railway in District 6 of the old Indian Territory.

== Geography ==
Dodge is located in northeastern Delaware County. Its eastern border is the Missouri state line, and it is 6 miles (10 km) east of the city of Grove.

According to the United States Census Bureau, the CDP has a total area of 6.6 square miles (17.1 km^{2}), all land.

== Demographics ==
Historical population
Census	Pop.	Note	%±
2020	89		—
U.S. Decennial Census

=== 2020 census ===
As of the 2020 census, Dodge had a population of 89. The median age was 44.3 years. 22.5% of residents were under the age of 18 and 24.7% of residents were 65 years of age or older. For every 100 females there were 97.8 males, and for every 100 females age 18 and over there were 109.1 males age 18 and over.

0.0% of residents lived in urban areas, while 100.0% lived in rural areas.

There were 25 households in Dodge, of which 40.0% had children under the age of 18 living in them. Of all households, 52.0% were married-couple households, 12.0% were households with a male householder and no spouse or partner present, and 32.0% were households with a female householder and no spouse or partner present. About 32.0% of all households were made up of individuals and 12.0% had someone living alone who was 65 years of age or older.

There were 32 housing units, of which 21.9% were vacant. The homeowner vacancy rate was 5.0% and the rental vacancy rate was 11.1%.

Racial composition as of the 2020 census
Race	Number	Percent
White	67	75.3%
Black or African American	0	0.0%
American Indian and Alaska Native	8	9.0%
Asian	0	0.0%
Native Hawaiian and Other Pacific Islander	0	0.0%
Some other race	4	4.5%
Two or more races	10	11.2%
Hispanic or Latino (of any race)	13	14.6%

=== 2000 census ===
As of the census of 2000, there were 96 people, 32 households, and 27 families residing in the CDP. The population density was 14.6 people per square mile (5.6/km^{2}). There were 34 housing units at an average density of 5.2/sq mi (2.0/km^{2}). The racial makeup of the CDP was 81.25% White, 7.29% Native American, 3.12% from other races, and 8.33% from two or more races. Hispanic or Latino of any race were 11.46% of the population.

There were 32 households, out of which 40.6% had children under the age of 18 living with them, 65.6% were married couples living together, 9.4% had a female householder with no husband present, and 15.6% were non-families. 9.4% of all households were made up of individuals, and 6.3% had someone living alone who was 65 years of age or older. The average household size was 3.00 and the average family size was 3.15.

In the CDP, the population was spread out, with 29.2% under the age of 18, 9.4% from 18 to 24, 28.1% from 25 to 44, 28.1% from 45 to 64, and 5.2% who were 65 years of age or older. The median age was 32 years. For every 100 females, there were 146.2 males. For every 100 females age 18 and over, there were 119.4 males.

The median income for a household in the CDP was $41,500, and the median income for a family was $43,750. Males had a median income of $16,250 versus $38,750 for females. The per capita income for the CDP was $17,652. None of the population and none of the families were below the poverty line.

== Education ==
It is in the Grove Public Schools school district.
