= Lendonwood Gardens =

Non-profit botanical gardens in Grove, Oklahoma, United States

Coordinates: 36°35′02″N 94°47′11″W

- Interactive map of Lendonwood Gardens
- Location: Grove, Oklahoma
- Area: 8-acre (3.2 ha)
- Website: lendonwood.com

Lendonwood Gardens are non-profit botanical gardens in Grove, Oklahoma. The 8-acre (3.2 ha) gardens were founded in 1995 by Dr. Leonard Miller, a retired dentist, and consist of a blend of American and Japanese gardening techniques. Major plantings took about 18 months to complete. In 1997 the Gardens became a non-profit organization and are now part of the Oklahoma Botanical Garden system. To be designated a botanical garden, a site must contain labeled plants, be open to the public, and contain at least 225 species.

The gardens contain more than 1,200 different types of plants, including one of the largest collections of Chamaecyparis (false cypress) in the United States, one of the largest collection of rhododendrons in the Southwest, 500 varieties of daylilies, 25 varieties of dogwoods, more than 50 bonsai, 75 varieties of Japanese maples, and 70 varieties of hostas, as well as a 150-foot (46 m) stream consisting of nine pools of water, and a koi pond. Plants in the American Backyard Xeriscape Garden thrive without additional watering and include annuals such as zinnias and marigolds.

== See also ==
- List of botanical gardens and arboretums in the United States
