= Deer Lick, Oklahoma =

- Census-designated place
- Location within the state of Oklahoma
- Coordinates: 36°27′34″N 94°44′49″W
- Country: United States
- State: Oklahoma
- County: Delaware

Area
  - Total: 0.95 sq mi (2.47 km^{2})
  - Land: 0.95 sq mi (2.47 km^{2})
  - Water: 0 sq mi (0.00 km^{2})
- Elevation: 1,070 ft (330 m)

Population (2020)
  - Total: 34
  - Density: 35.7/sq mi (13.77/km^{2})
- Time zone: UTC-6 (Central (CST))
  - Summer (DST): UTC-5 (CST)
- FIPS code: 40-19665
- GNIS feature ID: 2584377

Deer Lick is an unincorporated community and census-designated place (CDP) in Delaware County, Oklahoma, United States. As of the 2020 census, Deer Lick had a population of 34.

== Geography ==
Deer Lick is located in central Delaware County, 4 miles (6 km) northeast of Jay, the county seat. According to the United States Census Bureau, the Deer Lick CDP has a total area of 0.95 square miles (2.47 km^{2}), all land.

== Demographics ==
Historical population
Census	Pop.	Note	%±
2020	34		—
U.S. Decennial Census

=== 2020 census ===
As of the 2020 census, Deer Lick had a population of 34. The median age was 18.2 years. 47.1% of residents were under the age of 18 and 11.8% of residents were 65 years of age or older. For every 100 females there were 78.9 males, and for every 100 females age 18 and over there were 125.0 males age 18 and over.

0.0% of residents lived in urban areas, while 100.0% lived in rural areas.

There were 16 households in Deer Lick, of which 37.5% had children under the age of 18 living in them. Of all households, 56.3% were married-couple households, 0.0% were households with a male householder and no spouse or partner present, and 31.3% were households with a female householder and no spouse or partner present. About 6.3% of all households were made up of individuals and 6.3% had someone living alone who was 65 years of age or older.

There were 18 housing units, of which 11.1% were vacant. The homeowner vacancy rate was 0.0% and the rental vacancy rate was 0.0%.

Racial composition as of the 2020 census
Race	Number	Percent
White	24	70.6%
Black or African American	0	0.0%
American Indian and Alaska Native	2	5.9%
Asian	0	0.0%
Native Hawaiian and Other Pacific Islander	0	0.0%
Some other race	0	0.0%
Two or more races	8	23.5%
Hispanic or Latino (of any race)	4	11.8%

== Education ==
It is in the Jay Public Schools school district.
