= Sycamore, Delaware County, Oklahoma =

Unincorporated community in Oklahoma, US

Sycamore, Oklahoma
- Census-designated place
- Location within the state of Oklahoma
- Coordinates: 36°23′56″N 94°42′54″W
- Country: United States
- State: Oklahoma
- County: Delaware

Area
  - Total: 2.98 sq mi (7.71 km^{2})
  - Land: 2.98 sq mi (7.71 km^{2})
  - Water: 0 sq mi (0.00 km^{2})
- Elevation: 1,060 ft (320 m)

Population (2020)
  - Total: 65
  - Density: 21.8/sq mi (8.43/km^{2})
- Time zone: UTC-6 (Central (CST))
  - Summer (DST): UTC-5 (CST)
- FIPS code: 40-71965
- GNIS feature ID: 2410042

Sycamore is a census-designated place (CDP) in Delaware County, Oklahoma, United States. The population was 177 at the 2010 census.

== Geography ==
Sycamore is located in east-central Delaware County. It is 6 miles (10 km) east of Jay, the county seat.

According to the United States Census Bureau, the Sycamore CDP has a total area of 4.1 square miles (10.7 km^{2}), all land.

== Demographics ==
Historical population
Census	Pop.	Note	%±
2000	183		—
2010	177		−3.3%
2020	65		−63.3%
U.S. Decennial Census

As of the census of 2000, there were 183 people, 55 households, and 48 families residing in the CDP. The population density was 44.2 inhabitants per square mile (17.1/km^{2}). There were 59 housing units at an average density of 14.2/sq mi (5.5/km^{2}). The racial makeup of the CDP was 36.61% White, 59.02% Native American, and 4.37% from two or more races.

There were 55 households, out of which 49.1% had children under the age of 18 living with them, 60.0% were married couples living together, 16.4% had a female householder with no husband present, and 12.7% were non-families. 10.9% of all households were made up of individuals, and 1.8% had someone living alone who was 65 years of age or older. The average household size was 3.33 and the average family size was 3.54.

In the CDP, the population was spread out, with 35.5% under the age of 18, 7.7% from 18 to 24, 26.2% from 25 to 44, 24.0% from 45 to 64, and 6.6% who were 65 years of age or older. The median age was 30 years. For every 100 females, there were 96.8 males. For every 100 females age 18 and over, there were 93.4 males.

The median income for a household in the CDP was $44,250, and the median income for a family was $44,250. Males had a median income of $30,000 versus $28,125 for females. The per capita income for the CDP was $9,218. About 19.6% of families and 8.9% of the population were below the poverty line, including 4.1% of those under the age of eighteen and none of those 65 or over.

== Education ==
It is in the Jay Public Schools school district.
