= KWXC =

- Grove, Oklahoma; United States
- Frequency: 88.9 MHz
- Branding: Faith by Hearing

Programming
- Format: Religious

Ownership
- Owner: Grove Broadcasting Inc.

Technical information
- Licensing authority: FCC
- Facility ID: 90108
- Class: A
- ERP: 6,000 watts
- HAAT: 73.1 meters (240 ft)
- Transmitter coordinates: 36°35′42.00″N 94°38′5.00″W

Links
- Public license information: Public file; LMS
- Webcast: https://www.kwxcradio.com/listen-live/
- Website: KWXC Radio

KWXC (88.9 FM) is a radio station broadcasting a religious format. Licensed to Grove, Oklahoma, United States, the station is currently owned by Grove Broadcasting Inc.
