= Iron Post, Oklahoma =

- census-designated place
- Location within Oklahoma Location within the United States
- Coordinates: 36°09′20″N 95°08′06″W
- Country: United States
- State: Oklahoma
- County: Mayes

Area
  - Total: 2.67 sq mi (6.92 km^{2})
  - Land: 2.67 sq mi (6.92 km^{2})
  - Water: 0 sq mi (0.00 km^{2})
- Elevation: 883 ft (269 m)

Population (2020)
  - Total: 65
  - Density: 24.3/sq mi (9.39/km^{2})
- Time zone: UTC-6 (Central (CST))
  - Summer (DST): UTC-5 (CST)
- ZIP Code: 74352 (Locust Grove)
- FIPS code: 40-37275
- GNIS feature ID: 2408432

Iron Post is a census-designated place (CDP) in Mayes County, Oklahoma, United States. The population was 65 at the 2020 census, down from 92 in 2010.

== Geography ==
The community is in southeastern Mayes County. It is bordered to the northeast by Snake Creek and to the east by the Cherokee County line. Oklahoma State Highway 82 passes just to the west of the CDP, leading north 3 miles (5 km) to Locust Grove and southeast 22 miles (35 km) to Tahlequah.

According to the U.S. Census Bureau, the Iron Post CDP has a total area of 2.7 square miles (7.0 km^{2}), all land. Spring Creek forms the southern boundary of the CDP, and its tributary Snake Creek forms the northwestern boundary. Spring Creek flows west to join the Neosho River in Fort Gibson Lake.

== Demographics ==
Historical population
Census	Pop.	Note	%±
2000	117		—
2010	92		−21.4%
2020	65		−29.3%
U.S. Decennial Census

=== 2020 census ===
As of the 2020 census, Iron Post had a population of 65. The median age was 51.9 years. 16.9% of residents were under the age of 18 and 13.8% of residents were 65 years of age or older. For every 100 females there were 150.0 males, and for every 100 females age 18 and over there were 170.0 males age 18 and over.

0.0% of residents lived in urban areas, while 100.0% lived in rural areas.

There were 22 households in Iron Post, of which 40.9% had children under the age of 18 living in them. Of all households, 36.4% were married-couple households, 0.0% were households with a male householder and no spouse or partner present, and 63.6% were households with a female householder and no spouse or partner present. About 18.2% of all households were made up of individuals and 13.6% had someone living alone who was 65 years of age or older.

There were 35 housing units, of which 37.1% were vacant. The homeowner vacancy rate was 0.0% and the rental vacancy rate was 50.0%.

Racial composition as of the 2020 census
Race	Number	Percent
White	42	64.6%
Black or African American	0	0.0%
American Indian and Alaska Native	19	29.2%
Asian	0	0.0%
Native Hawaiian and Other Pacific Islander	0	0.0%
Some other race	0	0.0%
Two or more races	4	6.2%
Hispanic or Latino (of any race)	0	0.0%

=== 2000 census ===
As of the census of 2000, there were 117 people, 44 households, and 33 families residing in the CDP. The population density was 43.5 inhabitants per square mile (16.8/km^{2}). There were 50 housing units at an average density of 18.6/sq mi (7.2/km^{2}). The racial makeup of the CDP was 59.83% White, 30.77% Native American, and 9.40% from two or more races. Hispanic or Latino of any race were 1.71% of the population.

There were 44 households, out of which 31.8% had children under the age of 18 living with them, 59.1% were married couples living together, 11.4% had a female householder with no husband present, and 25.0% were non-families. 25.0% of all households were made up of individuals, and 9.1% had someone living alone who was 65 years of age or older. The average household size was 2.66 and the average family size was 3.09.

In the CDP, the population was spread out, with 23.9% under the age of 18, 10.3% from 18 to 24, 32.5% from 25 to 44, 29.9% from 45 to 64, and 3.4% who were 65 years of age or older. The median age was 40 years. For every 100 females, there were 108.9 males. For every 100 females age 18 and over, there were 111.9 males.

The median income for a household in the CDP was $34,000, and the median income for a family was $34,000. Males had a median income of $33,750 versus $11,250 for females. The per capita income for the CDP was $13,265. None of the population and none of the families were below the poverty line.

== Education ==
It is in the Locust Grove Public Schools school district.
