= Grove High School =

Public school in Oklahoma, United States

Location
- 300 Ford Road; Grove, Oklahoma 74344; United States; 36.5991562°N 94.7506854°W

Information
- Type: High School
- Motto: Together Everyone Achieves More through Growth, Responsibility, Organization, Values, and Education
- School district: Grove Public Schools
- Superintendent: Pat Dodson
- Principal: Bobby Kreutz
- Teaching staff: 45.62 (FTE)
- Grades: 9–12
- Enrollment: 751 (2023–2024)
- Student to teacher ratio: 16.46
- Colors: Red, black, and white
- Team name: Ridgerunners
- Website: www.ridgerunners.net/o/gps/page/grove-high-school

Grove High School is a public high school in Grove, Oklahoma, United States. It is one of four schools in a school district that includes Grove Lower Elementary School, Grove Upper Elementary School and Grove Middle School.

The school mascot is the "Ridgerunner."

== Curriculum ==
The state of Oklahoma requires students to take four units of English, three units of mathematics and three units of science to graduate. Students must also complete a unit of American History, a half unit of Oklahoma History, a half unit of United States Government and an additional unit in social studies courses.

Oklahoma high schools must provide an elective physical education course unless the Oklahoma State Department of Education offers an exemption due to undue hardship.

Students must also take two units of a non-English language, two units of computer technology and a unit of fine arts or speech.

Grove High School also offers Advanced Placement and concurrent enrollment courses through the Northeast Oklahoma Career Tech Center.

== Extracurricular activities ==
Grove High School offers many extracurricular activities for students, including an academic competition team, athletics, a robotics education program, marching band, competitive speech, art, choir, FCCLA, FFA, and a drama program. There are also several community service clubs, including Character Counts and Interact. Other groups are the Heritage Club for Native American students, Teen Court, Student Council, Spanish Club, Math Club, and Yearbook.

== Notable alumni ==
- Jim Beauchamp, Former Major League Baseball player
- Sam Pittman, Head coach at University of Arkansas
- Josh West, army veteran, former state representative
