= Ridgerunner =

Nickname for people from mountainous areas in the Southeastern United States

"Ridgerunner" is a nickname for people from the higher parts of mountainous areas in the Southeastern United States, especially the Appalachians. However, it has significantly different meanings from one State to another. The name has been used of people from some parts of: Pennsylvania, Maryland, West Virginia, Kentucky, Tennessee, Virginia, Georgia, Alabama, Arkansas and Oklahoma.

== Appalachian Trail ==
The name Ridgerunner is used officially for a person who works on the Appalachian Trail. In this particular sense, a Ridgerunner meets, greets and guides hikers, as well as providing brochures and literature to inform visitors about the trail. They cover its location, regulations, and traditions. They take steps to encourage the best behavior on the part of hikers, to facilitate a positive experience (particularly for those who are poorly prepared), and to elicit the support of Trail neighbors and those who live nearby, but who may not understand or use the Trail properly. Ridgerunners, by their presence, discourage and mitigate misuse of the Appalachian Trail and its environs by performing educational and public relations functions.

== Moonshiners ==
In Eastern Oklahoma, Arkansas, Tennessee, West Virginia and western Virginia, the term Ridgerunner originally referred specifically to a transporter of illegal moonshine liquor. They were said to "run the ridges" with their illicit cargo to bypass the roads down in the hollows where law enforcement officers might find them.

The mascot of Grove High School, in the town of Grove, Oklahoma, is a Ridgerunner in this sense of the word.

== See also ==
- Ridgerunner, a novel by Gil Adamson
