= Little Rock, Oklahoma =

- Census-designated place
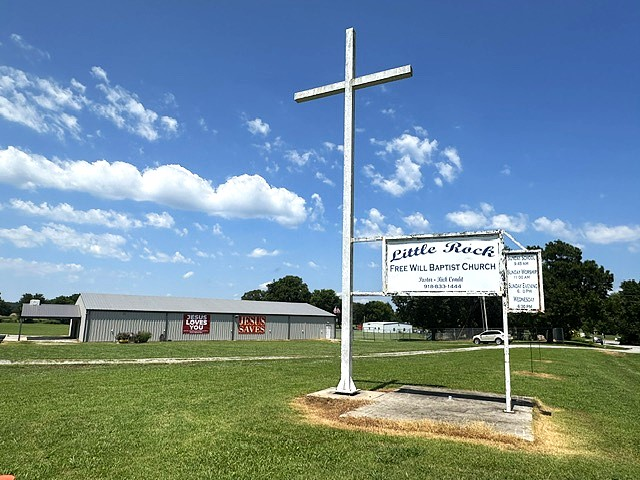
- Little Rock Baptist Church in July of 2026

- Location within Oklahoma Location within the United States
- Coordinates: 36°13′01″N 95°05′33″W
- Country: United States
- State: Oklahoma
- County: Mayes

Area
  - Total: 7.03 sq mi (18.21 km^{2})
  - Land: 7.01 sq mi (18.16 km^{2})
  - Water: 0.019 sq mi (0.05 km^{2})
- Elevation: 902 ft (275 m)

Population (2020)
  - Total: 197
  - Density: 28.1/sq mi (10.85/km^{2})
- Time zone: UTC-6 (Central (CST))
  - Summer (DST): UTC-5 (CDT)
- ZIP Codes: 74352 (Locust Grove); 74365 (Salina); 74364 (Rose)
- Area codes: 918/539
- FIPS code: 40-43442
- GNIS feature ID: 2805332

Little Rock is an unincorporated community and census-designated place (CDP) in Mayes County, Oklahoma, United States. It was first listed as a CDP for the 2020 census, with a population of 197.

The CDP is in southeastern Mayes County, bordered to the east by Rose and to the south by Snake Creek. U.S. Route 412, the Cherokee Turnpike, passes through the community, with access from Exit 6 at Locust Grove, 6 miles (10 km) to the southwest, and from Exit 17 between Rose and Leach, the same distance to the east.

According to the U.S. Census Bureau, the Little Rock CDP has an area of 7.03 square miles (18.21 km^{2}), of which 7.01 square miles (18.16 km^{2}) are land and 0.02 square miles (0.05 km^{2}), or 0.27%, are water. Snake Creek, a southwest-flowing tributary of the Neosho River, forms the southern boundary of the CDP.

== Demographics ==
Historical population
Census	Pop.	Note	%±
2020	197		—
U.S. Decennial Census

=== 2020 census ===
As of the 2020 census, Little Rock had a population of 197. The median age was 52.1 years. 15.7% of residents were under the age of 18 and 27.9% of residents were 65 years of age or older. For every 100 females there were 85.8 males, and for every 100 females age 18 and over there were 100.0 males age 18 and over.

0.0% of residents lived in urban areas, while 100.0% lived in rural areas.

There were 79 households in Little Rock, of which 25.3% had children under the age of 18 living in them. Of all households, 43.0% were married-couple households, 34.2% were households with a male householder and no spouse or partner present, and 15.2% were households with a female householder and no spouse or partner present. About 29.1% of all households were made up of individuals and 17.8% had someone living alone who was 65 years of age or older.

There were 89 housing units, of which 11.2% were vacant. The homeowner vacancy rate was 0.0% and the rental vacancy rate was 3.8%.

Racial composition as of the 2020 census
Race	Number	Percent
White	95	48.2%
Black or African American	1	0.5%
American Indian and Alaska Native	62	31.5%
Asian	4	2.0%
Native Hawaiian and Other Pacific Islander	1	0.5%
Some other race	6	3.0%
Two or more races	28	14.2%
Hispanic or Latino (of any race)	9	4.6%

== Education ==
It is in the Locust Grove Public Schools school district.
