= Snake Creek, Oklahoma =

- Census-designated place
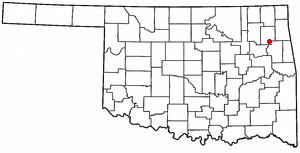
- Location in Oklahoma
- Coordinates: 36°10′42″N 95°05′38″W
- Country: United States
- State: Oklahoma
- County: Mayes

Area
  - Total: 8.36 sq mi (21.64 km^{2})
  - Land: 8.36 sq mi (21.64 km^{2})
  - Water: 0 sq mi (0.00 km^{2})
- Elevation: 935 ft (285 m)

Population (2020)
  - Total: 255
  - Density: 30.5/sq mi (11.78/km^{2})
- Time zone: UTC-6 (Central (CST))
  - Summer (DST): UTC-5 (CDT)
- ZIP Code: 74352 (Locust Grove)
- FIPS code: 40-68275
- GNIS feature ID: 2408751

Snake Creek (Cherokee: ᎢᎾᏛᏱ) is a census-designated place (CDP) in Mayes County, Oklahoma, United States. The population was 255 at the 2020 census.

== Geography ==
Snake Creek is in southeastern Mayes County, bordered to the north by Little Rock, to the northeast by Rose, and to the southwest by Iron Post. Most of the southern border of the community is also the Cherokee County line. Locust Grove, whose post office serves Snake Creek, is 6 miles (10 km) to the northwest.

According to the U.S. Census Bureau, the Snake Creek CDP has a total area of 8.4 square miles (21.8 km^{2}), all land. The CDP is bordered to the northwest by Snake Creek, which flows southwest to Spring Creek near Cedar Crest. The entire CDP is within the watershed of the Neosho River.

== Demographics ==
Historical population
Census	Pop.	Note	%±
2000	298		—
2010	257		−13.8%
2020	255		−0.8%
U.S. Decennial Census

=== 2020 census ===
As of the 2020 census, Snake Creek had a population of 255. The median age was 45.9 years. 20.8% of residents were under the age of 18 and 13.7% of residents were 65 years of age or older. For every 100 females there were 117.9 males, and for every 100 females age 18 and over there were 106.1 males age 18 and over.

0.0% of residents lived in urban areas, while 100.0% lived in rural areas.

There were 110 households in Snake Creek, of which 29.1% had children under the age of 18 living in them. Of all households, 61.8% were married-couple households, 9.1% were households with a male householder and no spouse or partner present, and 22.7% were households with a female householder and no spouse or partner present. About 25.5% of all households were made up of individuals and 15.4% had someone living alone who was 65 years of age or older.

There were 117 housing units, of which 6.0% were vacant. The homeowner vacancy rate was 0.0% and the rental vacancy rate was 0.0%.

Racial composition as of the 2020 census
Race	Number	Percent
White	171	67.1%
Black or African American	0	0.0%
American Indian and Alaska Native	63	24.7%
Asian	0	0.0%
Native Hawaiian and Other Pacific Islander	0	0.0%
Some other race	1	0.4%
Two or more races	20	7.8%
Hispanic or Latino (of any race)	2	0.8%

=== 2000 census ===
As of the census of 2000, there were 298 people, 103 households, and 80 families residing in the CDP. The population density was 35.8 inhabitants per square mile (13.8/km^{2}). There were 109 housing units at an average density of 13.1/sq mi (5.1/km^{2}). The racial makeup of the CDP was 73.15% White, 25.50% Native American, and 1.34% from two or more races.

There were 103 households, out of which 32.0% had children under the age of 18 living with them, 72.8% were married couples living together, 3.9% had a female householder with no husband present, and 21.4% were non-families. 19.4% of all households were made up of individuals, and 3.9% had someone living alone who was 65 years of age or older. The average household size was 2.89 and the average family size was 3.31.

In the CDP, the population was spread out, with 27.5% under the age of 18, 10.4% from 18 to 24, 25.8% from 25 to 44, 29.2% from 45 to 64, and 7.0% who were 65 years of age or older. The median age was 34 years. For every 100 females, there were 109.9 males. For every 100 females age 18 and over, there were 109.7 males.

The median income for a household in the CDP was $31,813, and the median income for a family was $32,500. Males had a median income of $23,194 versus $11,328 for females. The per capita income for the CDP was $14,300. None of the population or families were below the poverty line.

== Education ==
It is in the Locust Grove Public Schools school district.
