= Indianola, Delaware County, Oklahoma =

- Census-designated place
- Location within the state of Oklahoma
- Coordinates: 36°26′40″N 94°40′29″W
- Country: United States
- State: Oklahoma
- County: Delaware

Area
  - Total: 0.88 sq mi (2.28 km^{2})
  - Land: 0.88 sq mi (2.28 km^{2})
  - Water: 0 sq mi (0.00 km^{2})
- Elevation: 1,122 ft (342 m)

Population (2020)
  - Total: 51
  - Density: 57.9/sq mi (22.37/km^{2})
- Time zone: UTC-6 (Central (CST))
  - Summer (DST): UTC-5 (CST)
- FIPS code: 40-36945
- GNIS feature ID: 2584382

Indianola is an unincorporated area and census-designated place (CDP) in Delaware County, Oklahoma, United States. The population was 48 at the 2010 census.

== Geography ==
Indianola is located in east-central Delaware County, 8 miles (13 km) east of Jay, the county seat, and 5 miles (8 km) west of the Arkansas border.

According to the United States Census Bureau, the Indianola CDP has a total area of 0.89 square miles (2.3 km^{2}), all land.

== Demographics ==
Historical population
Census	Pop.	Note	%±
2010	48		—
2020	51		6.3%
U.S. Decennial Census

== Education ==
It is in the Jay Public Schools school district.
