= Bull Hollow, Oklahoma =

- Census-designated place
- Location within the state of Oklahoma
- Coordinates: 36°18′17″N 94°54′02″W
- Country: United States
- State: Oklahoma
- County: Delaware

Area
  - Total: 5.39 sq mi (13.95 km^{2})
  - Land: 5.39 sq mi (13.95 km^{2})
  - Water: 0 sq mi (0.00 km^{2})
- Elevation: 1,073 ft (327 m)

Population (2020)
  - Total: 61
  - Density: 11.3/sq mi (4.37/km^{2})
- Time zone: UTC-6 (Central (CST))
  - Summer (DST): UTC-5 (CST)
- FIPS code: 40-09887
- GNIS feature ID: 2407920

Bull Hollow is an unincorporated community and census-designated place (CDP) in Delaware County, Oklahoma, United States. As of the 2020 census, Bull Hollow had a population of 61.

== Geography ==
Bull Hollow is located in southwestern Delaware County along Saline Creek and its tributary valleys. It is bordered to the north by the Tagg Flats CDP and to the west by the Kenwood CDP.

According to the United States Census Bureau, the Bull Hollow CDP has a total area of 5.4 square miles (13.9 km^{2}), all land.

== Demographics ==
Historical population
Census	Pop.	Note	%±
2020	61		—
U.S. Decennial Census

=== 2020 census ===
As of the 2020 census, Bull Hollow had a population of 61. The median age was 30.3 years. 29.5% of residents were under the age of 18 and 0.0% of residents were 65 years of age or older. For every 100 females there were 154.2 males, and for every 100 females age 18 and over there were 168.8 males age 18 and over.

0.0% of residents lived in urban areas, while 100.0% lived in rural areas.

There were 22 households in Bull Hollow, of which 45.5% had children under the age of 18 living in them. Of all households, 40.9% were married-couple households, 22.7% were households with a male householder and no spouse or partner present, and 36.4% were households with a female householder and no spouse or partner present. About 36.3% of all households were made up of individuals and 13.6% had someone living alone who was 65 years of age or older.

There were 27 housing units, of which 18.5% were vacant. The homeowner vacancy rate was 0.0% and the rental vacancy rate was 0.0%.

Racial composition as of the 2020 census
Race	Number	Percent
White	7	11.5%
Black or African American	0	0.0%
American Indian and Alaska Native	51	83.6%
Asian	0	0.0%
Native Hawaiian and Other Pacific Islander	0	0.0%
Some other race	2	3.3%
Two or more races	1	1.6%
Hispanic or Latino (of any race)	3	4.9%

=== 2000 census ===
As of the census of 2000, there were 84 people, 31 households, and 20 families residing in the CDP. The population density was 15.7 people per square mile (6.1/km^{2}). There were 33 housing units at an average density of 6.2/sq mi (2.4/km^{2}). The racial makeup of the community was 16.67% White, 76.19% Native American, and 7.14% from two or more races.

There were 31 households, out of which 32.3% had children under the age of 18 living with them, 48.4% were married couples living together, 12.9% had a female householder with no husband present, and 32.3% were non-families. 29.0% of all households were made up of individuals, and 22.6% had someone living alone who was 65 years of age or older. The average household size was 2.71 and the average family size was 3.43.

In the CDP, the population was spread out, with 25.0% under the age of 18, 10.7% from 18 to 24, 31.0% from 25 to 44, 20.2% from 45 to 64, and 13.1% who were 65 years of age or older. The median age was 38 years. For every 100 females, there were 100.0 males. For every 100 females age 18 and over, there were 103.2 males.

The median income for a household in the CDP was $11,875, and the median income for a family was $13,194. Males had a median income of $51,250 versus $13,750 for females. The per capita income for the community was $6,736. There were 60.0% of families and 58.4% of the population living below the poverty line, including 100.0% of under eighteens and none of those over 64.

== Education ==
It is in the Kansas Public Schools school district.
