= Rose, Oklahoma =

- Census-designated place
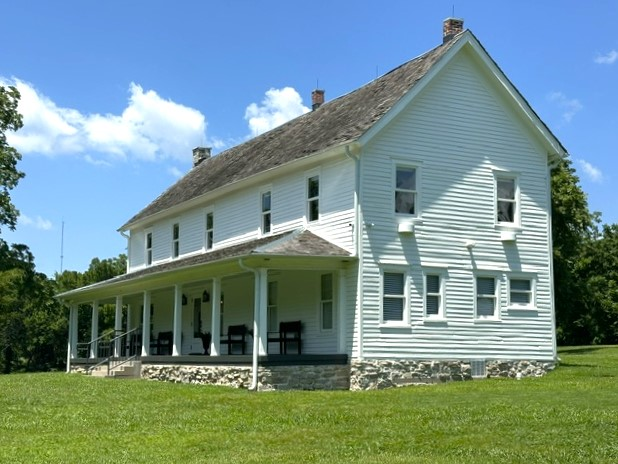
- Saline Courthouse after renovations, as seen in July of 2026

- Location within Oklahoma Location within the United States
- Coordinates: 36°12′44″N 95°02′17″W
- Country: United States
- State: Oklahoma
- County: Mayes

Area
  - Total: 9.05 sq mi (23.43 km^{2})
  - Land: 9.05 sq mi (23.43 km^{2})
  - Water: 0 sq mi (0.00 km^{2})
- Elevation: 961 ft (293 m)

Population (2020)
  - Total: 225
  - Density: 25/sq mi (9.6/km^{2})
- Time zone: UTC-6 (Central (CST))
  - Summer (DST): UTC-5 (CDT)
- ZIP Codes: 74364 (Rose); 74352 (Locust Grove); 74365 (Salina)
- FIPS code: 40-63950
- GNIS feature ID: 2584391

Rose is a small unincorporated rural community and census-designated place (CDP) in southeastern Mayes County, Oklahoma, United States, on U.S. Route 412 Alternate. As of the 2020 census, the population was 225, down from 285 in 2010. The ZIP Code is 74364.

== History ==
The community was said to have been named for Rowe's Prairie, which is nearby. The post office was established March 13, 1891, with David Ragsdale as the postmaster.

=== Saline District Courthouse ===
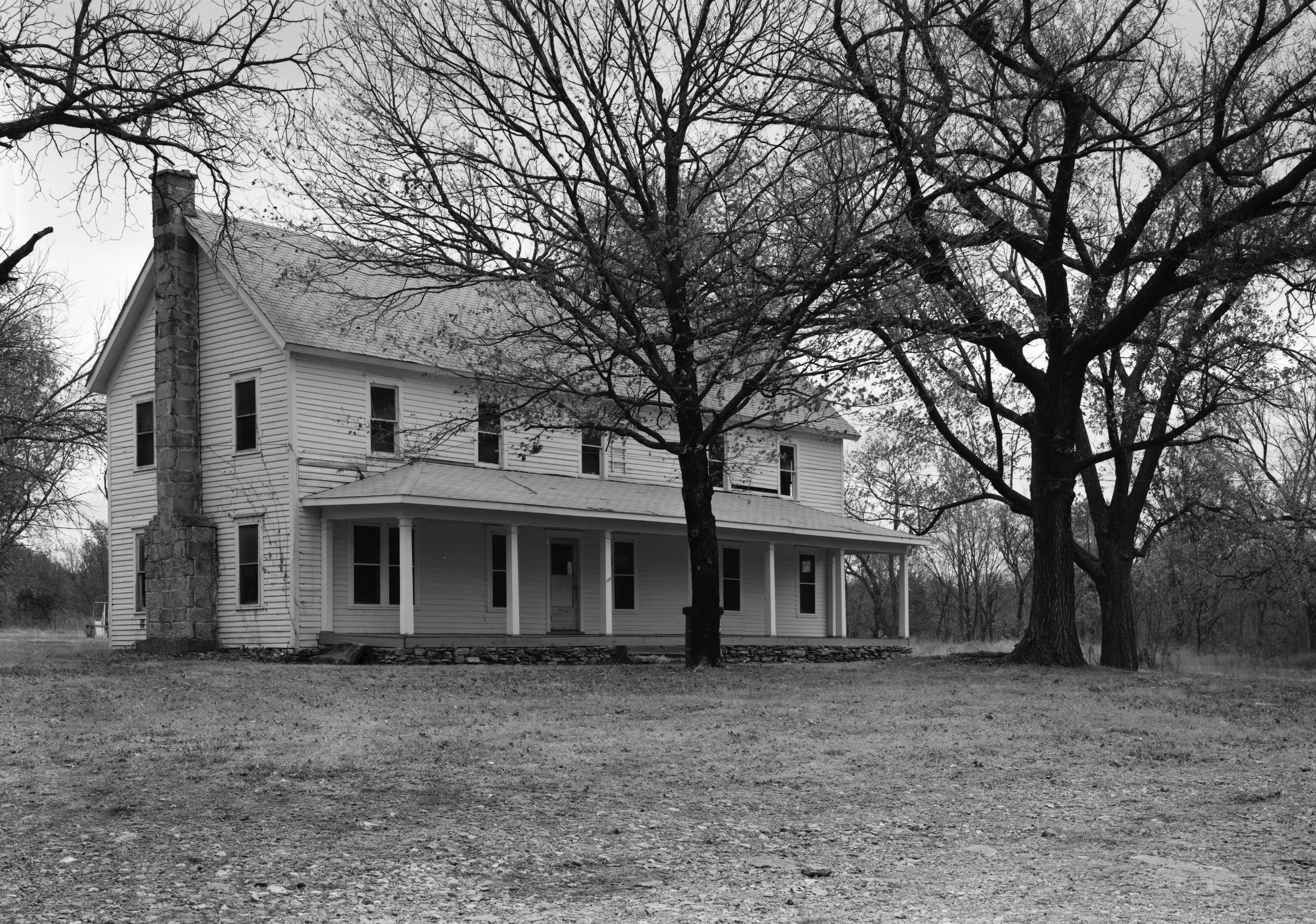
Saline District Courthouse in October of 1979

The historic Saline District Courthouse, the last remaining courthouse owned by the Cherokee Nation, is 1 mile (1.6 km) southeast of Rose on State Highway 33. It was built in 1884 on a site covering 14 acres (57,000 m^{2}).

The Cherokee Nation has designated this the first national park for the tribe. The building ceased to function for its original purpose when the Curtis Act dissolved the tribal government before Oklahoma became a state in 1907. The building was sold to the highest bidder and became a private residence until 1970. The owner sold it to the state, which later resold it to the Cherokee Nation. Although the state had agreed to maintain the structure, it did not do so. In 2003, Preservation Oklahoma, Inc. listed the Saline District Courthouse as one of "...Oklahoma's most endangered historic properties." The Cherokee Nation began restoring the site, including the grounds and a spring house, in 2008. The main building had been covered with lead-based paint, so the restoration received a $104,000 EPA Brownfields grant, plus a supplemental grant of $45,000 to complete the remediation project. In June 2011, the Oklahoma State Historical Society presented an award to the Nation for its efforts to restore the site. The building is now a museum and has rotating exhibits regarding the culture and history of the Cherokee Nation.

The courthouse, which lies just over the border in Delaware County, was added to the National Register of Historic Places listings in Delaware County, Oklahoma with NRIS number 76001561.

== Geography ==
Rose is in southeastern Mayes County, with its eastern border following the Delaware County line. It is bordered to the west by the communities of Little Rock and Snake Creek. U.S. Route 412, the Cherokee Turnpike, passes through the community, while the highway's former route, now U.S. Route 412 Alternate, passes through the center of town. Locust Grove is 8 miles (13 km) to the west, and the town of Kansas is 13 miles (21 km) to the east via US 412 Alternate.

According to the U.S. Census Bureau, the Rose CDP has an area of 9.05 square miles (23.44 km^{2}), all land. The community is drained to the west by Snake Creek, a tributary of the Neosho River.

== Demographics ==
Historical population
Census	Pop.	Note	%±
2010	285		—
2020	225		−21.1%
U.S. Decennial Census

=== 2020 census ===
As of the 2020 census, Rose had a population of 225. The median age was 42.5 years. 20.9% of residents were under the age of 18 and 22.7% of residents were 65 years of age or older. For every 100 females there were 136.8 males, and for every 100 females age 18 and over there were 122.5 males age 18 and over.

0.0% of residents lived in urban areas, while 100.0% lived in rural areas.

There were 83 households in Rose, of which 31.3% had children under the age of 18 living in them. Of all households, 75.9% were married-couple households, 6.0% were households with a male householder and no spouse or partner present, and 13.3% were households with a female householder and no spouse or partner present. About 14.4% of all households were made up of individuals and 8.4% had someone living alone who was 65 years of age or older.

There were 103 housing units, of which 19.4% were vacant. The homeowner vacancy rate was 0.0% and the rental vacancy rate was 28.6%.

Racial composition as of the 2020 census
Race	Number	Percent
White	156	69.3%
Black or African American	0	0.0%
American Indian and Alaska Native	43	19.1%
Asian	4	1.8%
Native Hawaiian and Other Pacific Islander	0	0.0%
Some other race	3	1.3%
Two or more races	19	8.4%
Hispanic or Latino (of any race)	5	2.2%

=== 2010 census ===
As of the 2010 United States census, Rose had a population of 285.

== Education ==
It is in the Locust Grove Public Schools school district.
