= Saline District Courthouse =

Historic courthouse in Oklahoma, United States

- U.S. National Register of Historic Places
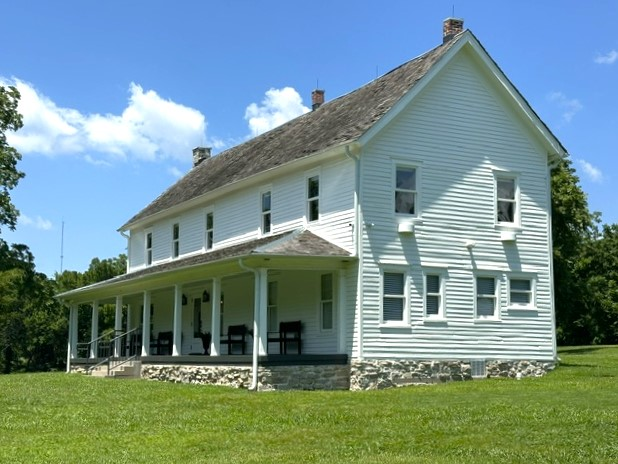
- Saline Courthouse in July of 2026

- Location within Oklahoma Location within the United States
- Nearest city: Rose, Oklahoma
- Coordinates: 36.2080864°N 95.0123036°W
- Area: 14 acres (5.7 ha)
- Built: 1884
- Built by: Cherokee Nation
- NRHP reference No.: 76001561
- Added to NRHP: January 1, 1976

The Saline District Courthouse was constructed in 1884 for use by the Cherokee Nation court system. It is located in Delaware County, Oklahoma just southeast of Rose, Oklahoma, and south of U.S. Route 412 at 55870 S. 490 Road. In 1976, it was listed on the National Register of Historic Places. Since 2019, the property functions as a Cherokee Nation national park with the building housing the Saline Courthouse Museum.

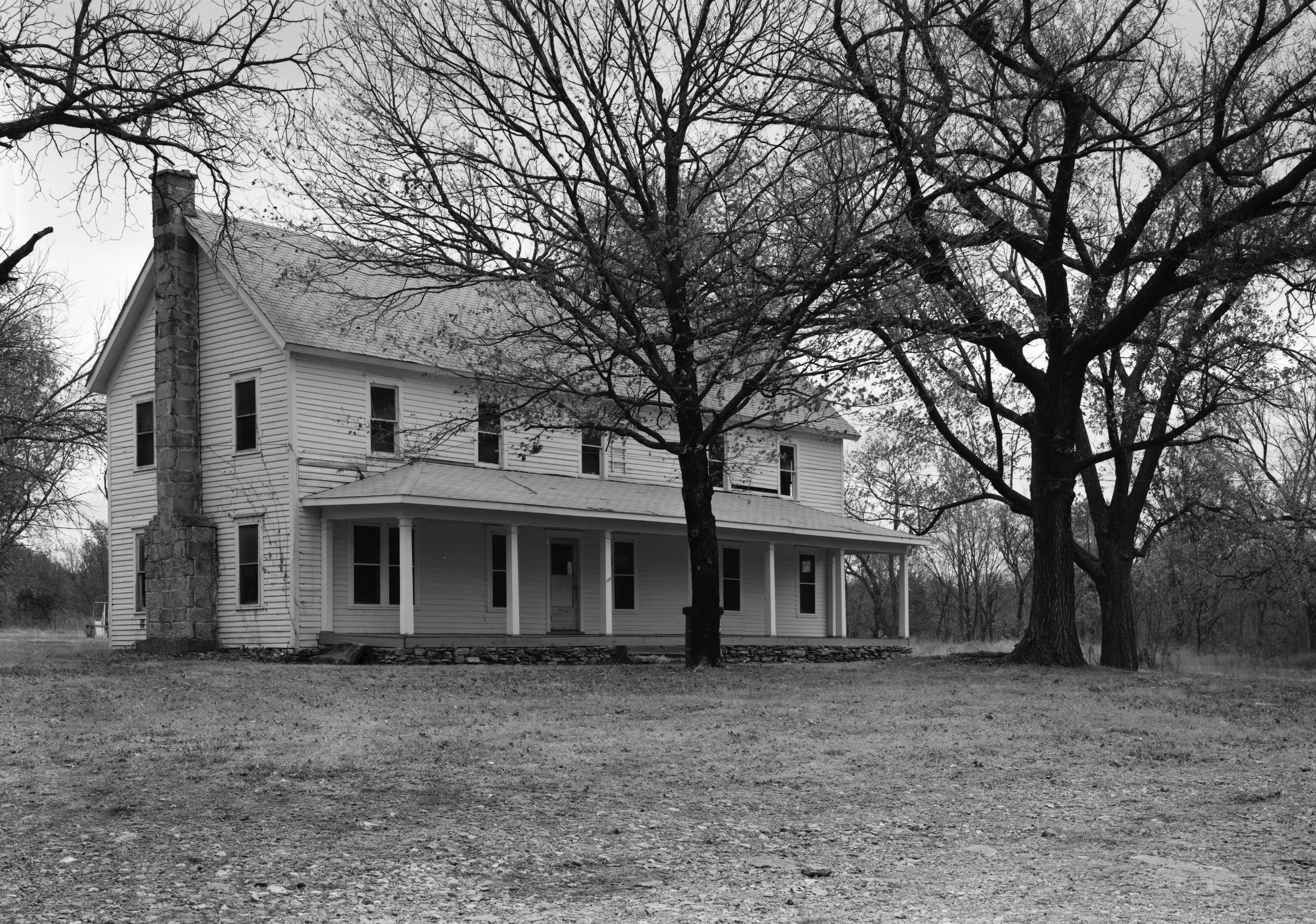
Saline District Courthouse, after listing but prior to renovation, in October of 1979

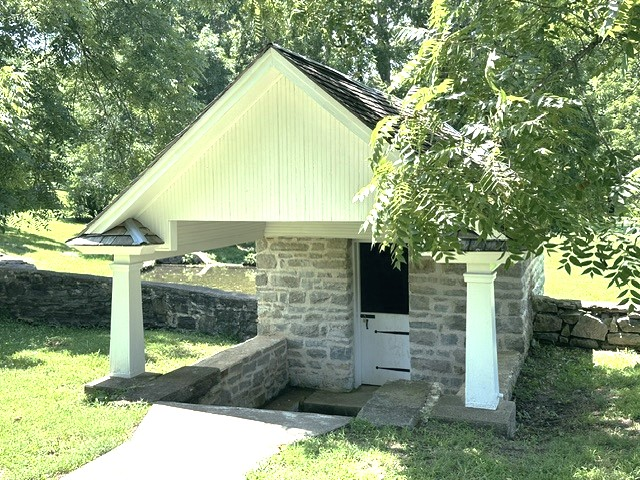
Spring House on the grounds of the Saline Courthouse in July of 2026

== History ==
After the Cherokee people were relocated to Indian Territory, they created eight administrative districts based on their 1839 Constitution. In 1856 they added a ninth, known as the Cooweescoowee (coo-wees-coo-wee) district. The Saline Courthouse, the core of which was constructed in 1884 in that ninth district, became one of the nine original Cherokee district courthouses—and the only one still surviving today. The name Saline was applied because it was situated near salt wells. The courthouse handled misdemeanor and civil cases for the tribe, while bigger cases were typically taken to Tahlequah. It served its function for about 14 years.

When in 1902 the Cherokees discontinued their court system due to the Curtis Act, the building was sold and ended up a residence, but remained under Cherokee owners. This continued until the 1930’s, when the property was sold to a non-native. Square footage was added at some point, doubling the size of the original building. The various residents during this period are credited by preservationists for maintaining the structure.

In 1970 the property was purchased by the State of Oklahoma’s parks department, (Note: Specifically, the property was held by the Oklahoma Industrial Development and Parks Department, before that agency’s functions were split between the Oklahoma Tourism and Recreation Department and the Oklahoma Department of Commerce.) with the idea that it might be turned into a state park. The courthouse was put on the National Register of Historic Places listings in Delaware County, Oklahoma on January 1, 1976. But the state park idea did not come to pass, and by the time the Cherokee Nation reacquired the property in 1988, the building was in disrepair.

Restoration efforts were slow, and the property was already on Preservation Oklahoma’s Most Endangered List when the non-profit Saline Preservation Association was formed in 2003. The Association and the Nation started addressing numerous issues—porch, chimneys, and fireplace stabilization, new windows, replacement of rotten siding, foundation restoration, and putting on a new roof—but a major problem was the presence of lead-based paint in the building. The Cherokee Nation applied for and was granted in 2008 a $104,000 cleanup grant from the Environmental Protection Agency, with remediation beginning in 2009 and concluding in 2010.

The Cherokee Nation in 2005 declared the 14-acre property to be its Saline National Park, the tribe’s first such park. The property includes not only the courthouse building, but also the original spring house and the Teehee Cemetery. When work on the courthouse building was finally completed in 2019, that structure became the Saline Courthouse Museum, run by Cherokee Nation Cultural Tourism.

The Museum has rotating exhibits regarding the culture and history of the Cherokee Nation. The grounds host various events including the recurring Watercress Fest which features a variety of foods, demonstrations, lectures and games.
