= Old Eucha, Oklahoma =

- Census-designated place
- Location within the state of Oklahoma
- Coordinates: 36°21′18″N 94°56′16″W
- Country: United States
- State: Oklahoma
- County: Delaware

Area
  - Total: 3.10 sq mi (8.03 km^{2})
  - Land: 3.10 sq mi (8.03 km^{2})
  - Water: 0 sq mi (0.00 km^{2})
- Elevation: 929 ft (283 m)

Population (2020)
  - Total: 23
  - Density: 7.4/sq mi (2.86/km^{2})
- Time zone: UTC-6 (Central (CST))
  - Summer (DST): UTC-5 (CST)
- FIPS code: 40-55275
- GNIS feature ID: 2408984

Old Eucha is a census-designated place (CDP) in Delaware County, Oklahoma, United States. As of the 2020 census, Old Eucha had a population of 23.

== Geography ==
Old Eucha is located in west-central Delaware County, south of Lake Eucha. It is bordered to the southwest by Kenwood and to the southeast by Tagg Flats.

According to the United States Census Bureau, the Old Eucha CDP has a total area of 3.1 square miles (8.0 km^{2}), all land.

== Demographics ==
Historical population
Census	Pop.	Note	%±
2020	23		—
U.S. Decennial Census

=== 2020 census ===
As of the 2020 census, Old Eucha had a population of 23. The median age was 48.5 years. 21.7% of residents were under the age of 18 and 8.7% of residents were 65 years of age or older. For every 100 females there were 283.3 males, and for every 100 females age 18 and over there were 260.0 males age 18 and over.

0.0% of residents lived in urban areas, while 100.0% lived in rural areas.

There were 14 households in Old Eucha, of which 14.3% had children under the age of 18 living in them. Of all households, 57.1% were married-couple households, 7.1% were households with a male householder and no spouse or partner present, and 35.7% were households with a female householder and no spouse or partner present. About 21.4% of all households were made up of individuals and 14.3% had someone living alone who was 65 years of age or older.

There were 14 housing units, of which 0.0% were vacant. The homeowner vacancy rate was 0.0% and the rental vacancy rate was 0.0%.

Racial composition as of the 2020 census
Race	Number	Percent
White	4	17.4%
Black or African American	0	0.0%
American Indian and Alaska Native	14	60.9%
Asian	0	0.0%
Native Hawaiian and Other Pacific Islander	0	0.0%
Some other race	0	0.0%
Two or more races	5	21.7%
Hispanic or Latino (of any race)	1	4.3%

=== 2000 census ===
As of the census of 2000, there were 46 people, 14 households, and 14 families residing in the CDP. The population density was 15.0 people per square mile (5.8/km^{2}). There were 14 housing units at an average density of 4.6/sq mi (1.8/km^{2}). The racial makeup of the CDP was 23.91% White, no African American, 71.74% Native American, no Asian, no Pacific Islander, 2.17% from other races, and 2.17% from two or more races. Hispanic or Latino of any race were 4.35% of the population.

There were 14 households, out of which 57.1% had children under the age of 18 living with them, 64.3% were married couples living together, 28.6% had a female householder with no husband present. The average household size was 3.29 and the average family size was 3.21.

In the CDP, the population was spread out, with 34.8% under the age of 18, 8.7% from 18 to 24, 23.9% from 25 to 44, 21.7% from 45 to 64, and 10.9% who were 65 years of age or older. The median age was 30 years. For every 100 females, there were 91.7 males. For every 100 females age 18 and over, there were 76.5 males.

The median income for a household in the CDP was $24,063, and the median income for a family was $23,125. Males had a median income of $16,250 versus $18,333 for females. The per capita income for the CDP was $6,206. There were 9.5% of families and 12.4% of the population living below the poverty line, including 20.0% of under eighteens and none of those over 64.

== Education ==
Most of it is in the Kenwood Public School school district, while a piece is in the Kansas Public Schools school district.
