= Kohala District Courthouse =

Historic Place in Hawaii County, Hawaii

- U.S. National Register of Historic Places
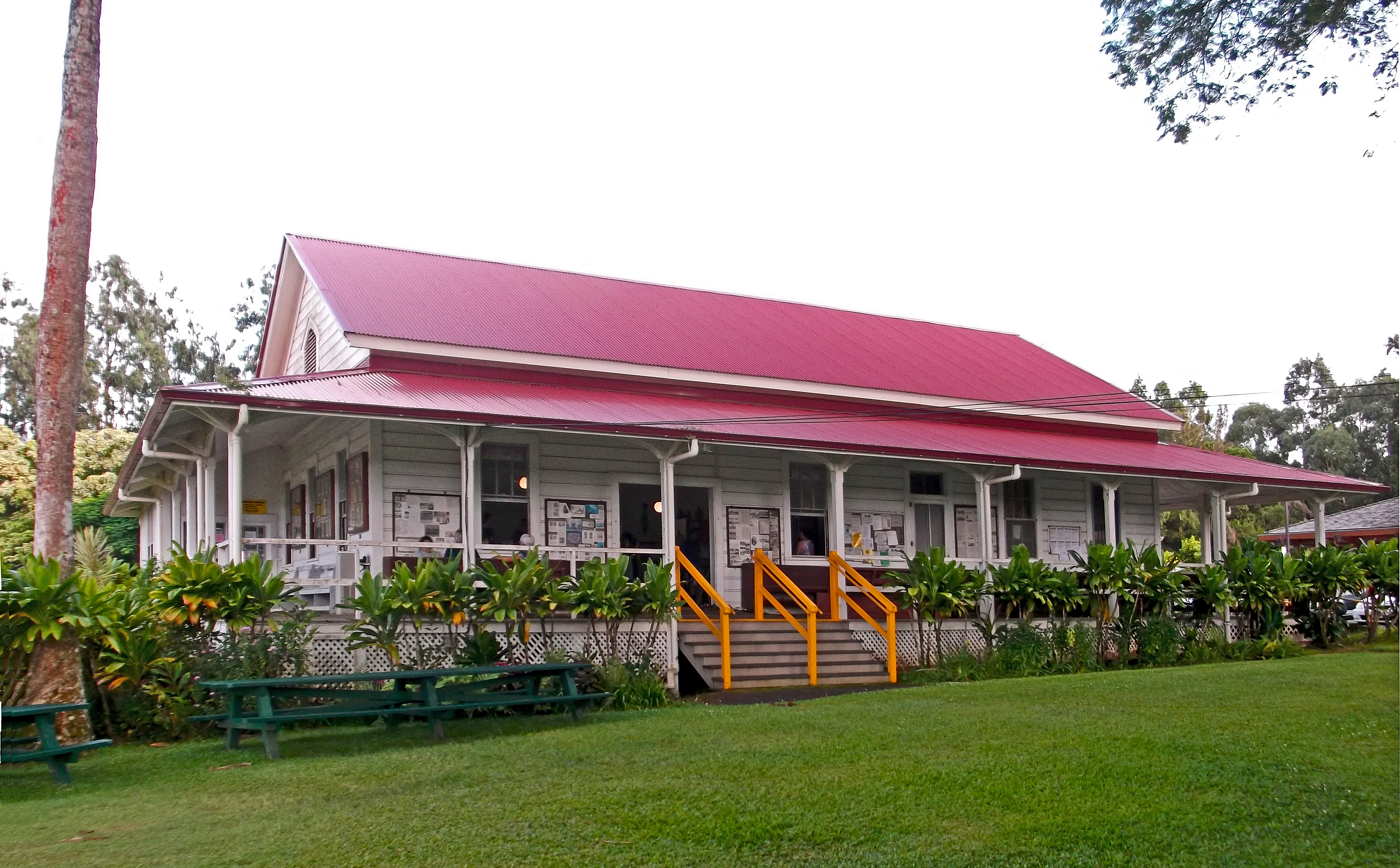

- Location within Hawaii
- Location: Government Rd., Kapaau, Hawaii
- Coordinates: 20°13′59″N 155°48′3″W
- Area: 0.5 acres (0.20 ha)
- Built: 1889
- NRHP reference No.: 79000754
- Added to NRHP: August 31, 1979

The Kohala District Courthouse is a historic courthouse in Kapaau on the island of Hawaii. The courthouse was built in 1889 to serve as a district court for the Kingdom of Hawaii; it continued to serve as a courthouse through U.S. annexation and Hawaii's eventual statehood, only closing in 1975. It was designed in the style of a traditional Hawaiian plantation house, which is reflected in its wide lanai, single-walled exterior, and corrugated metal roof; the ornamentation on its lanai sets it apart from other local buildings. A statue of Kamehameha I, who was born in Kohala, stands in front of the building.

The courthouse was added to the National Register of Historic Places on August 31, 1979.

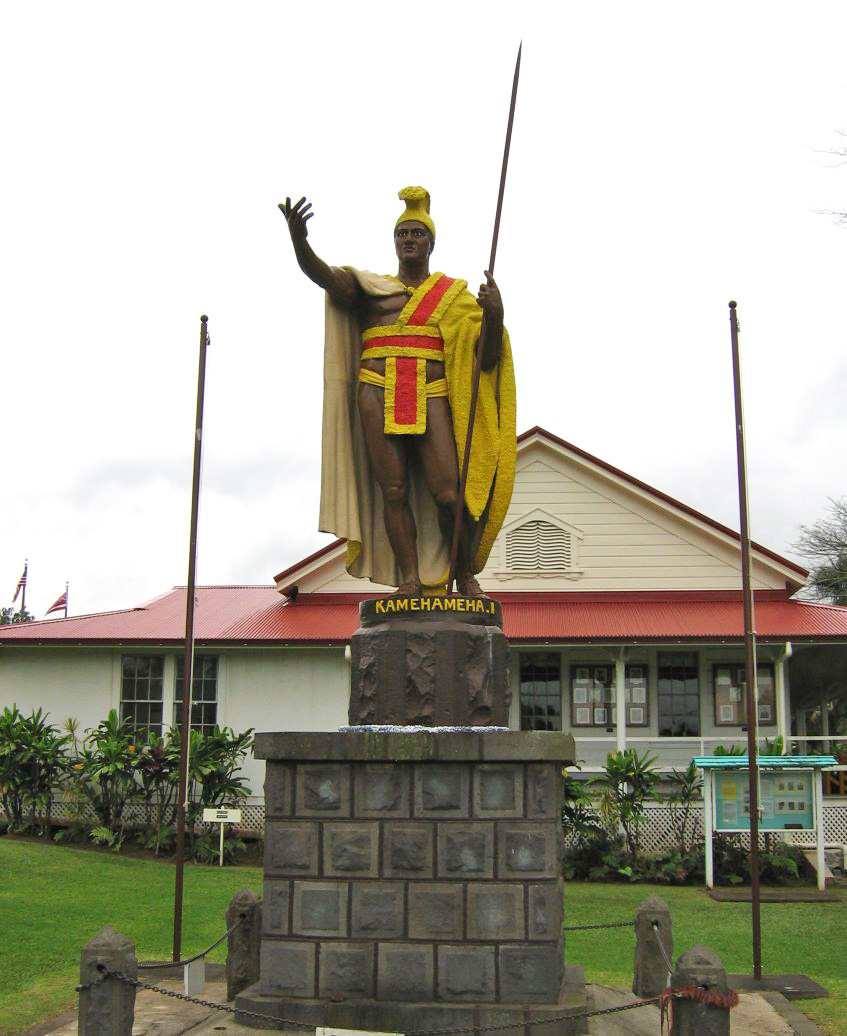
Statue of Kamehameha I
