= Lake Eucha =

Eucha Dam
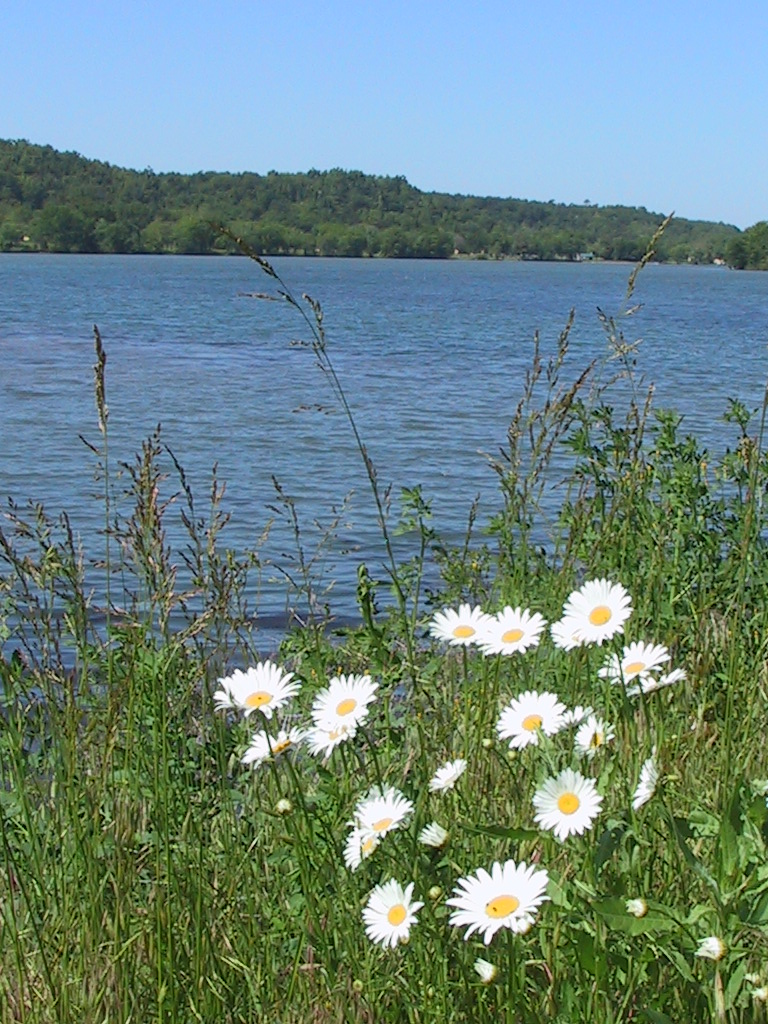

- Location within Oklahoma
- Country: United States
- Location: Delaware County, Oklahoma
- Coordinates: 36.34218°N 94.85808°W
- Opening date: 1952

Dam and spillways
- Impounds: Spavinaw Creek
- Length: 2,100 ft (640 m)
- Elevation at crest: 778 ft (237 m)

Reservoir
- Creates: Lake Eucha
- Total capacity: 80,800 acre⋅ft (99,700,000 m^{3}) nominal
- Surface area: 2,800 acres (1,100 ha)
- Maximum length: 8.5 mi (13.7 km)
- Maximum width: 0.7 mi (1.1 km)
- Normal elevation: 778 feet (237 m)

In 1952, Lake Eucha in Delaware County, Oklahoma, was created by completion of the Eucha dam on Spavinaw Creek. The nearest town is Jay, Oklahoma. This lake is owned by the City of Tulsa, Oklahoma and functions as additional storage and as a buffer for Lake Spavinaw, which is the principal municipal water source for Tulsa.

== Description ==
The lake is 8.5 miles (13.7 km) long by 0.7 miles (1.1 km) wide. with a storage capacity of 80,000 acre-feet (99,000,000 m^{3}). Its surface area is 2,800 acres (11 km^{2}) and the shoreline is about 50 miles (80 km).The dam elevation is 778 feet (0.237 km) and is 2,100 feet (0.64 km) long.

The Cherokee community of Eucha, Oklahoma was relocated to higher ground before the dam was constructed, because the lake waters were to submerge the original townsite.

Lake Eucha is also a popular place for fishing.

W. R. Holway is credited with the design and construction of both projects.

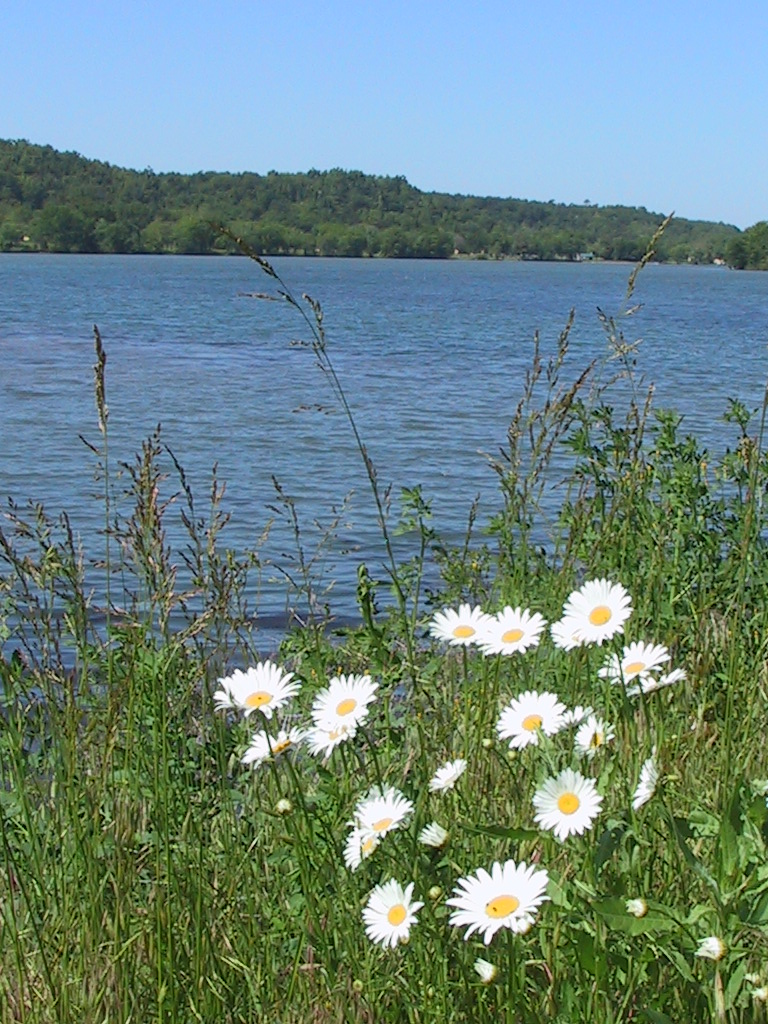
Scene along Lake Eucha
