= KRLY =

Radio station in Gravette, Arkansas, United States

- Gravette, Arkansas; United States
- Broadcast area: Northwest Arkansas, Eastern Oklahoma, Southwest Missouri, Arkansas River Valley
- Frequency: 100.3 MHz
- Branding: 100.3 Real FM

Programming
- Format: Christian Rhythmic Contemporary

Ownership
- Owner: John Brown University
- Sister stations: KLRC

History
- First air date: 1989
- Former call signs: KWMQ (1989–2001); KURM (2001–2025)

Technical information
- Licensing authority: FCC
- Facility ID: 33072
- Class: A
- ERP: 4,000 watts
- HAAT: 125 meters (410 ft)
- Transmitter coordinates: 36°25′54″N 94°30′47″W
- Translator: 101.1 K266BS (Van Buren)
- Repeater: 94.5 KFPW-FM HD2

Links
- Public license information: Public file; LMS
- Webcast: Listen live
- Website: real.fm

KRLY (100.3 FM) is a non-commercial radio station licensed to Gravette, Arkansas. The station is branded as "100.3 Real FM" and broadcasts a Christian Rhythmic Contemporary format, serving Northwest Arkansas, Eastern Oklahoma, Southwest Missouri and the Arkansas River Valley.

KRLY is owned by John Brown University and is a sister station to KLRC. It is simulcast on FM translator K266BS (101.1 FM) in Van Buren, as well as KFPW-FM's HD2 digital subchannel using HD Radio technology.

KRLY has an effective radiated power of 4,000 watts. The transmitter is located on Arkansas Highway 72 in Gravette. The station's studios and offices are located on North Broadway Street in Siloam Springs.

== History ==
KRLY signed on the air as KWMQ-FM in 1989 as a classic country format station. Starting in 2002, it was owned by KERM Inc. and broadcast a News Talk Information format as KURM-FM.

In 2024, the station was purchased by John Brown University and changed call letters to KRLY. It relaunched as "100.3 Real FM" on April 4, 2025. Real FM was previously launched by KLRC in 2017 as an online-only streaming radio station and podcast network.

In November of 2026, it was announced that Real FM would begin simulcasting on the 101.1 FM translator in Van Buren that previously carried sister station KLRC, as well as KFPW-FM's HD2 digital subchannel.
