= Delaware County, Oklahoma =

County in Oklahoma, United States

- County
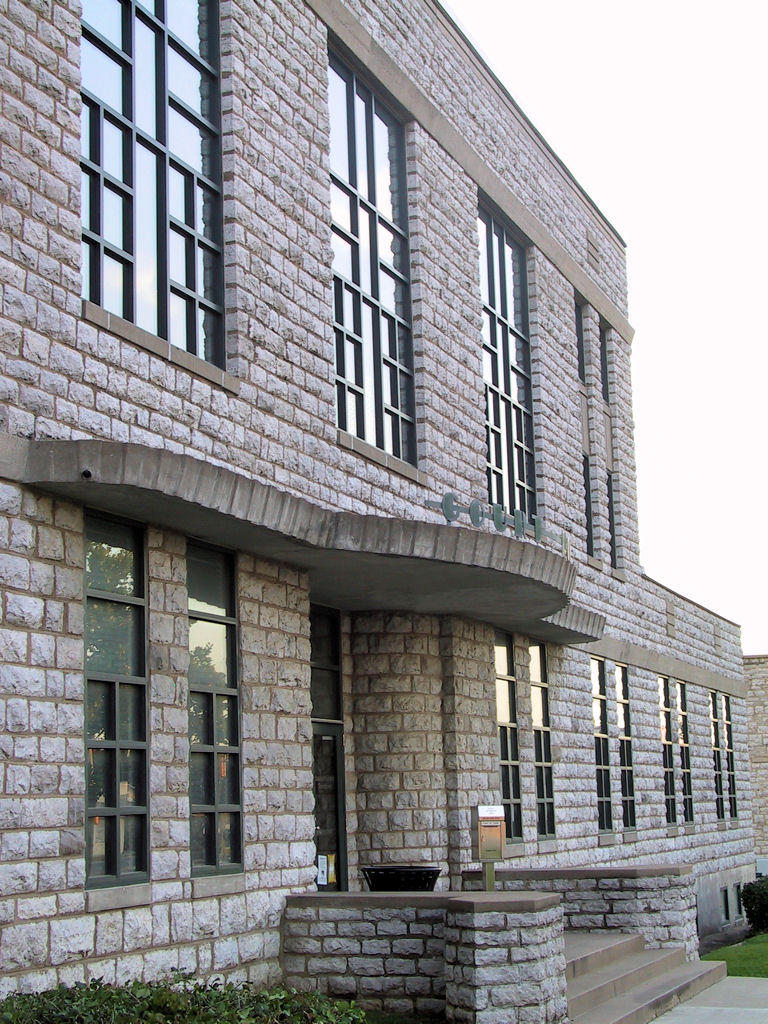
- Delaware County Courthouse

- Location within the U.S. state of Oklahoma
- Coordinates: 36°25′N 94°48′W
- Country: United States
- State: Oklahoma
- Founded: 1907
- Named for: Delaware Indians
- Seat: Jay
- Largest city: Grove

Area
  - Total: 792 sq mi (2,050 km^{2})
  - Land: 738 sq mi (1,910 km^{2})
  - Water: 54 sq mi (140 km^{2}) 6.8%

Population (2020)
  - Total: 40,397
  - Estimate (2025): 41,910 ▲
  - Density: 54.7/sq mi (21.1/km^{2})
- Time zone: UTC−6 (Central)
  - Summer (DST): UTC−5 (CDT)
- Congressional district: 2nd
- Website: delaware.okcounties.org

Delaware County is a county located in the U.S. state of Oklahoma. As of the 2020 census, its population was 40,397. Its county seat is Jay. The county was named for the Lenape (Delaware) people, who had established a village in the area prior to the Cherokees being assigned to relocate to Indian Territory in the 1830s. Delaware County was created in 1907. Prior to becoming Delaware County, a large portion of the area was known as the Delaware District of the Cherokee Nation. Today, Delaware County continues to be recognized by the Cherokee Nation as the Delaware District.

== History ==
Archaeological studies have shown that at least three different periods of prehistoric people had lived in the area covered by Delaware County. These included 23 Archaic, 17 Woodland, and 63 Eastern Villager sites. Artifacts date back between 1400 and 2000 years from the present. Many of these sites have been submerged since the creation of Grand Lake o' the Cherokees.

Few Native Americans lived in the area until the early 19th century, when the federal government began relocating tribes from the Eastern United States. About 1820, a group of Lenape, who had allied with the Cherokee against the Osage, settled Delaware Town, about two miles south of the present town of Eucha. In 1828, the Western Cherokee moved from Arkansas Territory into the area just south of the present Delaware County. In 1832, the Seneca moved from Ohio into an area that included the northeastern part of Delaware County.

The present-day county was created at statehood in 1907. Initially, Grove, the only incorporated town in the county, was designated as the county seat. However, a large number of county residents wanted a more centrally located seat. This group founded the town of Jay, where they built a wooden courthouse and won an election to move the county seat. A court suit resolved the dispute in favor of the Jay location.

== Geography ==
According to the U.S. Census Bureau, the county has a total area of 792 square miles (2,050 km^{2}), of which 54 square miles (140 km^{2}) (6.8%) are covered by water. The county lies on the western slope of the Ozark Plateau; no oil, gas, or mineral resources of economic consequence are present, but the county has abundant water.

Lake Eucha, a man-made reservoir on Spavinaw Creek, completed in 1952, lies primarily within Delaware County. Grand Lake o' the Cherokees, completed in 1940, and Lake Spavinaw, completed in 1924, are partly within Delaware County. The Neosho River and the Elk River drain the northern part of the county, while Flint Creek and the Illinois River drain the southern part.

=== Major highways ===
- U.S. Highway 59
- U.S. Highway 60
- U.S. Highway 412
  - US 412 Alt.
- Cherokee Turnpike
- State Highway 10
- State Highway 20
- State Highway 25
- State Highway 28
- State Highway 85
  - State Highway 85A
- State Highway 116
- State Highway 125
- State Highway 127
- State Highway 412A

=== Adjacent counties ===
- Ottawa County (north)
- McDonald County, Missouri northeast)
- Benton County, Arkansas (east)
- Adair County (south)
- Cherokee County (south)
- Mayes County (west)
- Craig County (northwest)

== Demographics ==
Historical population
Census	Pop.	Note	%±
1910	11,469		—
1920	13,868		20.9%
1930	15,370		10.8%
1940	18,592		21.0%
1950	14,734		−20.8%
1960	13,198		−10.4%
1970	17,767		34.6%
1980	23,946		34.8%
1990	28,070		17.2%
2000	37,077		32.1%
2010	41,487		11.9%
2020	40,397		−2.6%
2025 (est.)	41,910	▲	3.7%
U.S. Decennial Census; 1790-1960 1900-1990; 1990-2000 2010

=== 2020 census ===
As of the 2020 United States census, the county had a population of 40,397. Of the residents, 20.0% were under the age of 18 and 25.6% were 65 years of age or older; the median age was 48.0 years. For every 100 females there were 97.4 males, and for every 100 females age 18 and over there were 95.9 males.

The racial makeup of the county was 62.9% White, 0.3% Black or African American, 21.5% American Indian and Alaska Native, 1.2% Asian, 1.5% from some other race, and 12.5% from two or more races. Hispanic or Latino residents of any race comprised 4.0% of the population.

There were 16,677 households in the county, of which 25.0% had children under the age of 18 living with them and 24.5% had a female householder with no spouse or partner present. About 28.2% of all households were made up of individuals and 14.5% had someone living alone who was 65 years of age or older.

There were 24,086 housing units, of which 30.8% were vacant. Among occupied housing units, 75.5% were owner-occupied and 24.5% were renter-occupied. The homeowner vacancy rate was 3.0% and the rental vacancy rate was 9.4%.

=== 2010 census ===
As of the 2010 census, 41,487 people resided in the county, up from 37,077 people in 2000. Of the 14,838 households, 29.0% had children under living with them, 59.5% were married couples living together, 8.9 had a female householder with no husband present, and 27.4% were not families. About 24.0% of all households were made up of individuals, and 11.2% had someone living alone who was 65 or older. The average household size was 2.46 and the average family size was 2.89. In the county, the age distribution was 24.5% under 18, 6.90% from 18 to 24, 24.40% from 25 to 44, 26.70% from 45 to 64, and 17.50% who were 65 or older. The median age was 41 years. For every 100 females there were 96.50 males. For every 100 females 18 and over, there were 93.80 males.

As of 2010, the median income for a household in the county was $27,996, and the median income for a family was $33,093. Males had a median income of $25,758 versus $19,345 for females. The per capita income for the county was $15,424. About 14.10% of families and 18.30% of the population were below the poverty line, including 27.40% of those under age 18 and 11.60% of those age 65 or over.

=== 2000 census ===
In the 2000 census, 14,838 households and 10,772 families resided in the county. The population density was 50 people per square mile (19 people/km^{2}). The 22,290 housing units had an average density of 30 units per square mile (12/km^{2}). The racial makeup of the county was 70.22% White, 0.13% African American, 22.31% Native American, 0.17% Asian, 0.63% from other races, and 6.53% from two or more races. Self-identified Hispanics or Latinos made up 1.75% of the population. About 93.8% spoke English, 3.5% Cherokee, and 2.3% Spanish as their first language.

== Politics ==
Voter Registration and Party Enrollment as of June 30, 2023
Party	Number of Voters	Percentage
Democratic	5,872	22.79%
Republican	15,725	61.03%
Others	4,169	16.18%
Total	25,766	100%

United States presidential election results for Delaware County, Oklahoma
Year	Republican		Democratic		Third party(ies)	
Year	No.	%	No.	%	No.	%
1908	625	37.81%	974	58.92%	54	3.27%
1912	732	38.55%	983	51.76%	184	9.69%
1916	837	36.44%	1,227	53.42%	233	10.14%
1920	2,059	59.17%	1,282	36.84%	139	3.99%
1924	1,563	43.97%	1,729	48.64%	263	7.40%
1928	2,603	59.70%	1,706	39.13%	51	1.17%
1932	1,469	28.51%	3,684	71.49%	0	0.00%
1936	2,632	43.54%	3,398	56.21%	15	0.25%
1940	3,305	49.04%	3,417	50.70%	17	0.25%
1944	2,660	51.89%	2,373	46.29%	93	1.81%
1948	2,343	42.60%	3,157	57.40%	0	0.00%
1952	3,399	55.86%	2,686	44.14%	0	0.00%
1956	3,078	53.47%	2,679	46.53%	0	0.00%
1960	3,639	61.46%	2,282	38.54%	0	0.00%
1964	2,743	42.56%	3,702	57.44%	0	0.00%
1968	3,168	47.29%	2,129	31.78%	1,402	20.93%
1972	5,476	70.30%	2,135	27.41%	178	2.29%
1976	3,642	42.07%	4,924	56.88%	91	1.05%
1980	5,302	54.00%	4,244	43.22%	273	2.78%
1984	6,690	63.46%	3,789	35.94%	63	0.60%
1988	5,248	51.39%	4,889	47.88%	75	0.73%
1992	4,840	38.95%	4,842	38.97%	2,744	22.08%
1996	5,230	43.81%	5,094	42.67%	1,615	13.53%
2000	7,618	57.05%	5,514	41.29%	221	1.66%
2004	10,017	64.18%	5,591	35.82%	0	0.00%
2008	10,277	66.90%	5,085	33.10%	0	0.00%
2012	10,080	70.61%	4,196	29.39%	0	0.00%
2016	11,826	75.25%	3,311	21.07%	579	3.68%
2020	13,557	78.61%	3,472	20.13%	216	1.25%
2024	14,407	79.56%	3,475	19.19%	226	1.25%

== Communities ==
=== Cities ===
- Grove
- Jay

=== Towns ===
- Bernice
- Colcord
- Kansas
- Oaks
- West Siloam Springs

=== Census-designated places ===
- Brush Creek
- Bull Hollow
- Butler
- Cayuga
- Cleora
- Cloud Creek
- Copeland
- Deer Lick
- Dennis
- Dodge
- Dripping Springs
- Drowning Creek
- Flint Creek
- Indianola
- Kenwood
- Leach
- New Eucha
- Oak Hill-Piney
- Old Eucha
- Rocky Ford
- Sycamore
- Tagg Flats
- Twin Oaks
- White Water
- Zena

=== Other unincorporated communities ===
- Chloeta
- Eucha

== NRHP sites ==
Delaware County, together with Ottawa County to the north, has a large impact on tourism in Oklahoma. Said counties combined are the third-largest tourism destination in the state, following only the Oklahoma City and Tulsa metropolitan areas.

These sites are in Delaware County are listed on the National Register of Historic Places:

- Bassett Grove Ceremonial Grounds, Grove
- Beattie's Prairie, Jay
- Corey House/Hotel, Grove
- Hildebrand Mill, Siloam Springs
- Polson Cemetery, Jay
- Saline Courthouse, Rose
- Splitlog Church, Grove

== Education ==
Kindergarten-grade 12 school districts include:

- Afton Public Schools
- Colcord Public Schools
- Grove Public Schools
- Jay Public Schools
- Kansas Public Schools
- Ketchum Public Schools
- Oaks-Mission Public Schools
- Westville Public Schools

Elementary school districts include:

- Cleora Public School
- Kenwood Public School
- Leach Public School
- Moseley Public School
- Turkey Ford Public School
