= Grove, Oklahoma =

- City
- Nicknames: Round Grove, Groovy Grove, Grove America
- Motto: "Living the Grand Life!"
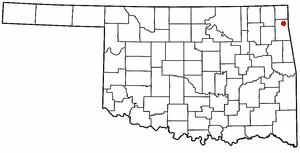
- Location of Grove, Oklahoma
- Coordinates: 36°35′34″N 94°47′02″W
- Country: United States
- State: Oklahoma
- County: Delaware

Area
  - Total: 9.51 sq mi (24.63 km^{2})
  - Land: 9.50 sq mi (24.60 km^{2})
  - Water: 0.012 sq mi (0.03 km^{2})
- Elevation: 755 ft (230 m)

Population (2020)
  - Total: 6,956
  - Density: 732.3/sq mi (282.73/km^{2})
- Time zone: UTC-6 (Central (CST))
  - Summer (DST): UTC-5 (CDT)
- ZIP codes: 74344-74345
- Area codes: 539/918
- FIPS code: 40-31600
- GNIS feature ID: 2410667
- Website: www.cityofgroveok.gov

Grove is a city in Delaware County, Oklahoma, United States. As of the 2020 census, Grove had a population of 6,956. Grove is surrounded by Grand Lake o’ the Cherokees, a professional bass fishing tournament lake and recreational hotspot during the travel season of Memorial Day to Labor Day.

== History ==
Prior to Oklahoma statehood, Grove was part of the Delaware District of the Cherokee Nation in Indian Territory. It was named for a grove of trees where it was sited. A post office, named "Brennen", was located in the limits of present-day Grove in 1888, but the city was not incorporated until the 1890s. (Note: The Encyclopedia of Oklahoma History and Culture states that the date of incorporation is uncertain, but was probably in 1895,)

Grove was aided in 1900 by connection to the Arkansas and Oklahoma Railroad (later acquired by the St. Louis-San Francisco Railway). Grove was the only incorporated town in Delaware County by the time of Oklahoma statehood in 1907, and became the county seat. However, Grove's location near the northern border of the county, and not near the county center, made it inconvenient for some county residents to visit, and after a county-wide vote in 1908, Jay was redesignated as the county seat. Grove eventually lost its railroad connection in 1940.

In recent years, the city underwent a $3.7 million park project to attract fishing events to Grand Lake, most recently attracting the 2013 and 2016 Bassmaster Classic. Grove is also home to the Grand Lake Casino, which was opened in 1988.

== Geography ==
Grove is located in northern Delaware County on the east side of the Grand Lake o' the Cherokees. U.S. Route 59 passes through the city, leading north 15 miles (24 km) to Interstate 44 near Afton and south 12 miles (19 km) to Jay, the Delaware County seat. Oklahoma State Highways 10 and 25 lead east out of town.

Grove is also located 12.6 miles (20.3 km) southeast of two Burlington Northern Santa Fe (BNSF) subdivisions, the Cherokee from Tulsa, Oklahoma to Springfield, Missouri, and the Afton, from nearby Afton Oklahoma to Kansas City's BNSF Argentine Yard. In nearby Afton lies Historic Route 66, now US-60. This historic route begins in Chicago, Illinois and ends in Santa Monica, California. It serves the states of Illinois, Missouri, Kansas, Oklahoma, Texas, New Mexico, Arizona, and California respectively.

According to the United States Census Bureau, the city has a total area of 9.3 square miles (24.0 km^{2}), of which 9.2 square miles (23.8 km^{2}) is land and 0.1 square miles (0.2 km^{2}), or 0.69%, is water.

== Demographics ==
Historical population
Census	Pop.	Note	%±
1900	314		—
1910	888		182.8%
1920	869		−2.1%
1930	804		−7.5%
1940	1,093		35.9%
1950	928		−15.1%
1960	975		5.1%
1970	2,000		105.1%
1980	3,378		68.9%
1990	4,020		19.0%
2000	5,131		27.6%
2010	6,623		29.1%
2020	6,956		5.0%
U.S. Decennial Census

=== 2020 census ===
As of the 2020 census, Grove had a population of 6,956. The median age was 52.6 years. 18.0% of residents were under the age of 18 and 33.2% of residents were 65 years of age or older. For every 100 females there were 86.3 males, and for every 100 females age 18 and over there were 84.3 males age 18 and over.

98.6% of residents lived in urban areas, while 1.4% lived in rural areas.

There were 3,102 households in Grove, of which 21.1% had children under the age of 18 living in them. Of all households, 45.9% were married-couple households, 17.2% were households with a male householder and no spouse or partner present, and 31.0% were households with a female householder and no spouse or partner present. About 33.8% of all households were made up of individuals and 20.2% had someone living alone who was 65 years of age or older.

There were 3,703 housing units, of which 16.2% were vacant. Among occupied housing units, 64.9% were owner-occupied and 35.1% were renter-occupied. The homeowner vacancy rate was 4.4% and the rental vacancy rate was 7.9%.

Racial composition as of the 2020 census
Race	Percent
White	72.5%
Black or African American	0.6%
American Indian and Alaska Native	12.7%
Asian	0.7%
Native Hawaiian and Other Pacific Islander	0.2%
Some other race	1.7%
Two or more races	11.6%
Hispanic or Latino (of any race)	4.8%

=== 2000 census ===
As of the 2000 census, there were 5,131 people, 2,286 households, and 1,490 families residing in the city. The population density was 569.2 inhabitants per square mile (219.8/km^{2}). There were 2,807 housing units at an average density of 311.4 units per square mile (120.2 units/km^{2}). The racial makeup of the city was 82.60% White, 0.08% African American, 10.19% Native American, 0.53% Asian, 0.04% Pacific Islander, 0.64% from other races, and 5.92% from two or more races. Hispanic or Latino of any race were 1.72% of the population.

There were 2,286 households, out of which 22.4% had children under the age of 18 living with them, 54.2% were married couples living together, 9.2% had a female householder with no husband present, and 34.8% were non-families. 31.6% of all households were made up of individuals, and 17.8% had someone living alone who was 65 years of age or older. The average household size was 2.15 and the average family size was 2.68.

In the city, the population was spread out, with 19.9% under the age of 18, 5.7% from 18 to 24, 19.0% from 25 to 44, 26.2% from 45 to 64, and 29.2% who were 65 years of age or older. The median age was 50 years. For every 100 females, there were 80.6 males. For every 100 females age 18 and over, there were 76.0 males.

The median income for a household in the city was $28,464, and the median income for a family was $38,347. Males had a median income of $31,908 versus $19,106 for females. The per capita income for the city was $18,351. About 9.3% of families and 14.4% of the population were below the poverty line, including 25.0% of those under age 18 and 8.4% of those age 65 or over.

== Education ==
Grove is entirely within the Grove Public Schools school district.

Schools in the Grove Public School System
Grades	School
Pre-K–Kindergarten	Grove Early Childhood Center
1–3	Grove Lower Elementary School
4–6	Grove Upper Elementary School
7–8	Grove Middle School
9–12	Grove High School; Grove Alternative Academy

Grove Oklahoma's mascot is the Ridgerunner.

Northeastern Oklahoma A&M College serves the adult community's post-secondary college educational needs. In nearby Afton, Oklahoma, the Northeast Technology Center's Afton Campus offers technical training opportunities in many educational and technical fields of studies.

== Government ==
Grove has a council-manager system of government. There are four wards within the city. Representation consist of a mayor, vice-mayor, and three other council members. The mayor represents one of the wards within the city, and the vice-mayor is an at-large member. The current council members are:

- Ed Trumbull, mayor and ward 1 councilman
- Ivan Devitt, vice-mayor
- Josh McElhaney, ward 2 councilman
- Matt Henderson, ward 3 councilman
- Martin (Marty) Dyer, ward 4 councilman

Debbie Bottoroff is the city manager.

Grove is represented in the Oklahoma State Legislature by the following individuals;

- Tom Woods (R) in Senate District 4
- Josh West (R) in House District 5

Grove is represented in the House of Representatives and Senate by the following individuals;

Senators

- Markwayne Mullin (R)
- James Lankford (R)

House of Representatives

- Markwayne Mullin (R) in the Oklahoma House District 02

== Media markets ==
- KWXC 88.9 FM broadcasts at 6,000 watts, and airs a religious format.
- KGVE 99.3 FM is a 15,000 watt radio station located in downtown Grove that offers a country music format, and public information for the community.
- Grove Sun is a bi-weekly newspaper, publishing on Tuesdays and Fridays, with the Grand Lake Magazine (published in the Friday edition).
- Grove Oklahoma is in both the Tulsa Oklahoma and Joplin Missouri media markets. The National Weather Service office in Tulsa Oklahoma provides the community with weather safety and forecast information.
- Bolt Fiber Optic provides internet, television, and telephone services through their fiber optic network to the community.

== Points of interest ==
- Grand Lake o' the Cherokees, which is formed from three rivers, the Neosho River from Kansas, the Elk and Spring Rivers from Missouri. Pensacola Dam is located between the nearby towns of Langley and Disney about 17 miles (27 km) southwest of downtown on OK-28.
- Lendonwood Gardens located at 1308 Har-Ber Road, 1 mile west of Main Street of is a collection of seven distinct botanical gardens within eight acres, including the Japanese Pavilion Garden, English Terrace Garden, Oriental Garden, Angel of Hope Garden, American Backyard Garden, and an Azalea Garden. Shaded pathways lead to more than twelve hundred different types of plants.
- Har-Ber Village Museum, which has a pioneer-era village with artifacts, and nature trails.
- Splitlog Church, also known as the Cayuga Mission Church, is about 9 miles northeast of Grove and is on the National Register of Historic Places listings in Delaware County, Oklahoma. Constructed in 1886, the church was built by a Native American with his own money. The inside displays hand-crafted wood and stones, each with a Native American symbol. The mission bells ring every day of the year.
- Corey House/Hotel, east of town on E 293 Rd, which is also on the National Register of Historic Places listings in Delaware County, Oklahoma
- Honey Creek State Park, located at 901 State Park Rd. This park offers camping, picnic and gathering gazebo's, a public swimming pool, boat access to Grand Lake.
- Sailboat Bridge, The bridge is a four lane 3,013 ft bridge on US-59, on the north side of the city that overlooks Grand Lake on the main channel of the Neosho River.
- Wolf Creek Public Park and Boating Facility, This is a public boat launching facility and park located east of US-59 on 16th Street. It is a favored location for the Pelican Festival, fishing tournaments, and a multi-use place for public events.
- Grove Civic Center is now closed.The civic center was built on the site of a now relocated Walmart. It was developed into a small shopping area with 3 clothing stores now occupying the old Civic center.
- Cherokee Grove Golf Course, located at 522 Quail Run Road, is a nine-hole public golf course and driving range near Patricia Island.
- Patricia Island Country Club, located at 4980 Clubhouse Road, is a tournament style eighteen hole private golf course with meeting areas, and easy access to Grand Lake near Patricia Island.
- Grove Sports & Recreation Complex, located 1/2 mile east of Main Street on 13th Street and Shundi. This public facility offers baseball/softball fields, a public swimming pool and water park, tennis courts, a soccer field, and a general events center.
- Grove Regional Airport. The main building is located at 335 Airport Drive, the entrance is 0.2 miles north of 3rd Street (OK-10) on Ford Road near Grove High School east of downtown. This facility offers a 5,200X75 ft asphalt runway, taxiway, apron, and hangars.

== Arts and entertainment ==
Grove is the site of the annual American Heritage Music Festival. This free event, presented by Grand Lake Festivals and the Grove Area Chamber of Commerce, typically runs multiple days in early June and may include not only live music, but also food, races and more.

== Notable people ==
- Jack Chrisman, drag racer, helped develop the Funny Car
- Roy Clark, musician and popular television personality from Hee-Haw
- Pat Dodson, former Major League Baseball player (first base)
- Scott Freeman, voice actor
- Jana Jae, country music artist, violinist/fiddler
- Sam Pittman, head coach for the Arkansas Razorbacks football team
