= Corey House/Hotel =

- U.S. National Register of Historic Places
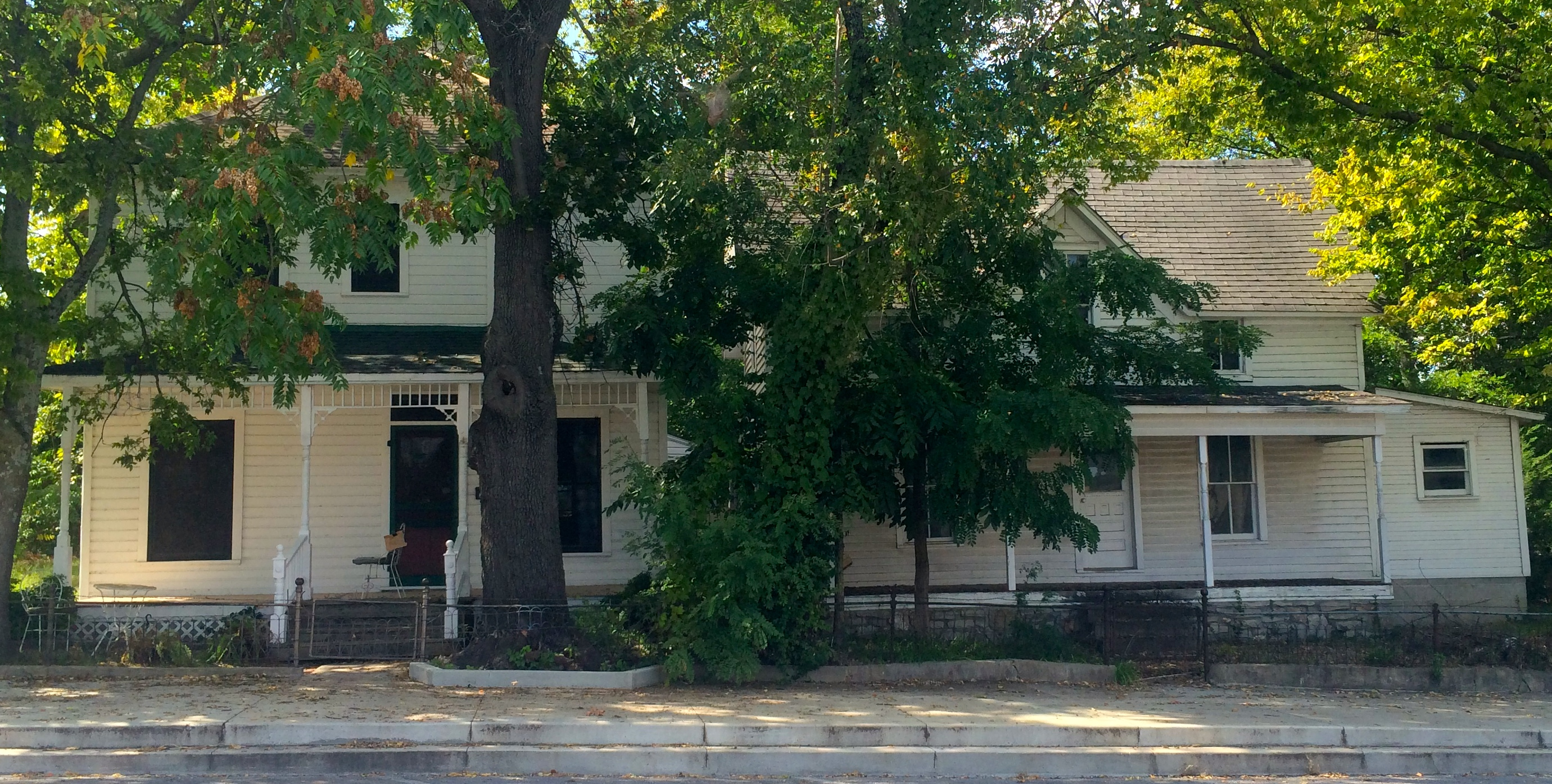

- Location within Oklahoma
- Location: N. Main at 2nd St., Grove, Oklahoma
- Coordinates: 36°35′39″N 94°46′09″W
- Area: less than one acre
- Built: 1899
- Built by: Corey, C. H.
- NRHP reference No.: 82001495
- Added to NRHP: December 17, 1982

The Corey House/Hotel, on N. Main at 2nd St. in Grove, Oklahoma, was built in 1899–1909. It was listed on the National Register of Historic Places in 1982.

It consists of two two-story wood-frame buildings, three feet apart: the Corey House built in 1899 and 28 by 39 feet (8.5 m × 11.9 m) in plan, and the Corey Hotel built in 1909 and 21 by 36 feet (6.4 m × 11.0 m) in plan. A gingerbreaded porch runs across the front and joins the two buildings.
