= Dripping Springs, Delaware County, Oklahoma =

- Census-designated place
- Location in Oklahoma
- Coordinates: 36°10′16″N 94°41′07″W
- Country: United States
- State: Oklahoma
- County: Delaware

Area
  - Total: 1.42 sq mi (3.68 km^{2})
  - Land: 1.42 sq mi (3.68 km^{2})
  - Water: 0 sq mi (0.00 km^{2})
- Elevation: 1,047 ft (319 m)

Population (2020)
  - Total: 54
  - Density: 38.0/sq mi (14.69/km^{2})
- Time zone: UTC-6 (Central (CST))
  - Summer (DST): UTC-5 (CDT)
- FIPS code: 40-21672
- GNIS feature ID: 2408689

Dripping Springs is an unincorporated community and census-designated place (CDP) in Delaware County, Oklahoma, United States. The population was 50 at the 2010 census, up from the figure of 41 recorded in 2000.

== Geography ==
Dripping Springs is located in southeastern Delaware County and is bordered to the south by the Adair County line, to the north by the U.S. Route 59/412 highway, and to the southeast by Dripping Springs Branch, flowing through Natural Falls State Park. The park itself was known as Dripping Springs until the state acquired the tract in 1990. The community of Dripping Springs is 8 miles (13 km) east of the town of Kansas, and 9 miles (14 km) west of Siloam Springs.

According to the United States Census Bureau, the CDP has a total area of 1.4 square miles (3.7 km^{2}), all land.

== Demographics ==
Historical population
Census	Pop.	Note	%±
2000	41		—
2010	50		22.0%
2020	54		8.0%
U.S. Decennial Census

As of the census of 2000, there were 41 people, 13 households, and 8 families residing in the CDP. The population density was 29.2 inhabitants per square mile (11.3/km^{2}). There were 15 housing units at an average density of 10.7/sq mi (4.1/km^{2}). The racial makeup of the CDP was 34.15% White, 48.78% Native American, and 17.07% from two or more races. Hispanic or Latino of any race were 2.44% of the population.

There were thirteen households, out of which 46.2% had children under the age of 18 living with them, 46.2% were married couples living together, 15.4% had a female householder with no husband present, and 30.8% were non-families. 30.8% of all households were made up of individuals, and 7.7% had someone living alone who was 65 years of age or older. The average household size was 3.15 and the average family size was 3.78.

In the CDP, the population was spread out, with 36.6% under the age of 18, 9.8% from 18 to 24, 36.6% from 25 to 44, 9.8% from 45 to 64, and 7.3% who were 65 years of age or older. The median age was 29 years. For every 100 females, there were 105.0 males. For every 100 females age 18 and over, there were 116.7 males.

The median income for a household in the CDP was $14,375, and the median income for a family was $20,000. Males had a median income of $13,750 versus $0 for females. The per capita income for the CDP was $7,479. There were 25.0% of families and 12.1% of the population living below the poverty line, including no under eighteens and 57.1% of those over 64.

== Education ==
It is in the Moseley Public School school district.
