= Jay, Oklahoma =

- City
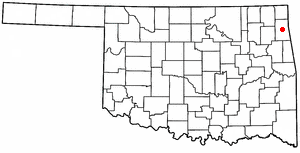
- Location of Jay, Oklahoma
- Coordinates: 36°25′38″N 94°47′44″W
- Country: United States
- State: Oklahoma
- County: Delaware

Area
  - Total: 3.33 sq mi (8.63 km^{2})
  - Land: 3.33 sq mi (8.63 km^{2})
  - Water: 0 sq mi (0.00 km^{2})
- Elevation: 1,027 ft (313 m)

Population (2020)
  - Total: 2,425
  - Density: 730/sq mi (281/km^{2})
- Demonym: Jayite
- Time zone: UTC-6 (Central (CST))
  - Summer (DST): UTC-5 (CDT)
- ZIP code: 74346
- Area codes: 539/918
- FIPS code: 40-37650
- GNIS feature ID: 2410135
- Website: City website

Jay is a city in and the county seat of Delaware County, Oklahoma, United States. As of the 2020 census, Jay had a population of 2,425. Almost 40% of its residents are Native American, thus Jay is home to numerous Cherokee tribal offices and a health clinic for the Delaware District of the Cherokee Nation. Jay has a council-manager system of government. Becki Farley is the mayor with Kyle Stump serving as Vice Mayor.

The city is celebrated as the Huckleberry Capital of the World and has been host to the annual Huckleberry Festival each July 4 weekend since 1967.

== History ==
Jay was named for Jay Washbourne, a nephew of Stand Watie and grandson of an early-day Cherokee missionary. The town is the county seat of Delaware County, having won that distinction from Grove, Oklahoma in a special county seat election on December 8, 1908. The 1910–11 Legislature made Grove a County Court Town, and provided for two court terms each year. On June 27, 1911, the Supreme Court of Oklahoma ruled in favor of Jay, and on January 5, 1912, the County Commissioners ordered the records to be moved to Jay. On May 10, 1913, the courthouse in Jay was burned, destroying most of the county records. The post office was established May 19, 1909. Jay incorporated in 1939.

== Geography ==
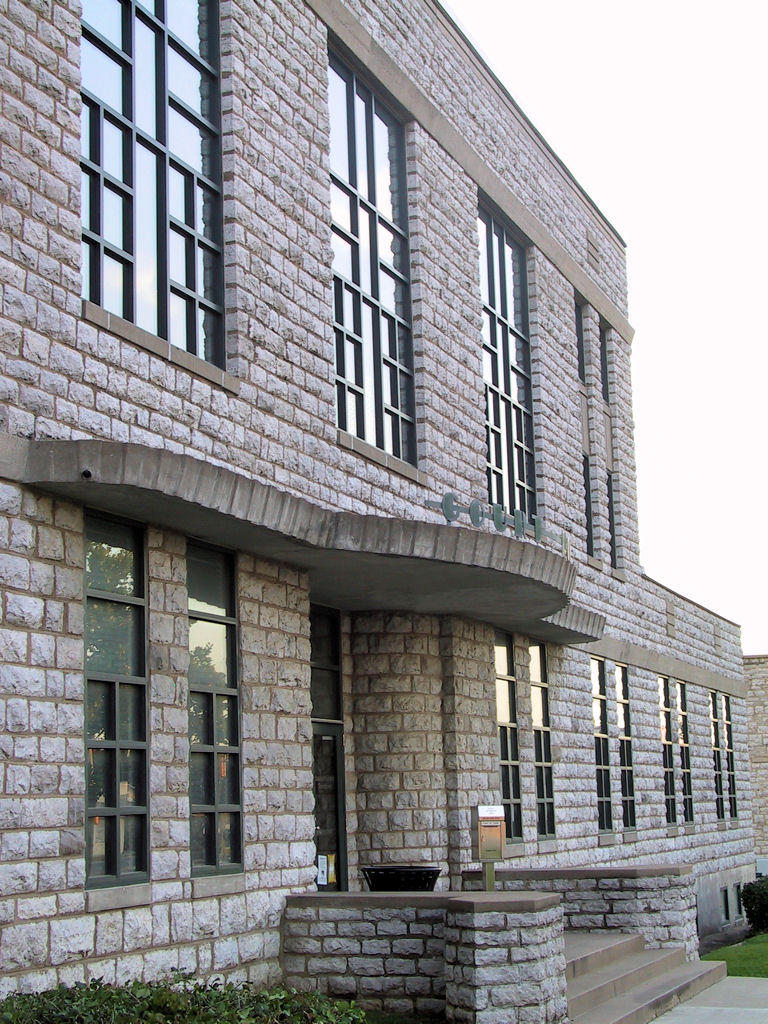
East facade of Delaware County Courthouse. Built 1941.

Jay is located in the oak and hickory forests of the Ozark Plateau.

According to the United States Census Bureau, the city has a total area of 3.2 square miles (8.3 km^{2}), all land. The Cherokee name for Jay is Dlaygvi (Bluejay Place).

Jay is at the intersection of U.S. Route 59 and Oklahoma State Highway 20, southeast of Grand Lake of the Cherokees and northeast of Lake Eucha.

Jay is atypical in Oklahoma history because the townsite and layout were located and platted specifically for its purpose as a county seat. It is not located on a river, major road or railway line as were most Oklahoma towns of the late 1800s and early 1900s.

Around 1908, the Delaware County Improvement Association hired a survey team to pinpoint the exact location of the center of the county. They pinpointed allotment land belonging to Thomas Oochaleta, a full-blood Cherokee. Since acquiring title to a full-blood's allotment would require a lengthy federal legal procedure, the committee shifted their attention to the allotment adjoining Oochaleta's on the east, a parcel belonging to committee member Claude L. "Jay" Washbourne. As a mixed-blood Cherokee, Washbourne was exempt from the federal policy restricting the sale or transfer of his land. He gave ten acres on which to construct a town. The town was designed, reserving a central block for a courthouse. The committee quickly constructed a frame building and then applied to the U.S. Postal Service for a post office, submitting the required three town names for consideration. The names submitted were "Center," "Jay," and "Washbourne." Postal authorities chose Jay for its brevity.

== Demographics ==
Historical population
| Census | Pop. | Note | %± |
|---|---|---|---|
| 1940 | 741 | | — |
| 1950 | 697 | | −5.9% |
| 1960 | 1,120 | | 60.7% |
| 1970 | 1,594 | | 42.3% |
| 1980 | 2,180 | | 36.8% |
| 1990 | 2,220 | | 1.8% |
| 2000 | 2,482 | | 11.8% |
| 2010 | 2,448 | | −1.4% |
| 2020 | 2,425 | | −0.9% |
U.S. Decennial Census

=== 2020 census ===
As of the 2020 census, Jay had a population of 2,425. The median age was 37.7 years. 24.5% of residents were under the age of 18 and 19.0% of residents were 65 years of age or older. For every 100 females there were 92.6 males, and for every 100 females age 18 and over there were 87.9 males age 18 and over.

0% of residents lived in urban areas, while 100.0% lived in rural areas.

There were 940 households in Jay, of which 33.3% had children under the age of 18 living in them. Of all households, 37.1% were married-couple households, 19.1% were households with a male householder and no spouse or partner present, and 36.0% were households with a female householder and no spouse or partner present. About 33.6% of all households were made up of individuals and 15.5% had someone living alone who was 65 years of age or older.

There were 1,114 housing units, of which 15.6% were vacant. Among occupied housing units, 53.1% were owner-occupied and 46.9% were renter-occupied. The homeowner vacancy rate was 2.9% and the rental vacancy rate was 15.4%.

Racial composition as of the 2020 census
| Race | Percent |
|---|---|
| White | 42.4% |
| Black or African American | 0.1% |
| American Indian and Alaska Native | 41.3% |
| Asian | 0.4% |
| Native Hawaiian and Other Pacific Islander | 0% |
| Some other race | 2.4% |
| Two or more races | 13.4% |
| Hispanic or Latino (of any race) | 5.7% |

=== 2000 census ===
As of the census of 2000, there were 2,482 people, 954 households, and 609 families residing in the city. The population density was 767.2 inhabitants per square mile (296.2/km^{2}). There were 1,051 housing units at an average density of 324.9 per square mile (125.4/km^{2}). The racial makeup of the city was 54.43% White, 0.56% African American, 36.50% Native American, 0.04% Asian, 1.89% from other races, and 6.57% from two or more races. Hispanic or Latino of any race were 3.55% of the population.

There were 955 households, out of which 33.0% had children under the age of 18 living with them, 40.9% were married couples living together, 17.8% had a female householder with no husband present, and 36.1% were non-families. 32.6% of all households were made up of individuals, and 15.3% had someone living alone who was 65 years of age or older. The average household size was 2.48 and the average family size was 3.13.

In the city, the population was spread out, with 28.3% under the age of 18, 9.0% from 18 to 24, 27.0% from 25 to 44, 20.1% from 45 to 64, and 15.5% who were 65 years of age or older. The median age was 34 years. For every 100 females, there were 87.7 males. For every 100 females age 18 and over, there were 82.0 males.

The median income for a household in the city was $21,875, and the median income for a family was $25,592. Males had a median income of $20,212 versus $17,039 for females. The per capita income for the city was $10,700. About 21.4% of families and 25.9% of the population were below the poverty line, including 35.1% of those under age 18 and 22.3% of those age 65 or over.

== Education ==
It is in the Jay Public Schools school district.

== Notable people ==
- Linda Hughes O'Leary, Cherokee politician
- Tommy Morrison, former world heavyweight boxing champion
- Ty Powell, former NFL Linebacker
- Buzz Wetzel, baseball player
- Jessy Grizzle, robotics engineer

== See also ==
- National Register of Historic Places listings in Delaware County, Oklahoma
