= List of unincorporated communities in Oklahoma =

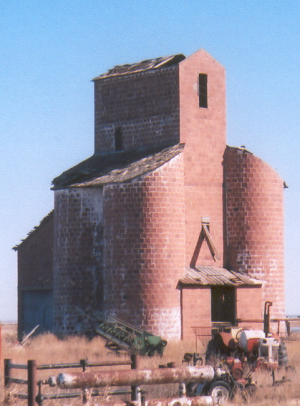
This innovative grain elevator was built circa 1920 near the small community of Ingersoll.

Unincorporated communities in Oklahoma do not have a formally organized municipal government. Rather, residents rely on the county government for services. State law allows unincorporated communities, under certain conditions, to incorporate or join another municipality

Many unincorporated communities were at one time incorporated but for various reasons no longer have a municipal government. Depopulation during the 1930s and 40s caused the loss of many communities and some no longer exist even as unincorporated communities. In Oklahoma, incorporated municipalities may petition for dissolution or be declared dissolved after missing two concurrent municipal elections (held April of odd numbered years). Platted unincorporated communities do have some right under the laws of Oklahoma that non-platted communities do not enjoy. A town plat is also one of the conditions required for incorporation.

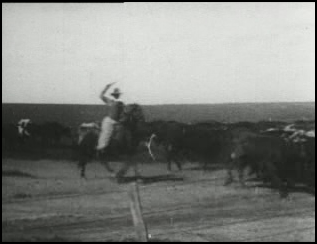
Driving Cattle to Pasture near Bliss.

Although unincorporated communities have no municipal governments, they may organize their own water districts or fire districts and tax citizens to support them. Additionally, many communities have school districts with elected school boards. Also, several unincorporated communities still have their own post offices.

Many unincorporated communities (such as Boggy Depot, Tuskahoma, and Skullyville) played important roles in the development of Oklahoma and others, especially those with schools and post offices, continue to be important centers in rural Oklahoma.

"Oklahoma Municipal Government" from the Oklahoma Almanac published by the Oklahoma Department of Libraries is the source document for this list. Additional communities have been added using Wikipedia articles which cite authoritative sources. Geographic coordinates, if known, are provided for those place names which are unlikely to be communities.

== A ==
	Community	County	Comments
	Acme	Grady	34°47′56″N 98°01′09″W
	Adams	Texas
	Adamson	Pittsburg
	Adel	Pushmataha	34°47′56″N 98°01′09″W
	Agawan	Grady
	Ahloso	Pontotoc
	Ahpeatone	Cotton	34°20′52″N 98°33′04″W
	Akins	Sequoyah
	Albany	Bryan
	Albert	Caddo
	Alden	Caddo	34°58′31″N 98°35′07″W
	Aledo	Dewey
	Alfalfa	Caddo
	Allison	Bryan
	Alma	Stephens
	Alpers	Carter	34°29′33″N 97°23′14″W
	Alsuma	Tulsa
‡	Altona	Kingfisher	35°46′59″N 98°10′16″W
†	Alwinn	Stephens
	Anchor	Wagoner	35°50′08″N 95°24′11″W
	Antioch	Garvin
	Apperson	Osage
	Apple	Choctaw	34°07′39″N 95°25′03″W
	Arlington	Lincoln
	Arpelar	Pittsburg
	Artillery Village	Comanche
†	Atlee	Jefferson	34°05′37″N 97°37′57″W
†	Aubrey	Creek
	Avery	Lincoln
	Avoca	Pottawatomie
	Aydelotte	Pottawatomie
† Geographic or historic reference undetermined.
‡ Identified as abandoned by at least one source.

== B ==
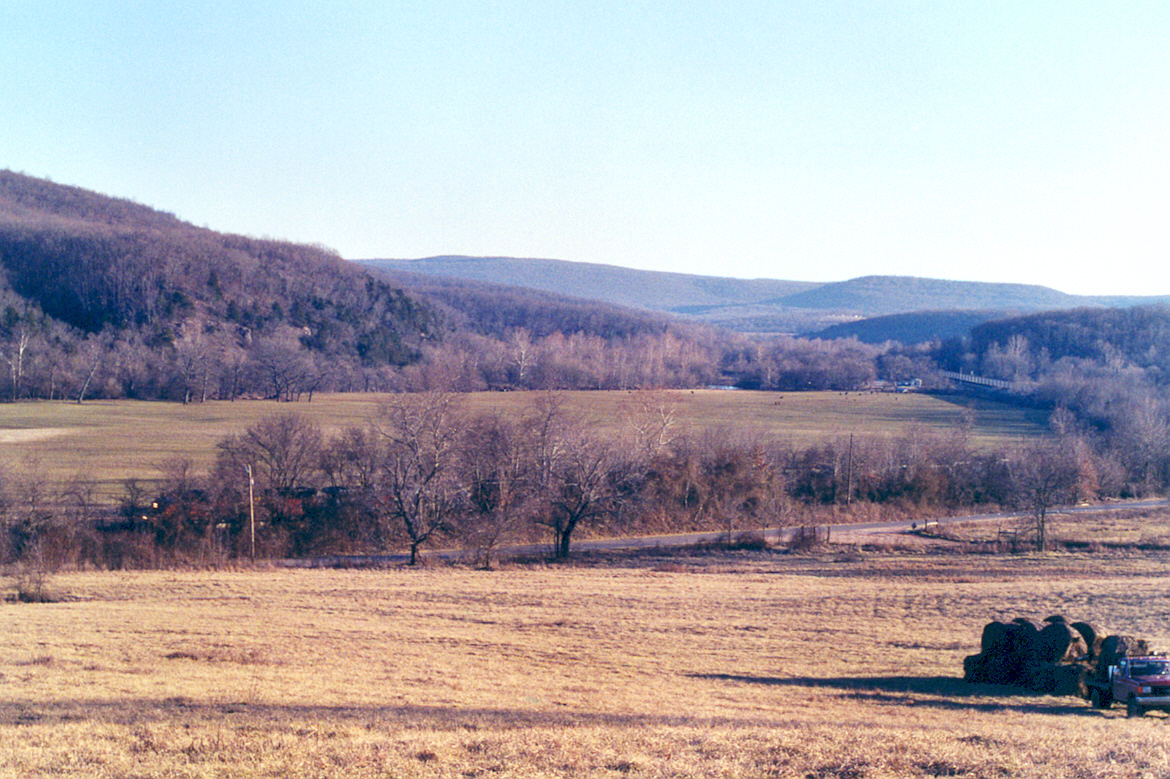
Bunch, Oklahoma, sets in the background near Sallisaw Creek in the Cookson Hills.

	Community	County	Comments
	Babbs	Kiowa
	Bache	Pittsburg
	Bacone	Muskogee
	Bailey	Grady
	Baker	Texas
	Baldhill	Okmulgee	35°44′25″N 95°50′14″W
	Balko	Beaver
	Ballard	Adair
	Banner	Canadian
	Banty	Bryan
	Barber	Cherokee	35°45′26″N 94°52′04″W
†	Barnes	Logan	(Locale-USGS)
	Baron	Adair
‡	Bartlett	Okmulgee
	Battiest	McCurtain
	Baugh	Pawnee
	Baum	Carter
	Beachton	McCurtain
	Beckett	Stephens	(Alternate name for Sunray, Oklahoma.)
	Bee	Johnston
	Beland	Muskogee
	Bell	Adair
	Bellemont	Pottawatomie
	Belva	Woodward	36°29′56″N 98°58′30″W
†	Belvue	Creek
	Belzoni	Pushmataha	34°11′08″N 95°27′56″W
	Bengal	Latimer
	Bentley	Atoka
	Berlin	Roger Mills
	Berwyn	Carter	(Present day Gene Autry, Oklahoma.)
	Bethel	Comanche
	Bethel	McCurtain
‡	Bidding Springs	Adair	(See Golda's Mill.)
	Big Cedar	Le Flore	(Stream-USGS)
†	Big Spring	Hughes	35°10′27″N 96°14′50″W (Church)
	Binkley	Lincoln	(Railroad siding and switch.)
	Bison	Garfield
	Blackgum	Sequoyah
	Blanco	Pittsburg
	Bliss	Noble	(Now known as Old Bliss, Oklahoma.)
	Blocker	Pittsburg
	Blue	Bryan
	Bluff	Choctaw
	Boatman	Mayes
	Boehler	Atoka	34°10′15″N 95°53′01″W
	Boggy Depot	Atoka
†	Bois D'Arc	Kay	(Stream-USGS.)
	Bokhoma	McCurtain
†	Bond	McIntosh
	Boone	Caddo
‡	Boss	McCurtain
†	Boulevard	Cleveland
	Bowden	Creek
	Bowlin Spring	Craig
	Bowring	Osage
	Boyd	Beaver
	Box	Sequoyah
	Braden	Le Flore
	Brady	Garvin	34°37′22″N 97°16′57″W
	Brent	Sequoyah
	Briartown	Muskogee
	Briggs	Cherokee
	Brinkman	Greer
	Britton	Oklahoma	(Incorporated part of Oklahoma City.)
	Brock	Carter
	Brooken	Haskell
	Brown	Bryan
	Broxton	Caddo
	Brush Hill	McIntosh
	Brushy	Sequoyah
	Bryant	Okmulgee
†	Buffalo	McCurtain
†	Buffalo Valley	Latimer
	Bugtussle	Pittsburg
	Bunch	Adair
	Burmah	Dewey
	Burneyville	Love
	Burns	Washita
	Burwell	McCurtain	34°11′09″N 95°09′05″W
	Bushyhead	Rogers
	Butner	Seminole.
† Geographic or historic reference undetermined.
‡ Identified as abandoned by at least one source.

== C ==
This abandoned W.S. Kelly gas station and general store in Cogar was used in a scene from the 1988 movie, Rainman.

	Community	County	Comments
	Cade	Bryan
	Cairo	Coal	34°35′26″N 96°07′55″W
	Calhoun	Le Flore
	Calida	Pawnee	36°11′35″N 96°17′53″W
†	Cambria	Latimer
	Cambridge	Kiowa	35°04′22″N 99°12′19″W
	Camp Houston	Woods
	Canadian Shores	Pittsburg
	Caney Ridge	Cherokee
	Capitol Hill	Oklahoma	(Incorporated as part of Oklahoma City.)
	Cardin	Ottawa
	Carlton	Blaine	36°00′52″N 98°30′55″W (Also spelled Carleton.)
	Carpenter	Roger Mills
	Carson	Hughes
	Carters Corner	McIntosh
	Carters Landing	Cherokee
	Cartersville	Haskell
	Cartwright	Bryan
	Casey	Pawnee	36°16′57″N 96°40′27″W
	Castaneda	Cimarron	36°52′52″N 102°31′17″W
	Catale	Rogers	36°33′39″N 95°22′19″W (Railroad siding–PO closed in 1933.)
	Catesby	Ellis
	Cayuga	Delaware
	Cedar Crest	Mayes
†	Cedar Lake	Canadian
	Center	Pontotoc
†	Center City	Oklahoma
†	Center Point	Atoka
	Centerview	Pottawatomie
	Centralia	Craig
	Ceres	Noble
‡	Cerrogordo	McCurtain	(PO closed in 1958.)
	Cestos	Dewey
	Chance	Adair
	Charleston	Harper	(See abandoned communities-USGS.)
	Chase	Muskogee	(See Beland.)
	Cherry Tree	Adair
	Chester	Major
	Chewey	Adair
	Cheyenne Valley	Major
	Chigley	Murray
	Childers	Nowata
	Chilli	Latimer
	Chilocco	Kay	(See Chilocco Indian School.)
†	Chisney	Pottawatomie
	Chitwood	Grady
	Chloeta	Delaware
	Chockie	Atoka
	Choska	Wagoner
	Christie	Adair
	Cimarron City	Logan
‡	Cisco	McCurtain	(PO closed in 1916.)
	Citra	Hughes
	Clarita	Coal
	Clarksville	Wagoner
	Clayton Lake	Pushmataha	(Reservoir-Clayton Lake (Oklahoma)-USGS)
‡	Clear Lake	Beaver	(PO closed in 1944.)
	Clebit	McCurtain
	Clemscot	Carter
	Cleora	Delaware
	Clothier	Cleveland
	Cloud Chief	Washita
	Cloudy	Pushmataha
	Clyde	Grant
	Coalton	Okmulgee
	Cobb	Bryan
	Cogar	Caddo
	Coleman	Johnston
	Concho	Canadian
	Connerville	Johnston
	Conrad	Cimarron	(Railroad siding and switch.)
	Conser	Le Flore
	Cookietown	Cotton
	Cookson	Cherokee
	Copeland	Delaware
	Corbett	Cleveland
	Corinne	Pushmataha
	Corum	Stephens
	Cottonwood	Coal
	Cottonwood	Sequoyah
	Council	Oklahoma	(See Council Grove.)
	Countyline	Stephens/ Carter
	Courtney	Love
	Cove Acres	Comanche
‡	Cowden	Washita	35°14′52″N 98°42′43″W (PO closed in 1908.)
	Cox City	Grady
	Craig	McCurtain	34°02′18″N 94°37′44″W
	Craig	Pittsburg	34°50′25″N 95°37′39″W
‡	Cravens	Latimer	(PO closed 1916.)
	Crawford	Roger Mills
	Crekola	Muskogee
†	Creosote	Choctaw
	Creta	Jackson	34°31′00″N 99°32′59″W
	Criner	McClain
	Crusher	Murray
	Crutcho	Oklahoma
	Crystal	Atoka
	Crystal Lakes	Major
	Cumberland	Marshall
	Curchece	Pawnee
	Curtis	Woodward
† Geographic or historic reference undetermined.
‡ Identified as abandoned by at least one source.

== D ==
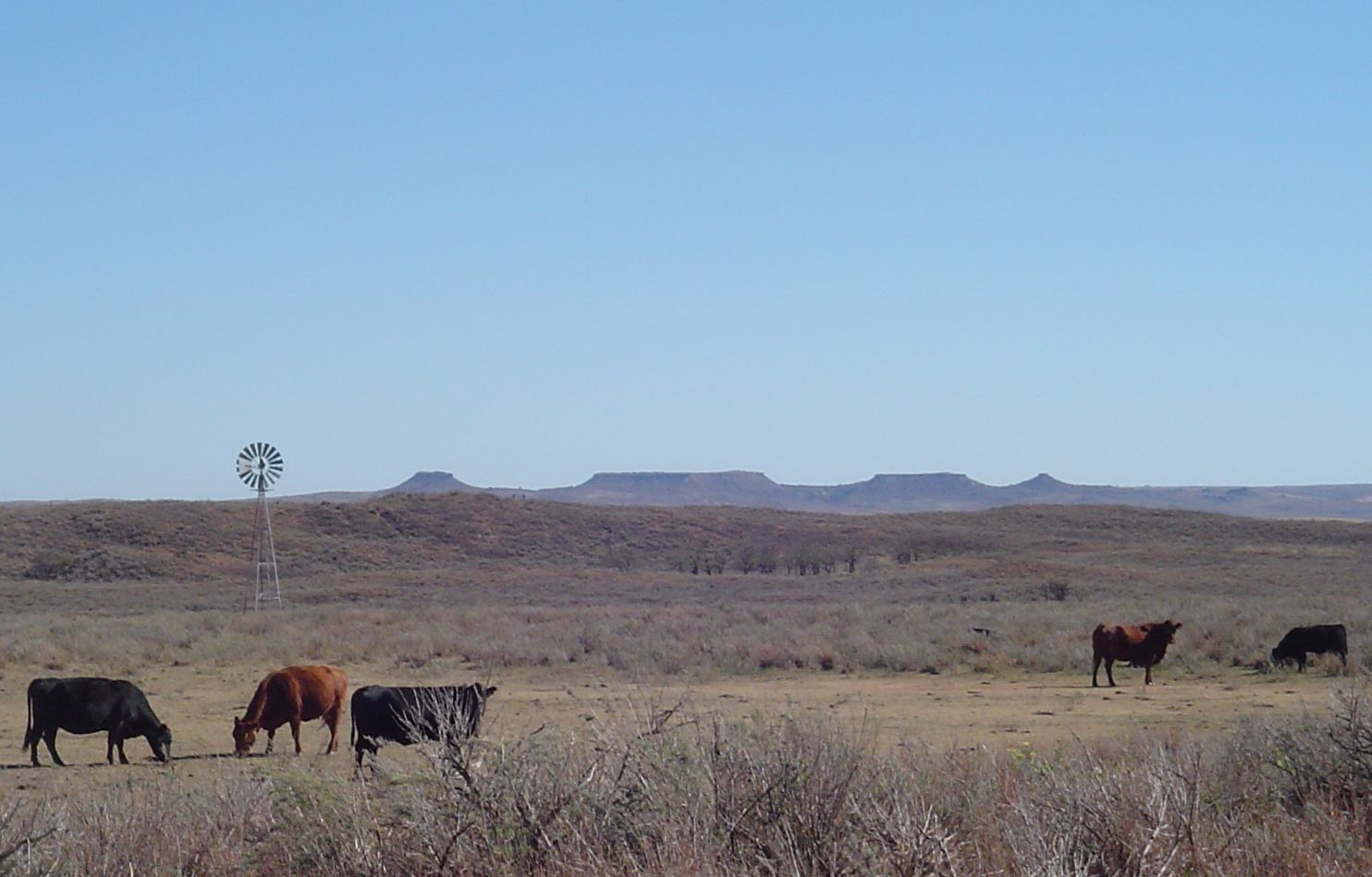
The Antelope Hill, a National Historic Place, lie just north of Durham.

	Community	County	Comments
	Daisy	Atoka
	Dale	Pottawatomie
	Damon	Latimer
	Dane	Major	36°13′01″N 98°37′10″W
	Darrow	Blaine	36°05′53″N 98°23′18″W
	Darwin	Pushmataha
	Dawson	Tulsa	(Incorporated as part of Tulsa.)
	Degnan	Latimer	34°56′50″N 95°21′12″W
	Dela	Pushmataha
	Delhi	Beckham
	Dempsey	Roger Mills	35°31′03″N 99°49′22″W
	Dennis	Delaware
	Dewright	Seminole	35°05′15″N 96°39′31″W
	Dighton	Okmulgee
	Dillard	Carter
	Dixon	Seminole
‡	Doby Springs	Harper
	Dodge	Delaware
	Dotyville	Ottawa
	Dow	Pittsburg
	Doyle	Stephens
	Drake	Murray	34°23′52″N 96°57′03″W
	Driftwood	Alfalfa
	Dripping Springs	Carter
	Dripping Springs	Delaware
	Drumb	Latimer	34°55′47″N 95°28′52″W
	Dunbar	Love
	Dunjee Park	Oklahoma
	Durham	Roger Mills
	Durwood	Carter
‡ Identified as abandoned by at least one source.

== E ==
Community
County
Comments

Eagle City
Blaine

Eagletown
McCurtain

Earl
Johnston

†
Eastborough
Wagoner

East Duke
Jackson
(Variant name for town of Duke.)

East Jesse
Coal/ Pontotoc

East Ninneka
Grady
(Variant name for town of Ninnekah.)

Eastside
Custer

Eddy
Kay
36°43′54″N 97°27′31″W
(PO closed in 1957.)

Eden
Payne
36.2028259, −97.0919822

Dissolved mid-century

Edgewater Park
Comanche

Edna
Creek

Eldon
Cherokee

†
Elk Plaza
Stephans

Elmwood
Beaver

†
Emerson Center
Cotton

Emet
Johnston

Empy
Pawnee

Enos
Marshall

Enterprise
Haskell

Enville
Love

Eram
Okmulgee

Estella
Craig

Ethel
Pushmataha

Etna
Garfield
(Railroad siding.)

Etta
Cherokee

Eucha
Delaware

Eva
Texas

†
Ewing
Custer

† Geographic or historic reference undetermined.

== F ==
Community	County	Comments
Falconhead	Love
Falfa	Latimer
Fame	McIntosh
Farmers Hill	McCurtain
Farris	Atoka
Fay	Dewey
Featherston	Pittsburg
Felker	McCurtain
Felt	Cimarron
Fewell	Pushmataha
Fillmore	Johnston
Finley	Pushmataha
Fisher	Tulsa
Fittstown	Pontotoc
Fivemile Corner	Cotton
Fleetwood	Jefferson	33°53′48″N 97°51′04″W (PO closed in 1961.)
Floris	Beaver
Flynn	Oklahoma	(Incorporated as part of Oklahoma City.)
Foley	Custer	(Railroad siding and switch.)
Folsom	Johnston
Forest Hill	Le Flore
Forney	Choctaw
Forrester	Le Flore
Fort Reno	Canadian	(See Fort Reno (Oklahoma) for the fort.)
Four Corners		(Locale—name of several in Oklahoma.)
Fox	Carter
Franklin	Cleveland
Fransen	Custer
Frisco	Pontotoc
Frogville	Choctaw
Fugate	Atoka

== G ==
	Community	County	Comments
	Gaar Corner	Pontotoc
	Gansel	Noble	(Railroad siding and switch.)
	Garden Grove	Pottawatomie
	Garland	Haskell
	Gay	Choctaw
†	Georgetown	Muskogee
	Gerlach	Woodward	(Railroad siding and switch.)
	Gibbon	Grant	36°56′34″N 97°58′56″W (PO closed in 1945.)
	Gibson	Wagoner
	Gideon	Cherokee
	Gilmore	Le Flore
	Glendale	Le Flore
	Glover	McCurtain
	Golden	McCurtain
	Goodland	Choctaw
	Goodwater	McCurtain
	Goodwin	Ellis	36°11′48″N 99°56′06″W (PO closed in 1916.)
	Gowen	Latimer
	Grady	Jefferson
	Graham	Carter
	Grandview Heights	Muskogee
	Grant	Choctaw
	Gray	Beaver
	Gray Horse	Osage
	Greasy	Adair
	Green Pastures	Oklahoma
	Greenville	Love
	Greenwood	Pushmataha
	Griggs	Cimarron
	Grimes	Roger Mills
	Gulftown	Okmulgee
†	Gyp	Blaine	(Historical community-USGS.)
	Gypsy	Creek
† Geographic or historic reference undetermined.

== H ==
Haywood, Oklahoma, in the coal mining district of Pittsburg County, was named for radical labor leader, Big Bill Haywood.

	Community	County	Comments
	Hale	Tulsa	(See abandoned communities-USGS.)
	Hammon Junction	Roger Mills	(Abandoned railroad siding and switch.)
	Hanson	Sequoyah
	Happyland	Pontotoc
	Harden City	Pontotoc
	Hardy	Kay
	Harjo	Pottawatomie
	Harmon	Ellis
	Harmony Star	Rogers
	Harris	McCurtain
	Harrison	Sequoyah	(See abandoned communities-Shirk.)
	Haw Creek	Le Flore
	Hawley	Grant
	Hazel Dell	Pottawatomie	35°26′56″N 97°00′01″W
	Hayward	Garfield
	Haywood	Pittsburg
	Heman	Woods	36°32′06″N 98°56′38″W
	Hennepin	Garvin
	Herring	Roger Mills	35°36′36″N 99°31′04″W
	Hess	Jackson
	Hester	Greer
	Hewitt	Carter
	Hext	Beckham
	Higgins	Latimer	34°48′41″N 95°26′01″W
	Hill	Le Flore
	Hilltop	Hughes	34°56′05″N 96°10′54″W
	Hockerville	Ottawa
	Hodgen	Le Flore
	Hogshooter	Washington
‡	Holley Creek	McCurtain	33°58′41″N 94°49′00″W
	Hollow	Craig	36°53′15″N 95°16′12″W
	Hollywood Corners	Cleveland
	Homer	Pontotoc
	Homestead	Blaine
	Honobia	Le Flore
	Hontubby	Le Flore
	Hopeton	Woods
	Hough	Texas
	Houston	Creek
	Hoyt	Haskell
	Hulen	Cotton
	Humphreys	Jackson
	Hyde Park	Muskogee
‡ Identified as abandoned by at least one source.

== I ==
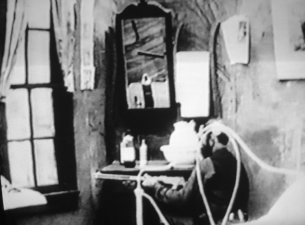
Ingalls, Oklahoma, was the site of a famous shoot-out between U.S. Marshals and the Doolin-Dalton Gang depicted in this scene from the 1915 silent film, The Passing of the Oklahoma Outlaws.

Community	County	Comments
Imo	Garfield
Independence	Custer
Indian Meadows	Cherokee
Ingalls	Payne
Ingersoll	Alfalfa
Iona	Murray
Iron Post	Creek	35°43′35″N 96°24′20″W
Iron Stob Corner	McCurtain
Irving	Jefferson
Isabella	Major

== J ==
	Community	County	Comments
‡	Jackson	Bryan
	Jacktown	Lincoln
	Jesse	Pontotoc
	Jimtown	Love
‡	Joburn	Atoka
†	Joe	Tulsa	(NOTE: Joe Station in Tulsa, Co. no longer exists per USGS.)
	Jollyville	Murray
	Joy	Murry
	Jumbo	Pushmataha.
† Geographic or historic reference undetermined.
‡ Identified as abandoned by at least one source.

== K ==
Community	County	Comments
Keefeton	Muskogee
Keetonville	Rogers
Kellond	Pushmataha
Kellyville	Ottawa
Kengle	Tulsa
Kent	Choctaw	34°06′47″N 95°37′23″W
Kenton	Cimarron
Kenwood	Delaware
Kiamichi	Pushmataha
Kiersey	Bryan
Kosoma	Pushmataha
Kullituklo	McCurtain
Kusa	Okmulgee

== L ==
	Community	County	Comments
	Lacey	Kingfisher
	Lafayette	Haskell
	Lake	Tulsa	(Incorporated place in Tulsa County.)
	Lake Creek	Greer
	Lake Ellsworth Addition	Comanche
	Lake Hiwasse	Oklahoma
	Lake Humphreys	Stephans	(Reservoir—Lake Humphreys (Oklahoma).)
	Lakeside	Bryan
	Lakeside Village	Comanche
	Lake Station	Tulsa	(Historical-USGS.)
	Lake Valley	Washita
	Lake West	Bryan	33°53′45″N 95°53′08″W
	Lane	Atoka
	Lark	Marshall
	Last Chance	Okfuskee
	Latta	Pontotoc
	Leach	Delaware
	Leader	Pontotoc
	Lebanon	Marshall
	Lecox	Oklahoma	(Railroad siding.)
‡	Lefeber	Tulsa
	Lela	Pawnee
	Lenna	McIntosh
	Lenora	Dewey
	Leonard	Tulsa
	Lequire	Haskell
	Lenox	Le Flore
	Lewisville	Haskell
	Liberty		(Different communities in Bryan, Sequoyah, and Stephens counties).
†	Limestone	Latimer
†	Limestone	Rogers
	Limestone Gap	Atoka
	Lincolnville	Ottawa
	Little	Seminole
	Little Axe	Cleveland
	Little Chief	Osage
	Little City	Marshall
	Little Ponderosa	Beaver
	Loder	Oklahoma	(Railroad siding-USGS.)
	Lodi	Latimer	35°00′33″N 95°02′32″W
	Logan	Beaver
‡	Lona	Haskell	35°09′21″N 95°17′23″W
	Lone Oak	Sequoyah
	Lone Tree	Okmulgee
	Long	Sequoyah
	Longtown	Pittsburg
	Lookout	Woods
	Lost City	Cherokee
	Lovedale	Harper	(Railroad siding-Shirk.)
	Lovell	Logan
	Loving	Le Flore
	Lowrey	Cherokee
	Lucien	Noble
‡	Lugert	Kiowa
	Lula	Pontotoc
	Lutie	Latimer
†	Lynn Addition	Osage
	Lynn Lane	Tulsa
	Lyons	Adair
† Geographic or historic reference undetermined.
‡ Identified as abandoned by at least one source.

== M ==
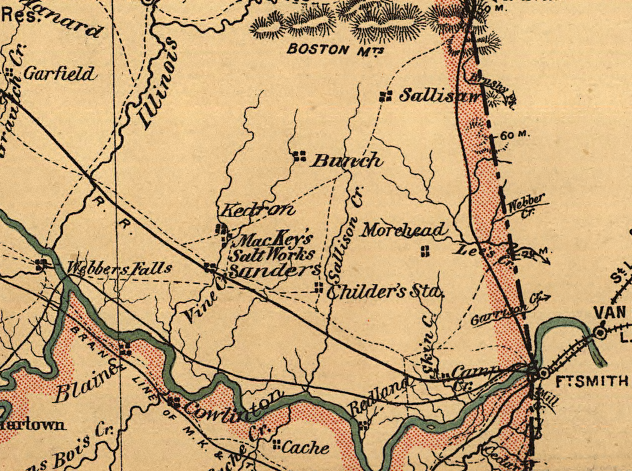
Salt, an important commodity in Indian Territory, was produced near the present community of McKey.

	Community	County
†	MacArthur Park	Comanche	(Housing addition in Lawton.)
	McBride	Marshall
	McCord	Osage
	McKey	Sequoyah
	McKiddyville	Cleveland
	McKnight	Harmon
	McLain	Muskogee
	McMillan	Marshall
	McWillie	Alfalfa
	Madge	Harmon
	Maguire	Cleveland
	Manard	Cherokee
	Maple	Sequoyah
	Martin	Muskogee
	Marty	Jackson
	Mason	Okfuskee
†	Matthew	Choctaw
	Matoy	Bryan
	Maxwell	Pontotoc
	Mayfield	Beckham
†	May Ridge	Oklahoma
	Mazie	Mayes
†	Medio	Tulsa
	Meers	Comanche
	Mehan	Payne
	Mellette	McIntosh
	Melvin	Cherokee
	Meridian	Stephens
	Merrick	Lincoln
	Merritt	Beckham
	Messer	Choctaw
	Micawber	Okfuskee
	Middleberg	Grady
	Midlothian	Lincoln
	Midway	Atoka/ Coal
	Milfay	Creek
	Miller	Pushmataha
	Milo	Carter
	Milton	Le Flore
	Mingo	Tulsa
	Monroe	Le Flore
†	Montclair Addition	Le Flore
	Moodys	Cherokee
	Moon	McCurtain
	Moorewood	Custer
	Moseley	Delaware
	Mound Grove	McCurtain
	Mount Herman	McCurtain
	Mount Zion	McCurtain
	Mouser	Texas
	Moyers	Pushmataha
	Mudsand	Choctaw
†	Mule Barn	Pawnee
	Murphy	Mayes
	Muse	Le Flore
† Geographic or historic reference undetermined.

== N ==
	Community	County
	Nani-chito	McCurtain
	Narcissa	Ottawa
	Nardin	Kay
	Nashoba	Pushmataha
	Natura	Okmulgee
	Navina	Logan
	Nebo	Murray
	Needmore	Cleveland
	Neff	Le Flore
	Nelagony	Osage
	Neodesha	Wagoner
	Newalla	Oklahoma
	New Cordell	Washita	(Official name of Cordell, Oklahoma.)
	New Liberty	Beckham
	New Lima	Seminole
	New Mannford	Creek
	New Oberlin	Choctaw
	Newport	Carter
†	New Ringold	McCurtain
	New Woodville	Marshall	(Variant name for Woodville-USGS.)
	Nicut	Sequoyah
	Nida	Johnston
	Niles	Canadian
	Nobletown	Seminole
	Noel	Woods	(Railroad siding.)
	Non	Hughes
	Norris	Latimer
†	Northeast	Tulsa
	North McAlester	Pittsburg
†	Northside	Tulsa
†	North Valliant	McCurtain
†	Northwest	Oklahoma
	Nowhere	Caddo	(NOTE: Located at the SE end of Fort Cobb Reservoir, 8.9 km(5.5 mi) SSW of Albert and 22 km(14 mi) NW of Anadarko. U.S. Board on Geographic Names decisions, either decisions referenced after Phase I data compilation, or staff research on non-controversial names.-USGS.)
	Numa	Grant
	Nuyaka	Okmulgee
† Geographic or historic reference undetermined.

== O ==
	Community	County
	Oak Grove	Murray
	Oak Grove	Pawnee
	Oak Grove	Payne
	Oak Hill	McCurtain
	Oakhurst	Tulsa and Creek
	Oakman	Pontotoc
	Oakridge	Creek
	Oberlin	Bryan
	Octavia	Le Flore
	Oglesby	Washington
	Oil Center	Pontotoc
	Oil City	Carter
	Okesa	Osage
	Okfuskee	Okfuskee
	Oleta	Pushmataha
	Olive	Creek
	Olney	Coal
	Omega	Kingfisher
	Onapa	McIntosh
	Oneta	Wagoner
	Oney	Caddo
	Ord	Choctaw
	Orienta	Major
†	Orin	Grant
	Orion	Major
	Orr	Love
†	Osage	Kay
	Oscar	Jefferson
	Oswalt	Love
	Otoe	Noble
	Overbrook	Love
	Owanda	Oklahoma
† Geographic or historic reference undetermined.

== P ==
	Community	County
	Page	Le Flore
	Panola	Latimer
	Panoma	Texas
	Paradise View	Mayes
	Parker	Coal
	Park Hill	Cherokee
	Parkland	Lincoln
†	Parkview	Tulsa
†	Parthena	Creek
	Patterson	Latimer
	Paw Paw	Sequoyah
	Payne	McClain
	Payson	Lincoln
	Pearson	Pottawatomie
	Pearsonia	Osage
	Peckham	Kay
	Peggs	Cherokee
	Pernell	Garvin
	Pershing	Osage
	Peterman Ridge	Pawnee
	Petersburg	Jefferson
	Petros	Le Flore
	Pettit	Cherokee
	Pettit Bay	Cherokee
	Pharoah	Okfuskee
	Phelps	Caddo
	Pickens	McCurtain
	Pickett	Pontotoc
	Pierce	McIntosh
	Pine Ridge	Caddo
	Piney	Adair
†	Pin Oaks Acres	Mayes
	Platter	Bryan
	Pleasant Hill	McCurtain
	Plucketville	McCurtain
	Pocasset	Grady
	Pollard	McCurtain
	Pontotoc	Johnston
	Pooleville	Carter
	Port	Washita
	Porter Hill	Comanche
	Powell	Marshall
	Prattville	Tulsa
	Preston	Okmulgee
	Price	Tulsa
	Proctor	Adair
	Pruitt	Carter
	Pumpkin Center	Comanche
	Pumpkin Center	Muskogee
	Pumpkin Center	Okmulgee
	Purdy	Garvin
	Pyramid Corners	Craig
† Geographic or historic reference undetermined.

== Q ==
	Community	County
	Quail Creek	Oklahoma	(Incorporated as part of Oklahoma City)
	Qualls	Cherokee
†	Quick	Sequoyah
	Quinlan	Woodward
† Geographic or historic reference undetermined.

== R ==
	Community	County
†	Rabornville	Pawnee
	Raiford	McIntosh
†	Rayford	Murray
	Reagan	Johnston
	Reck	Carter
	Red Fork	Tulsa
	Red Hill	Haskell
	Redland	Sequoyah
	Reed	Greer
†	Regal	Comanche
	Reichert	Le Flore
	Remus	Pottawatomie/ Seminole
	Retrop	Beckham/ Washita
	Rhea	Dewey
	Richards Spur	Comanche
	Richland	Canadian
	Richville	Pittsburg
†	Rigsby	Pawnee
	Ringold	McCurtain
	Roberta	Bryan
	Rock Island	Le Flore
	Rocky Mountain	Adair
	Rocky Point	Wagoner
	Roll	Roger Mills
	Rose	Mayes
	Rossville	Lincoln
	Rubottom	Love
	Rufe	McCurtain
	Russell	Greer
	Russellville	Pittsburg
	Russett	Johnston
	Ryder	Johnston
† Geographic or historic reference undetermined.

== S ==
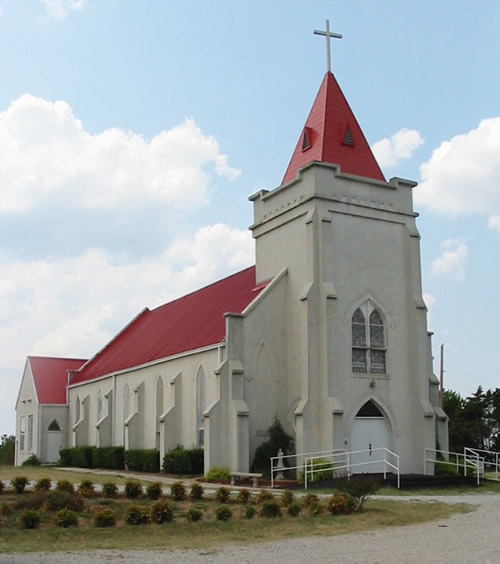
Sacred Heart, Oklahoma, the birthplace of author Tony Hillerman, was established in 1879 as a mission for the Pottawatomie Indians.

	Community	County
	Sacred Heart	Pottawatomie
	Saddle Mountain	Kiowa
	Sageeyah	Rogers
	Salem	McIntosh and Okmulgee
	Salt Fork	Grant
	Sams Point	Pittsburg
	Sandbluff	Choctaw
	Sand Point	Bryan
	Sans Bois	Haskell
	Santa Fe	Stephens
	Sardis	Pushmataha
†	Saundra	Woodward
	Sawyer	Choctaw
	Schulter	Okmulgee
	Scipio	Pittsburg
	Scraper	Cherokee
	Scullin	Murray
	Scullyville	Le Flore
	Sedan	Kiowa
	Selman	Harper
	Sequoyah	Rogers
	Seward	Logan
	Shady Grove	Sequoyah
	Shay	Marshall
	Shea	Garfield	(Railroad switch.)
†	Sheridan	Comanche
†	Sheridan	Tulsa
	Sherwood	McCurtain
	Shinewell	McCurtain
	Shirk	Tulsa	(Railroad siding and switch.)
†	Shopton	Muskogee
	Short	Sequoyah
	Shults	McCurtain
	Sickles	Caddo
	Silver City	Creek
	Slapout	Beaver
	Smithville	McCurtain
	Snow	Pushmataha
	Sobol	Pushmataha
	Southard	Blaine
†	Southeast	Oklahoma
†	Southeast	Tulsa
†	South Haven	Tulsa
†	Southside	Tulsa
†	Southwest	Oklahoma
	Spaulding	Hughes
	Speer	Choctaw
	Spelter City	Okmulgee
	Spencerville	Choctaw
	Spring Creek	Caddo
	Springlake	Oklahoma
	Stafford	Custer
	Stanley	Pushmataha
	Stapp	Le Flore
	Star	Haskell
	Stealy	McClain
	Stecker	Caddo
	Steedman	Pontotoc
	Steel Junction	McCurtain
†	Steen	Garfield
	Stella	Cleveland
†	Stockyards City	Oklahoma
	Stonebluff	Wagoner
	Stones Corner	Wagoner
†	Stony Point	Adair
†	Stony Point	Le Flore
	Story	Garvin
	Straight	Texas
	Sturgis	Cimarron
	Sullivan Village	Comanche
	Summerfield	Le Flore
	Sumner	Noble
	Sumpter	Kay
†	Sungate	Comanche
	Sunkist	Choctaw
	Sunray	Stephens
	Sunrise	Okmulgee
†	Sunshine Valley	Ottawa
	Supply	Woodward
†	Sutton	Osage
†	Survey Hills	Texas
	Svoboda	Kiowa
	Sweethome	Lincoln
	Sweetwater	Roger Mills/ Beckham
† Geographic or historic reference undetermined.

== T ==
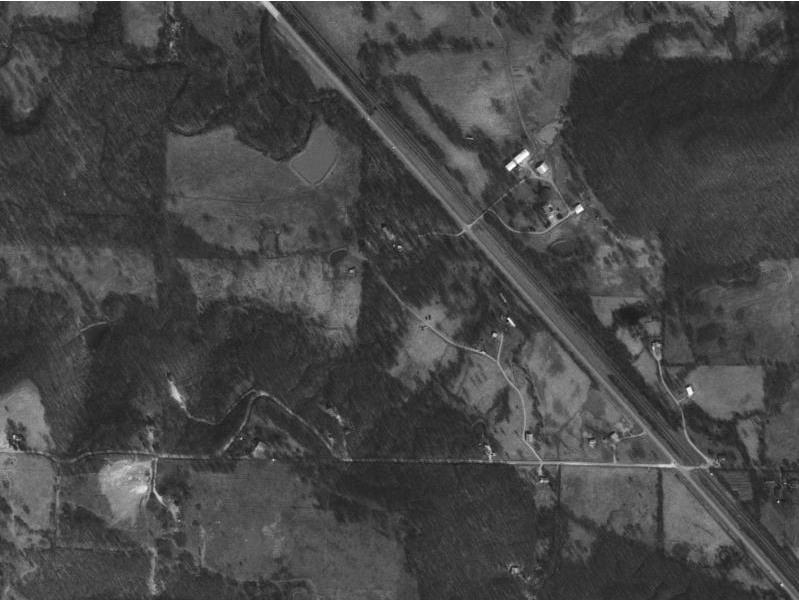
In this aerial view Tiawah nestles in the Tiawah Hills along State Highway 88 in Rogers County.

	Community	County
	Tabler	Grady
	Tablerville	McCurtain
	Tahona	Le Flore
	Tailholt	Cherokee
	Tallant	Osage
	Tangier	Woodward
	Taupa	Comanche
	Taylor	Beckham
	Taylor	Cotton
	Teresita	Cherokee
	Texanna	McIntosh
	Texola	Beckham
	Ti	Pittsburg
	Tiawah	Rogers
†	Timber Brook	Wagoner
†	Timberlane	Pawnee
	Tiner	McCurtain
	Titanic	Adair
	Tom	McCurtain
	Topsy	Delaware	(Variant name for Chloeta, Oklahoma-USGS)
	Tracy	Seminole
	Trousdale	Pottawatomie
	Troy	Johnston
	Tucker	Le Flore
	Turkey Ford	Delaware
	Turley	Tulsa
	Turner	Love
	Turpin	Beaver
	Tuskahoma	Pushmataha
	Tuskegee	Creek
	Tussy	Carter/ Garvin
	Twin Hills	Okmulgee
	Twin Oaks	Delaware
	Tyler	Marshall
† Geographic or historic reference undetermined.

== U ==
	Community	County
	Ulan	Pittsburg.
	Ultima Thule	McCurtain
	Unger	Choctaw
†	Union	Cleveland
	Union	Kingfisher
	Union	Tulsa
	Union Hill	Pontotoc
	Union Valley	Pontotoc
†	Uniroyal	Carter
	Utica	Bryan
† Geographic or historic reference undetermined.

== V ==
Community	County
Vamoosa	Seminole
Vanoss	Pontotoc
Vernon	McIntosh
Victory	Jackson
Vinco	Payne
Vinson	Harmon
Virgil	Choctaw
Vista	Pottawatomie
Vivian	McIntosh
† Geographic or historic reference undetermined.

== W ==
	Community	County
	Wade	Bryan
	Wallville	Garvin
	Ward Springs	Pittsburg
	Wardville	Atoka
	Warner	Muskogee
	Warren	Jackson
	Washita	Caddo
	Waterloo	Logan/ Oklahoma
	Watova	Nowata
	Watson	McCurtain
	Wauhillau	Adair
	Weathers	Pittsburg
	Webb	Dewey
	Welling	Cherokee
	Welon	Jackson	(Railroad switch.)
	Welty	Okfuskee
†	Wes	Pawnee
†	West Park	Oklahoma
	West Seneca	Ottawa
†	Westside	Muskogee
†	Westside	Oklahoma
	Wheatland	Oklahoma
	Wheeless	Cimarron
	Whippoorwill	Osage
	White Bead	Garvin
	White Eagle	Kay
	Whitefield	Haskell
	White Oak	Cherokee
	White Oak	Craig
	Whitesboro	Le Flore
†	Whittier	Tulsa
	Wildcat Point	Cherokee
†	Wild Horse	Osage
	Williams	Le Flore
†	Williams	Rogers
	Willis	Marshall
	Willow Springs	Oklahoma
	Wilson	Okmulgee
	Wilzetta	Lincoln
	Winganon	Rogers
	Wirt	Carter
	Wolco	Osage
	Wolf	Seminole
	Woodford	Carter
†	Woodland View	Tulsa
	Woodville	Marshall
	Woods	Oklahoma
	Woody Chapel	McClain
	Wybark	Muskogee and Wagoner
†	Wye	Pottawatomie
† Geographic or historic reference undetermined.

== Y ==
Community	County
Yanush	Latimer
Yarnaby	Bryan
Yewed	Alfalfa
Yost Lake	Payne	(Lakeside community, called Yost, or Youst-Shirk.)
Yuba	Bryan

== Z ==
Community	County
Zafra	Le Flore
Zaneis	Carter
Zeb	Cherokee
Zena	Delaware
Zincville	Ottawa
Zion	Adair
Zoe	Le Flore

== Bibliography ==
- Oklahoma Department of Libraries. "Oklahoma Municipal Government". Oklahoma Almanac. (accessed February 11, 2007)
- Oklahoma Historical Society. Chronicles of Oklahoma. (accessed February 11, 2007)
- Oklahoma State Department of Education. "School Districts Database" (accessed February 11, 2007)
- Shirk, George H. Oklahoma Place Names. Norman: University of Oklahoma Press, 1987: ISBN 0-8061-2028-2 .
- Supreme Court of Oklahoma. "Oklahoma Statutes Citationized".Oklahoma State Courts Network (OSCN) (accessed February 11, 2007)
- United States Census Bureau Fact Finder. ''Fact Sheet'' search. (accessed February 11, 2007)
- United States Geological Survey. Geographic Names Information System. (accessed February 11, 2007)
- United States Postal Service. ZIP Code Lookup. (accessed February 11, 2007)
- Abandoned Oklahoma
