= Gilmore, Oklahoma =

- Unincorporated community
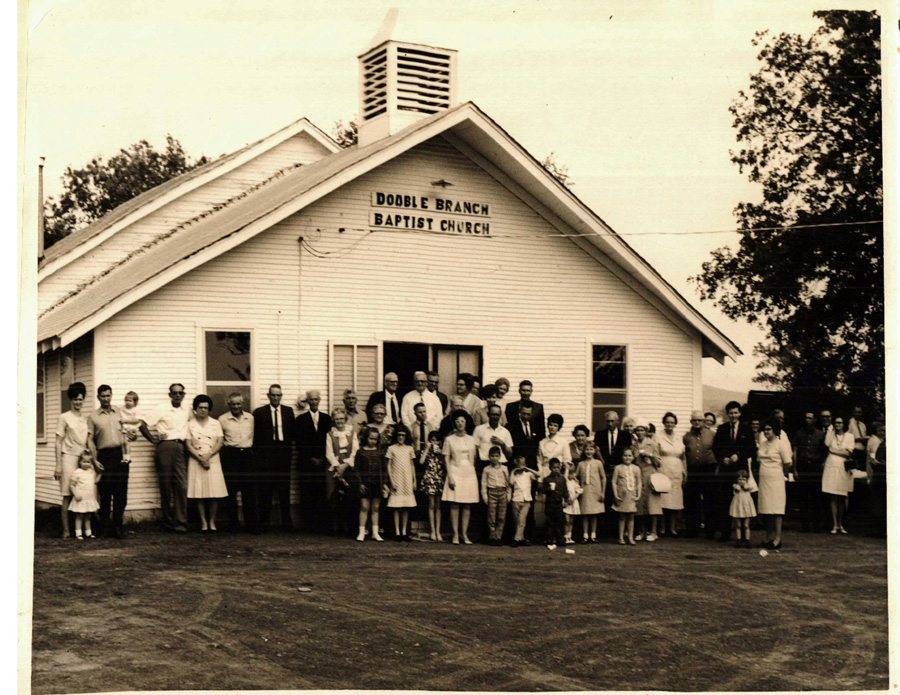
- Double Branch Baptist Church in Gilmore, c. 1960

- Location within Oklahoma Location within the United States
- Coordinates: 35°3′5.71″N 94°31′27.12″W
- Country: United States
- State: Oklahoma
- County: Le Flore
- Elevation: 538 ft (164 m)
- Time zone: UTC-6 (Central (CST))
  - Summer (DST): UTC-5 (CDT)
- Area codes: 918, 539
- FIPS code: 40/29350
- GNIS feature ID: 1100450

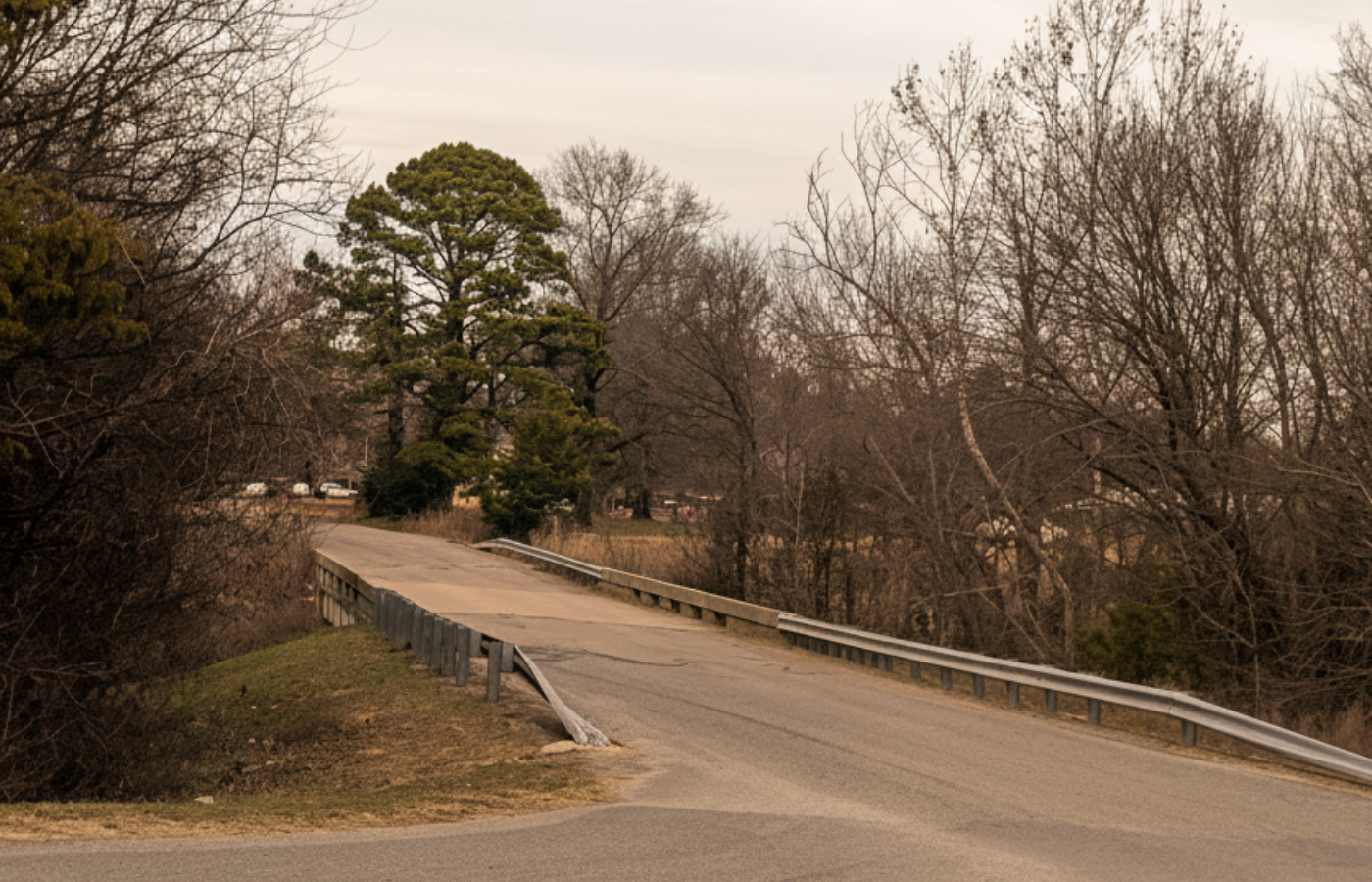
Crossroads of Nail Creek Road and Gilmore Road looking north

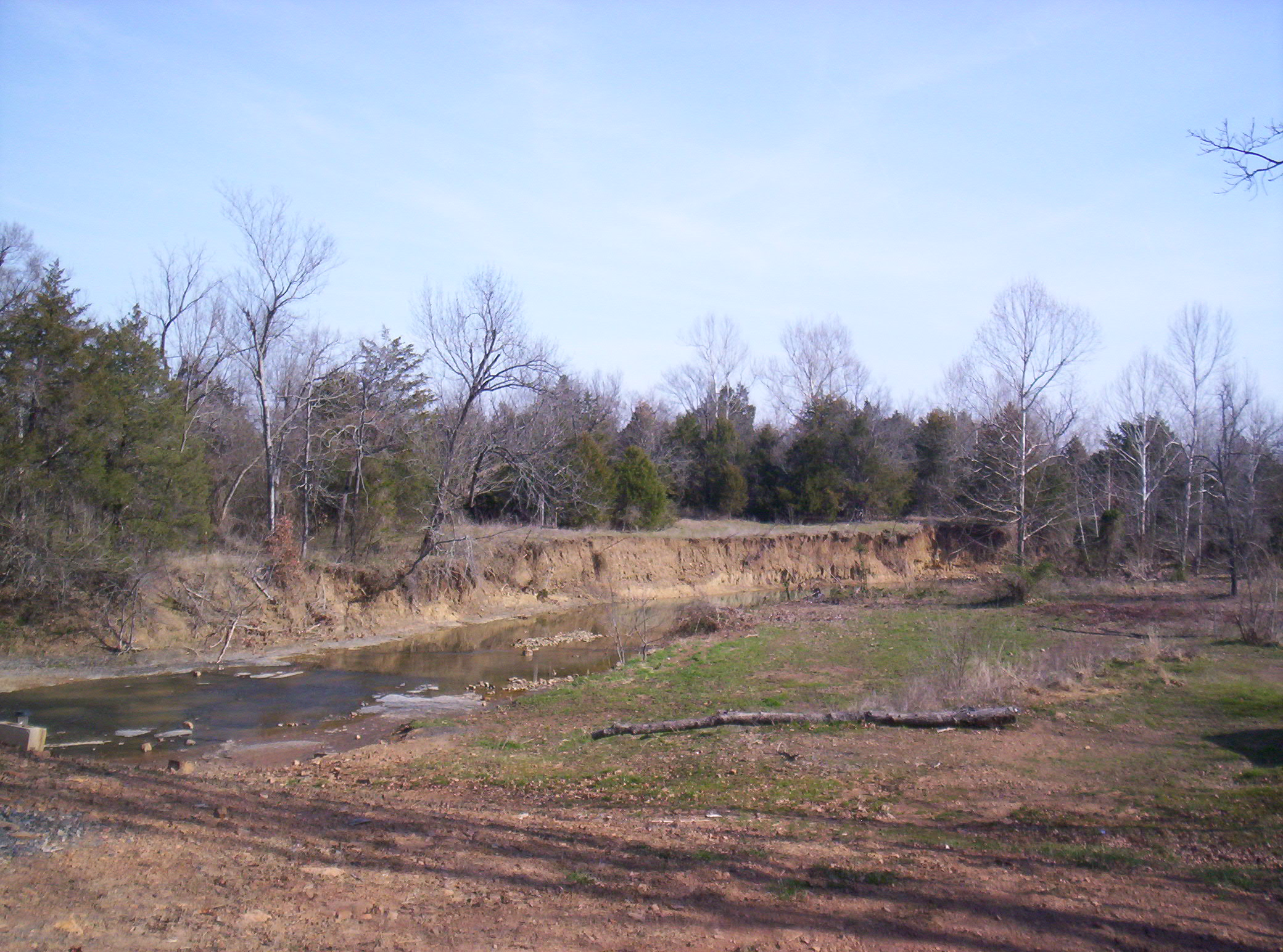
Nail Creek just south of the Gilmore city centre.

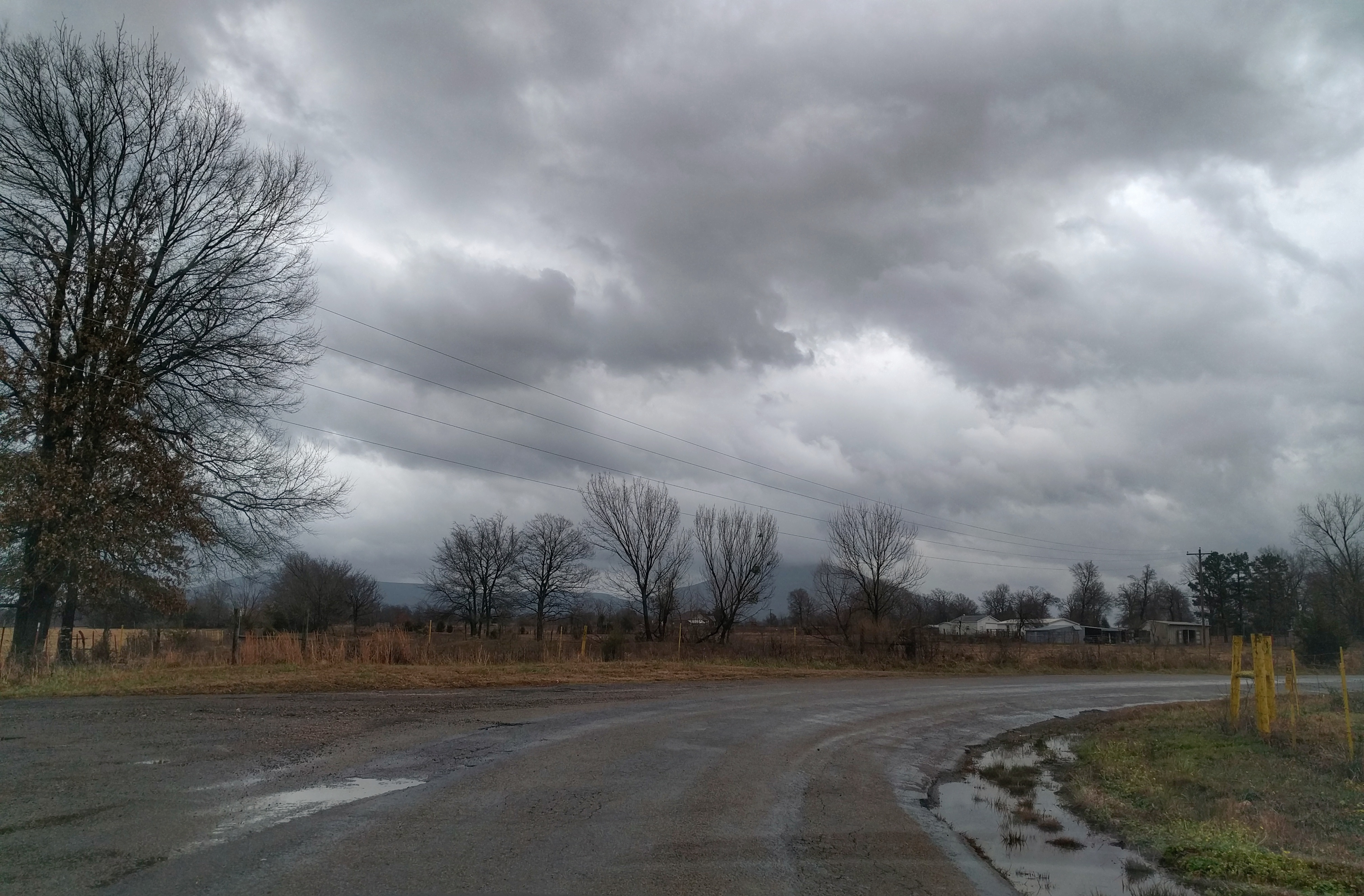
Sugarloaf Mountain with Gilmore, Oklahoma in foreground

Gilmore is an unincorporated community in Le Flore County, Oklahoma, United States. The town, formerly incorporated, boasted a small post office (between 1890 and 1918), city hall, and Mayor Pratt McMillin, a rancher and oil distributor who died in April 2001, aged 84. The primary population of Gilmore lives around the intersection of Nail Creek Road and Gilmore Road just east of Poteau and north of Monroe, although in recent years, multiple houses have been built along Nail Creek Road west of Gilmore Road, expanding the community towards the town of Poteau. The town is home to the Vaughn Memorial Cemetery which was adjacent to the Double Branch Baptist Church until the church burned down in 2004.

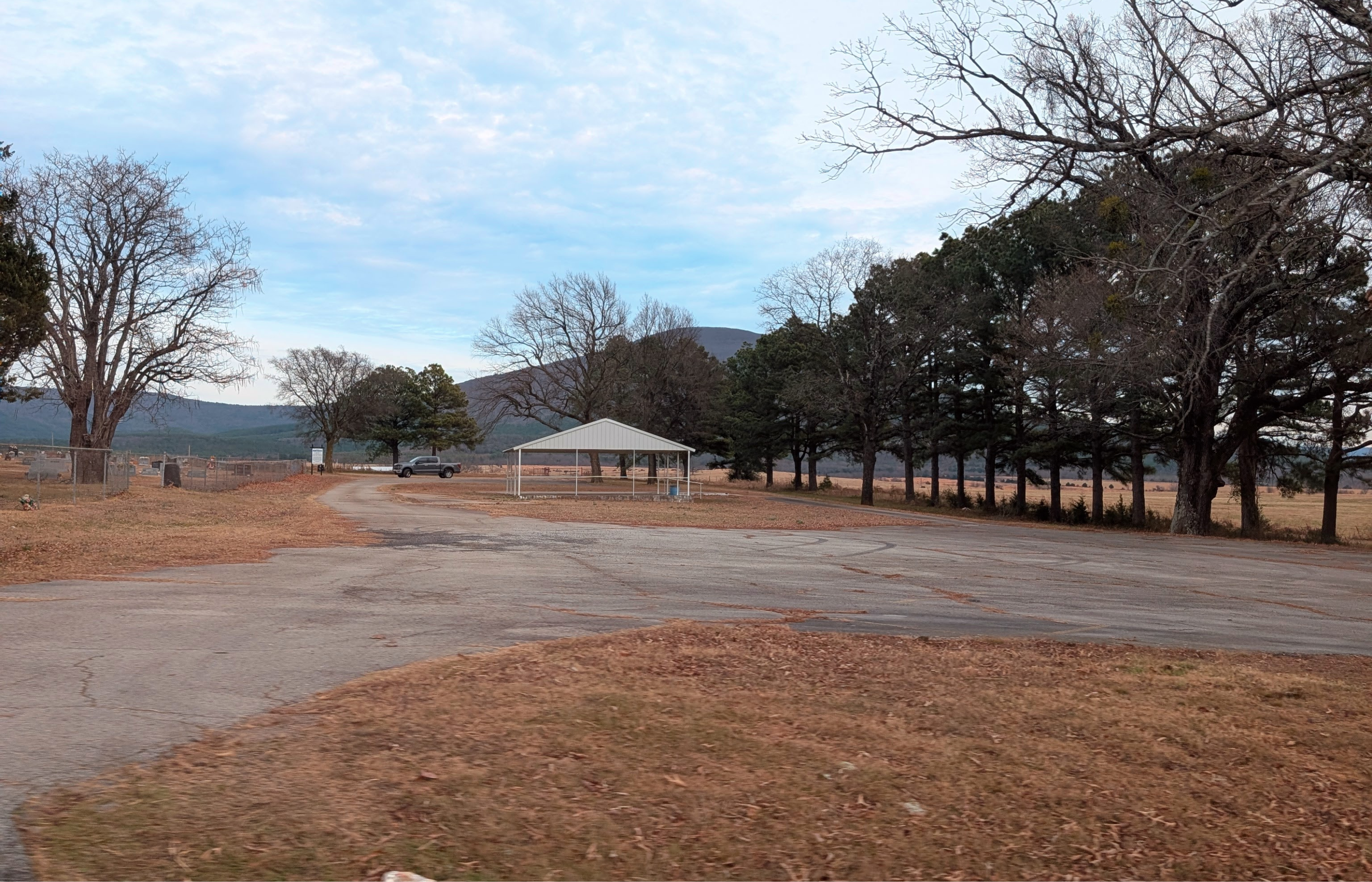
The former site of Double Branch Baptist Church

The surrounding area consists primarily of farmland and forest situated in the Poteau River Valley region between Sugar Loaf Mountain, Oklahoma Peak, and Cavanal Hill with a tributary of the Poteau River, Nail Creek running through Gilmore.

== Location ==
The area of the town was originally located in Sugar Loaf County, Moshulatubbee District of the Choctaw Nation.

Today, the town is located in Choctaw Nation, District 4.

== History ==
A post office opened at Gilmore, Indian Territory, on June 30, 1890. It closed on January 15, 1918. It was named for Rad Gilmore, a local mill operator.

In the 1884 election campaign for sheriff of Sugar Loaf County, Bob Benton and Charles Wilson ran against each other. Benton and Jack Crow shot and killed Wilson outside the county courthouse near Summerfield. Even though Benton shot first, Crow delivered the fatal shot and was the only man to stand trial in the case under Isaac C. Parker. Wilson was buried in Vaughn Cemetery.

On November 22, 1983, an F3 tornado hit the town after traveling 16 miles from Reichert and Howe, ending in the Gilmore area. There were no reported injuries or fatalities.
