= Johnson Prairie, Oklahoma =

Unincorporated community in Oklahoma, US

- Census-designated place
- Location within Oklahoma Location within the United States
- Coordinates: 36°04′45″N 94°58′33″W
- Country: United States
- State: Oklahoma
- County: Cherokee

Area
  - Total: 4.89 sq mi (12.67 km^{2})
  - Land: 4.89 sq mi (12.67 km^{2})
  - Water: 0 sq mi (0.00 km^{2})
- Elevation: 1,125 ft (343 m)

Population (2020)
  - Total: 94
  - Density: 19.2/sq mi (7.42/km^{2})
- Time zone: UTC-6 (Central (CST))
  - Summer (DST): UTC-5 (CDT)
- ZIP Code: 74464 (Tahlequah)
- Area codes: 918/539
- FIPS code: 40-38201
- GNIS feature ID: 2807003

Johnson Prairie is a census-designated place (CDP) in Cherokee County, Oklahoma, United States. It was first listed as a CDP prior to the 2020 census. It includes the unincorporated community of Liberty. As of the 2020 census, Johnson Prairie had a population of 94.

The CDP is in northern Cherokee County, bordered to the north by Teresita, to the east by Lowrey, and to the south by Moodys. It is 12 miles (19 km) north of Tahlequah, the county seat.

== Demographics ==
=== 2020 census ===
As of the 2020 census, Johnson Prairie had a population of 94. The median age was 41.0 years. 23.4% of residents were under the age of 18 and 24.5% of residents were 65 years of age or older. For every 100 females there were 100.0 males, and for every 100 females age 18 and over there were 94.6 males age 18 and over.

0.0% of residents lived in urban areas, while 100.0% lived in rural areas.

There were 39 households in Johnson Prairie, of which 30.8% had children under the age of 18 living in them. Of all households, 66.7% were married-couple households, 7.7% were households with a male householder and no spouse or partner present, and 20.5% were households with a female householder and no spouse or partner present. About 0.0% of all households were made up of individuals and 0.0% had someone living alone who was 65 years of age or older.

There were 42 housing units, of which 7.1% were vacant. The homeowner vacancy rate was 0.0% and the rental vacancy rate was 0.0%.

Racial composition as of the 2020 census
Race	Number	Percent
White	35	37.2%
Black or African American	0	0.0%
American Indian and Alaska Native	45	47.9%
Asian	0	0.0%
Native Hawaiian and Other Pacific Islander	0	0.0%
Some other race	3	3.2%
Two or more races	11	11.7%
Hispanic or Latino (of any race)	0	0.0%
