= Lowrey, Oklahoma =

Unincorporated community in Oklahoma, US

- Census-designated place
- Location within Oklahoma Location within the United States
- Coordinates: 36°05′51″N 94°55′45″W
- Country: United States
- State: Oklahoma
- County: Cherokee

Area
  - Total: 15.85 sq mi (41.04 km^{2})
  - Land: 15.81 sq mi (40.94 km^{2})
  - Water: 0.039 sq mi (0.10 km^{2})
- Elevation: 1,122 ft (342 m)

Population (2020)
  - Total: 286
  - Density: 18.1/sq mi (6.99/km^{2})
- Time zone: UTC-6 (Central (CST))
  - Summer (DST): UTC-5 (CDT)
- ZIP Code: 74464 (Tahlequah)
- Area codes: 918/539
- FIPS code: 40-44275
- GNIS feature ID: 2805338

Lowrey is an unincorporated community and census-designated place (CDP) in Cherokee County, Oklahoma, United States. It was first listed as a CDP prior to the 2020 census. As of the 2020 census, Lowrey had a population of 286.

The CDP is in northern Cherokee County, bordered to the north by Rocky Ford, to the northwest by Teresita, to the southwest by Johnson Prairie, and to the south by Moodys. It is 15 miles (24 km) north of Tahlequah, the county seat.

== Demographics ==
Historical population
Census	Pop.	Note	%±
2020	286		—
U.S. Decennial Census

=== 2020 census ===
As of the 2020 census, Lowrey had a population of 286. The median age was 37.6 years. 24.8% of residents were under the age of 18 and 18.5% of residents were 65 years of age or older. For every 100 females there were 128.8 males, and for every 100 females age 18 and over there were 121.6 males age 18 and over.

0.0% of residents lived in urban areas, while 100.0% lived in rural areas.

There were 108 households in Lowrey, of which 26.9% had children under the age of 18 living in them. Of all households, 69.4% were married-couple households, 9.3% were households with a male householder and no spouse or partner present, and 20.4% were households with a female householder and no spouse or partner present. About 13.9% of all households were made up of individuals and 7.4% had someone living alone who was 65 years of age or older.

There were 120 housing units, of which 10.0% were vacant. The homeowner vacancy rate was 0.0% and the rental vacancy rate was 0.0%.

=== Racial and ethnic composition ===
Racial composition as of the 2020 census
Race	Number	Percent
White	114	39.9%
Black or African American	3	1.0%
American Indian and Alaska Native	122	42.7%
Asian	0	0.0%
Native Hawaiian and Other Pacific Islander	0	0.0%
Some other race	2	0.7%
Two or more races	45	15.7%
Hispanic or Latino (of any race)	5	1.7%
