= Trousdale =

Trousdale may refer to:

== Places in the United States ==
- Trousdale Estates, Beverly Hills, California
- Trousdale, Kansas
- Trousdale, Oklahoma
- Trousdale County, Tennessee
- Trousdale Place, former home of Tennessee governor William Trousdale

== Vessels ==
- USS Trousdale (AKA-79)

== People with the surname ==
- Ann Wagner née Trousdale (born 1962), American politician and diplomat
- Chris Trousdale (1985–2020), American pop singer and actor
- Gary Trousdale (born 1960), American animated movie director
- William Trousdale (1790–1872), governor of Tennessee
- Paul Trousdale (1915–1990), American real estate developer
