= Taylor, Oklahoma =

Taylor, Oklahoma may refer to:

- Taylor, Beckham County, Oklahoma, an unincorporated community
- Taylor, Cotton County, Oklahoma, an unincorporated community
