= Tracey Woodframe Grain Elevator =

- Tracy Woodframe Grain Elevator
- U.S. National Register of Historic Places
- Location within Oklahoma Location within the United States
- Location: N of U.S. 64, Muncey, Oklahoma
- Coordinates: 36°49′15″N 101°45′39″W
- Area: less than one acre
- Built: 1931
- MPS: Woodframe Grain Elevators of Oklahoma Panhandle TR
- NRHP reference No.: 83002137
- Added to NRHP: May 13, 1983

The Tracy Woodframe Grain Elevator was a grain elevator in Muncy, Oklahoma. The elevator was built in 1931 along the Beaver, Mead & Englewood Railroad, the same year Tracy was founded. The elevator operated continuously from its opening until around 1983, outlasting the railroad only a mere 10 years after the last train left eastbound in 1972. On May 13, 1983, the elevator was added to the National Register of Historic Places. The elevator has fallen down. All that remains is a scalehouse that was possibly remnant of a depot for the railroad.
