= Ballou, Oklahoma =

- Census-designated place
- Location within Oklahoma Location within the United States
- Coordinates: 36°08′32″N 95°11′59″W
- Country: United States
- State: Oklahoma
- County: Mayes

Area
  - Total: 3.67 sq mi (9.50 km^{2})
  - Land: 3.67 sq mi (9.50 km^{2})
  - Water: 0 sq mi (0.00 km^{2})
- Elevation: 689 ft (210 m)

Population (2020)
  - Total: 155
  - Density: 42.2/sq mi (16.31/km^{2})
- Time zone: UTC-6 (Central (CST))
  - Summer (DST): UTC-5 (CST)
- ZIP Code: 74352 (Locust Grove)
- FIPS code: 40-04075
- GNIS feature ID: 2407794

Ballou is a census-designated place (CDP) in Mayes County, Oklahoma, United States. As of the 2020 census, the population was 155, down from 176 in 2010.

== Geography ==
Ballou is in southeastern Mayes County. It is bordered to the west by Murphy and to the south by Cedar Crest. Locust Grove, the nearest incorporated town, is less than 5 miles (8 km) to the north-northeast.

According to the U.S. Census Bureau, the Ballou CDP has a total area of 3.7 square miles (9.6 km^{2}), all land.

== Demographics ==
Historical population
Census	Pop.	Note	%±
2000	142		—
2010	176		23.9%
2020	155		−11.9%
U.S. Decennial Census

=== 2020 census ===
As of the 2020 census, Ballou had a population of 155. The median age was 41.3 years. 14.2% of residents were under the age of 18 and 11.6% of residents were 65 years of age or older. For every 100 females there were 70.3 males, and for every 100 females age 18 and over there were 66.2 males age 18 and over.

0.0% of residents lived in urban areas, while 100.0% lived in rural areas.

There were 60 households in Ballou, of which 41.7% had children under the age of 18 living in them. Of all households, 65.0% were married-couple households, 15.0% were households with a male householder and no spouse or partner present, and 11.7% were households with a female householder and no spouse or partner present. About 16.6% of all households were made up of individuals and 10.0% had someone living alone who was 65 years of age or older.

There were 67 housing units, of which 10.4% were vacant. The homeowner vacancy rate was 0.0% and the rental vacancy rate was 0.0%.

Racial composition as of the 2020 census
Race	Number	Percent
White	103	66.5%
Black or African American	0	0.0%
American Indian and Alaska Native	21	13.5%
Asian	0	0.0%
Native Hawaiian and Other Pacific Islander	0	0.0%
Some other race	0	0.0%
Two or more races	31	20.0%
Hispanic or Latino (of any race)	11	7.1%

=== 2000 census ===
As of the census of 2000, there were 142 people, 58 households, and 41 families residing in the CDP. The population density was 38.0 inhabitants per square mile (14.7/km^{2}). There were 60 housing units at an average density of 16.1/sq mi (6.2/km^{2}). The racial makeup of the CDP was 73.94% White, 19.01% Native American, and 7.04% from two or more races.

Of the 58 households, 19.0% had children under the age of 18 living with them, 62.1% were married couples living together, 5.2% had a female householder with no husband present, and 27.6% were non-families. 24.1% of all households were made up of individuals, and 8.6% had someone living alone who was 65 years of age or older. The average household size was 2.45 individuals and the average family size was 2.93.

In the CDP, the population was spread out, with 18.3% under the age of 18, 10.6% from 18 to 24, 31.0% from 25 to 44, 28.2% from 45 to 64, and 12.0% who were 65 years of age or older. The median age was 40 years. For every 100 females, there were 140.7 males. For every 100 females age 18 and over, there were 118.9 males.

The median income for a household in the CDP was $27,321, and the median income for a family was $53,068. Males had a median income of $23,750 versus $50,455 for females. The per capita income for the CDP was $15,859. None of the population and none of the families were below the poverty line.

== Education ==
It is in the Locust Grove Public Schools school district.
