= Corum, Oklahoma =

Unincorporated community in Oklahoma, US

- Unincorporated community
- Location within Oklahoma Corum (the United States)
- Coordinates: 34°21′44″N 98°06′15″W
- Country: United States
- State: Oklahoma
- County: Stephens
- Elevation: 1,020 ft (310 m)

Corum is an unincorporated community in Stephens County, Oklahoma, United States. The community is recorded as a populated place by the Geographic Names Information System (GNIS) and sits at an elevation of approximately 1,020 feet (311 m).

== History ==
Corum developed as a small rural settlement in the early twentieth century amid agricultural growth across southern Oklahoma. A local post office was established in 1902 and remained in operation until 1904, marking one of the earliest formal references to the community during the final years of Oklahoma Territory before statehood.

Historic county maps and early USGS topographic sheets show Corum located along what would later become the corridor of Oklahoma State Highway 53, positioned between Comanche and Duncan.

== Demographics ==
Corum is not a census-designated place, and therefore it does not have separately published population statistics. Demographic data for the area are included within the larger datasets for Stephens County produced by the United States Census Bureau.

== See also ==
- Stephens County, Oklahoma
- List of unincorporated communities in Oklahoma
