= Rocky Ford, Oklahoma =

Unincorporated community in Oklahoma, US

Rocky Ford, Oklahoma ᏥᏍᏛᏃᏱ (Cherokee)
- Census-designated place
- Location within Oklahoma Location within the United States
- Coordinates: 36°09′21″N 94°54′40″W
- Country: United States
- State: Oklahoma
- Counties: Delaware; Cherokee

Area
  - Total: 6.93 sq mi (17.94 km^{2})
  - Land: 6.93 sq mi (17.94 km^{2})
  - Water: 0 sq mi (0.00 km^{2})
- Elevation: 1,011 ft (308 m)

Population (2020)
  - Total: 283
  - Density: 40.9/sq mi (15.78/km^{2})
- Time zone: UTC-6 (Central (CST))
  - Summer (DST): UTC-5 (CDT)
- FIPS code: 40-63715
- GNIS feature ID: 2409198

Rocky Ford (Cherokee: ᏥᏍᏛᏃᏱ) is a census-designated place (CDP) in Delaware and Cherokee counties, Oklahoma, United States. The population was 283 as of the 2020 Census, a 464% increase over the population of 61 reported at the 2010 census.

== Geography ==
Rocky Ford is located in southwestern Delaware County and northern Cherokee County. It is bordered to the north and east by Leach and to the southwest by Lowrey. Rocky Ford is 9 miles (14 km) south and west of the town of Kansas.

According to the United States Census Bureau, the Rocky Ford CDP has a total area of 6.9 square miles (17.9 km^{2}), all land.

== Demographics ==
Historical population
Census	Pop.	Note	%±
2000	60		—
2010	61		1.7%
2020	283		363.9%
U.S. Decennial Census

=== 2020 census ===
As of the 2020 census, Rocky Ford had a population of 283. The median age was 32.9 years. 28.6% of residents were under the age of 18 and 13.4% of residents were 65 years of age or older. For every 100 females there were 102.1 males, and for every 100 females age 18 and over there were 98.0 males age 18 and over.

0.0% of residents lived in urban areas, while 100.0% lived in rural areas.

There were 91 households in Rocky Ford, of which 41.8% had children under the age of 18 living in them. Of all households, 58.2% were married-couple households, 11.0% were households with a male householder and no spouse or partner present, and 27.5% were households with a female householder and no spouse or partner present. About 27.5% of all households were made up of individuals and 20.9% had someone living alone who was 65 years of age or older.

There were 108 housing units, of which 15.7% were vacant. The homeowner vacancy rate was 1.8% and the rental vacancy rate was 9.8%.

Racial composition as of the 2020 census
Race	Number	Percent
White	87	30.7%
Black or African American	0	0.0%
American Indian and Alaska Native	158	55.8%
Asian	6	2.1%
Native Hawaiian and Other Pacific Islander	0	0.0%
Some other race	0	0.0%
Two or more races	32	11.3%
Hispanic or Latino (of any race)	8	2.8%

=== 2000 census ===
As of the census of 2000, there were 60 people, 18 households, and 16 families residing in the CDP. The population density was 25.0 people per square mile (9.7/km^{2}). There were 21 housing units at an average density of 8.7/sq mi (3.4/km^{2}). The racial makeup of the CDP was 45.00% White, 46.67% Native American, and 8.33% from two or more races.

There were 18 households, out of which 61.1% had children under the age of 18 living with them, 77.8% were married couples living together, and 11.1% were non-families. 11.1% of all households were made up of individuals, and none had someone living alone who was 65 years of age or older. The average household size was 3.33 and the average family size was 3.63.

In the CDP, the population was spread out, with 41.7% under the age of 18, 8.3% from 18 to 24, 30.0% from 25 to 44, 16.7% from 45 to 64, and 3.3% who were 65 years of age or older. The median age was 26 years. For every 100 females, there were 130.8 males. For every 100 females age 18 and over, there were 118.8 males.

The median income for a household in the CDP was $31,875, and the median income for a family was $31,250. Males had a median income of $25,000 versus $40,833 for females. The per capita income for the CDP was $17,477. There were no families and 5.7% of the population living below the poverty line, including none under 18 and none of those over 64.

== Education ==
The portion in Cherokee County is in the Oaks-Mission Public Schools school district.

The portion in Delaware County is in the Leach Public School school district.
