= Copeland, Oklahoma =

Copeland, Oklahoma may refer to:

- Copeland, a post office established in Atoka County
- Copeland, a census-designated place in Delaware County, Oklahoma
