= Mule Barn, Oklahoma =

- Unincorporated community
- Location of Mule Barn in Pawnee County
- Coordinates: 36°13′04″N 96°18′44″W
- Country: United States
- State: Oklahoma
- County: Pawnee
- Incorporated: 1985
- Dissolved: 2008

Area
  - Total: 0.033 sq mi (0.085 km^{2})
  - Land: 0.033 sq mi (0.085 km^{2})
  - Water: 0 sq mi (0.000 km^{2})
- Elevation: 850 ft (260 m)

Population (2000)
  - Total: 0
  - Density: 0/sq mi (0/km^{2})
- Time zone: UTC−6 (Central (CST))
  - Summer (DST): UTC−5 (CDT)
- FIPS code: 40-49860
- GNIS feature ID: 2413027

Mule Barn was a town in Pawnee County, Oklahoma, United States, located on the west side of Keystone Lake west-northwest of Tulsa. Its population was recorded as zero in both the 1990 and 2000 enumerations.

== History ==
Construction of Keystone Dam in the 1960s encouraged scattered settlement on the Keystone Lake peninsula. In 1976–1977, residents in southeastern Pawnee County pursued incorporation of numerous micro‑communities to prevent annexation by nearby Westport. Mule Barn ultimately held corporate status from 1985 until its dissolution in 2008, one of only two such Keystone‑area micro‑towns (along with Oak Grove) to remain incorporated for more than a brief period.

Under Oklahoma law, a town may be involuntarily dissolved when it ceases to function—such as when general municipal elections are not called for two successive cycles or when officials fail to qualify for two successive elections. The U.S. Census Bureau’s geographic change notes document selected legal boundary changes, including deletions of incorporated places during the 2000–2010 period; Mule Barn was deleted (dissolved) in 2008.

== Geography ==
According to Census 2000 gazetteer measurements, Mule Barn had a total area of 0.033 square miles (0.09 km^{2}), all land, with representative coordinates at 36.2173°N 96.3117°W. The Geographic Names Information System (GNIS) lists Mule Barn (feature class: civil) with a feature ID of 2413027 and an elevation of approximately 850 feet (259.1 m).

== Demographics ==
Census tallies recorded a population of 0 in 1990 and 2000; the 2000 count also reported one housing unit within the corporate limits. Subsequent tabulations and estimates treat Mule Barn as a deleted / former incorporated place.

== Government and dissolution ==
Mule Barn’s municipal government ceased to function, and pursuant to Title 11, §11‑7‑105, the town was dissolved in 2008. The change appears in the Census Bureau’s boundary change notes for incorporated places during the 2000-2010 period.

== See also ==
- Oak Grove, Oklahoma
- Keystone Lake
- Westport, Oklahoma
