= Sugar Loaf County, Choctaw Nation =

Political subdivision of Choctaw Nation

Coordinates: 34.94°N 94.661°W

Sugar Loaf County was a political subdivision of the Choctaw Nation of Indian Territory, prior to Oklahoma being admitted as a state. The county formed part of the Nation's Moshulatubbee District, or First District, one of three administrative super-regions.

== History ==
The county was also called Nvnih Chufvk Kaunti. The Choctaw word nvnih means “a mountain or high hill” and chufvk means “a pointed object.” (The apparent lower-case letter “v” is the Greek letter upsilon, which makes a short “u” sound, for a pronunciation akin to “nunih chufuk.”) This description referred to Sugar Loaf Mountain, which anchored the county's eastern border with Arkansas southeast of Poteau, east of the community of Gilmore. Sugar Loaf Mountain, whose summit is very conical, is locally prominent, rising from the valley floor to an elevation of 2,560 feet.

Sugar Loaf County was one of the original 19 counties created by the General Council of the Choctaw Nation in 1850. The county's boundaries were established and designated according to easily recognizable natural landmarks, as were the boundaries of all Choctaw Nation counties. The county was bordered on the south by the Winding Stair Mountains. The county's northern border threaded its way through well-defined valleys along Cavanal Mountain and adjacent ridges, following Cedar Creek, Fourche Maline, and the Poteau River. Its eastern border was with Arkansas, and its western border was formed by a line from the source of Gaines Creek north to the headwaters of Bayouzeal. It then followed the Bayouzeal to the Skullyville County boundary line. (Bayouzeal is not a stream name currently in use, and the exact identity of the stream in question is unknown. Maps from the 1800s suggest it may be Brushy Creek or Brazil Creek.)

The county courthouse at statehood was located at Conser, a settlement which is no longer extant. It was located southwest of present-day Heavener, west of Hodgen, and southeast of Wister Lake.

The county served as an election district for members of the National Council, and as a unit of local administration. Constitutional officers, all of whom served for two-year terms and were elected by the voters, included the county judge, sheriff, and a ranger. The judge's duties included oversight of overall county administration. The sheriff collected taxes, monitored unlawful intrusion by intruders (usually white Americans from the United States), and conducted the census. The county ranger advertised and sold strayed livestock.

== Statehood ==
As Oklahoma's statehood approached, its leading citizens, who were gathered for the Oklahoma Constitutional Convention, realized in laying out the future state's counties that, while logically designed, the Choctaw Nation's counties could not exist as economically viable political subdivisions. In most the county seat existed generally for holding county court and not as a population center. This was certainly true of sparsely populated Sugar Loaf County.

This conundrum was also recognized by the framers of the proposed State of Sequoyah, who met in 1905 to propose statehood for the Indian Territory. The Sequoyah Constitutional Convention also proposed a county structure that abolished the Choctaw counties. Sugar Loaf County was divided principally into the proposed Wade County and Rutherford County. Poteau would have been Rutherford County's principal town. Talihina and Heavener would have been the largest towns in Wade County.

Almost none of this proposition was borrowed two years later by Oklahoma's framers, who adopted a very different county structure for the region. The territory formerly comprising Sugar Loaf County, Choctaw Nation now falls within Le Flore County, Oklahoma. Sugar Loaf County ceased to exist upon Oklahoma's statehood on November 16, 1907.
