= Four Corners, Oklahoma =

Four Corners, Oklahoma may refer to unincorporated settlements in several counties in the U.S. state of Oklahoma:

- Four Corners, Lincoln County, Oklahoma
- Four Corners, Texas County, Oklahoma
