= Natura, Oklahoma =

Coordinates: 35°44′24″N 95°56′08″W

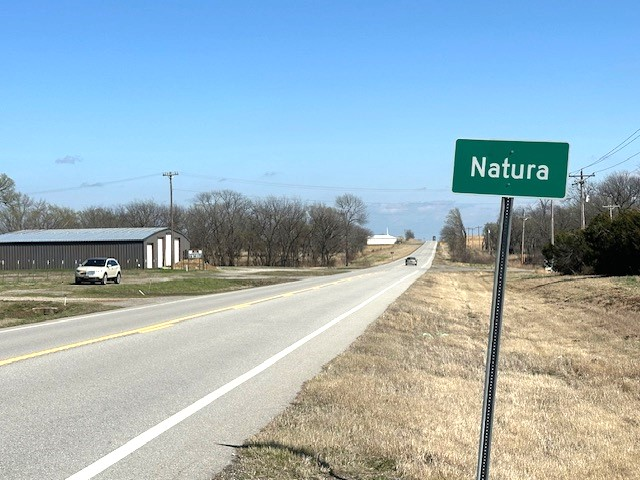
Entry into Natura from the west, 3-2026

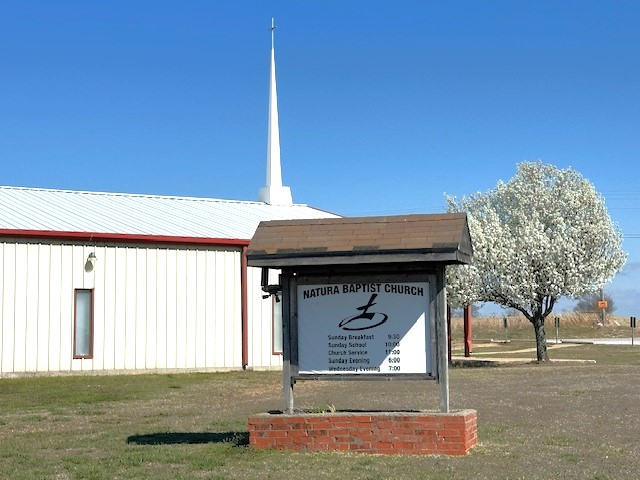
Natura Baptist Church in March of 2026

Natura is a populated place in Okmulgee County, Oklahoma. It is located about 10 miles north of the City of Okmulgee off State Highway 16, east of both the town of Beggs and US-75.

The post office was established in 1905, but only remained open until 1910. While now primarily residential, the area was the location of the now-closed Natura Winery, and is still the location of the Natura Baptist Church.
