= Loving, Oklahoma =

Unincorporated community in Oklahoma, US

Coordinates: 34°52′01″N 94°28′48″W

Loving is an unincorporated community in Le Flore County, Oklahoma, United States.

== History ==
A post office was established at Loving, Oklahoma on December 2, 1908. It closed on June 15, 1922.

Loving was named after John and Amanda Loving. John and Amanda Loving were Choctaw. John was a translator for the Choctaw because he spoke English as well as Choctaw, the Muskogean language.
