= Cavanal Hill =

Hill in Oklahoma, United States

Cavanal Mountain
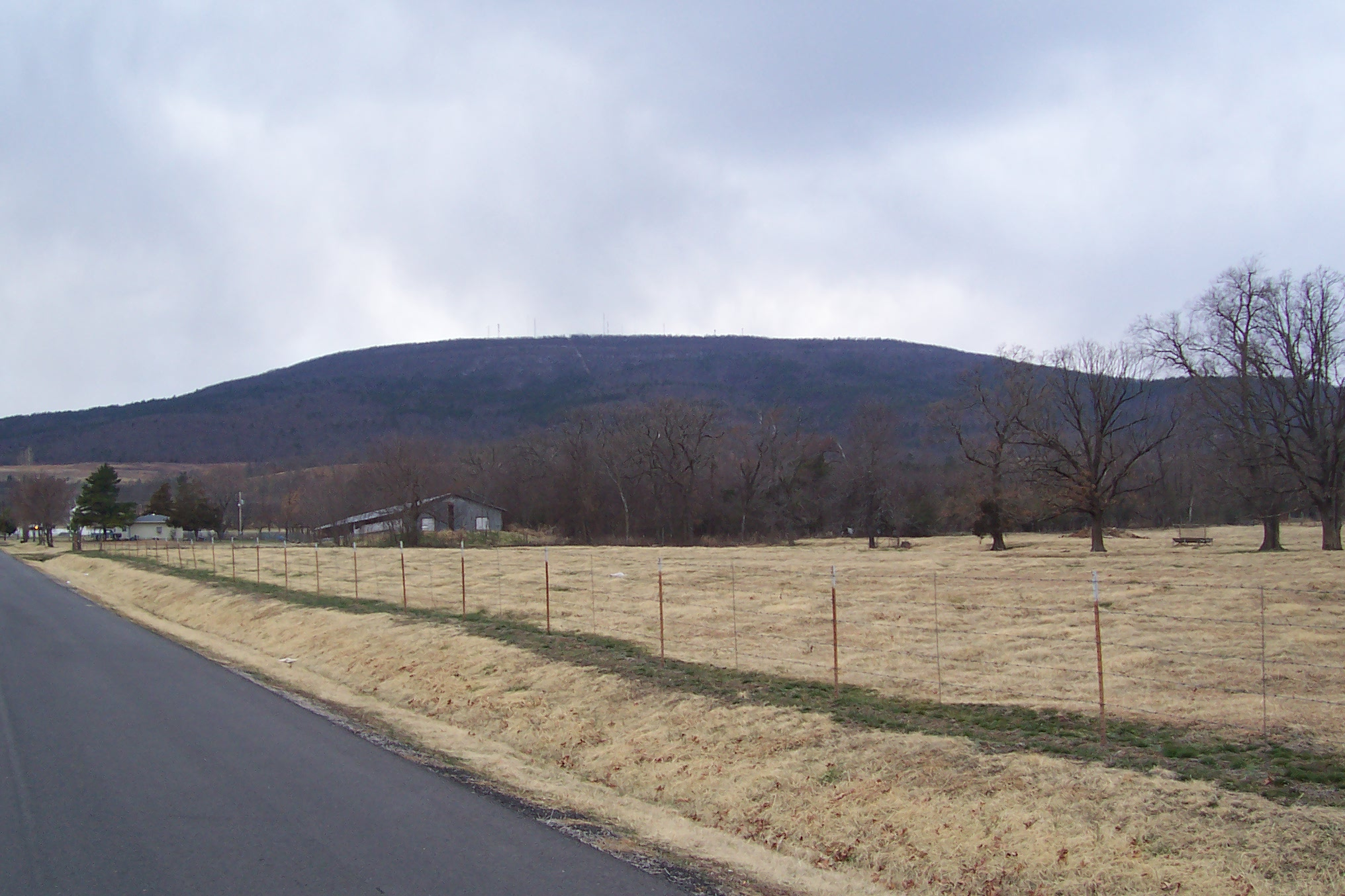
- Cavanal Hill viewed from the southeast side

Highest point
- Elevation: 2,385 ft (727 m)
- Prominence: 1,775 ft (541 m)
- Coordinates: 35°04′15″N 94°40′46″W

Naming
- Etymology: French caverneux ("cavernous")

Geography
- Location within Oklahoma
- Location: Le Flore County, Oklahoma, U.S.
- Parent range: Ouachita Mountains
- Topo map: USGS Cavanal Mountain

Cavanal Hill (officially Cavanal Mountain), located near Poteau, Oklahoma, is described by a sign at its base as the "'World's Highest Hill' – Elevation: 1,999 feet". The actual summit elevation is 2,385 feet (727 m) above sea level; the difference in elevation between the summit and the Poteau River 3 miles (5 km) to the north is 1,960 feet (600 m).

== Hill / Mountain ==
The billing is based on a delineation between a hill and a mountain, a mountain being a geographical feature were 2,000 feet or higher than its base, although other sources use 1,000 feet as the cutoff. There are other summits, including in the United States, that use the name hill, but have more than 2,000 feet of topographic prominence. Additionally, the official name of this summit uses the term "mountain" and not "hill".

== Etymology ==
One source claims that the name is derived from a French word meaning "cave": caverne. Oklahoma historian Muriel H. Wright wrote that cavanol is a corruption of the French word caverneux, meaning "cavernous."

== History ==
Cavanal Hill was a notable landmark for French explorers who traveled this area in the 18th century and gave the landmark its name. During the late 1700s, French fur trappers established a camp at the base of Cavanal and named it Poteau, for "Post". Thomas Nuttall studied plant life here in 1819, and learned about other natural wonders from local French trappers and Indians who were living here.

During territorial times Cavanal Hill was along the border of Skullyville County and Sugar Loaf County, two of the constituent counties making up the Moshulatubbee District of the Choctaw Nation.

In the late 1800s, Walter Beard established a health resort at the summit of Cavanal Hill. This was a modest wood-frame structure that catered to visitors in the area. Besides the view, the major draw was the natural springs that occur throughout the region.

Halfway up Cavanal Hill, George Witte established the town of Witteville. This was a coal mining company town. The mines were located three miles east of the town. Witteville is still marked on some maps, and can be found at the "Y" leading up to the top of Cavanal Hill. Much of the road leading up to the top of the hill was part of the original railroad that led to Witteville.

In the 1960s, Senator Robert S. Kerr established a summer residence at the foot of Cavanal Hill. This summer house was located on the same site where Walter Beard first established his health resort.

== Recreation ==
Cavanal Hill is now the site of mountain bike races and the Cavanal Hill Killer 5-Mile Walk. A 4.5 miles (7.2 km) blacktopped road leads to the summit where visitors can enjoy picturesque views of the Poteau River Valley. Reportedly, one can see Mount Magazine in Arkansas from here on a clear day.
