= Sedan, Oklahoma =

- Unincorporated community
- Location within Oklahoma and the United States Sedan (the United States)
- Coordinates: 34°58′18″N 98°45′39″W
- Country: United States
- State: Oklahoma
- County: Kiowa
- Elevation: 1,460 ft (450 m)
- Time zone: UTC-6 (Central (CST))
  - Summer (DST): UTC-5 (CDT)
- GNIS feature ID: 1100823

Sedan is an unincorporated community in Kiowa County, Oklahoma, United States. A post office operated in Sedan from 1902 to 1935. The community was named after Sedan, Kansas.
