= Chloeta, Oklahoma =

Community in Oklahoma, US

Coordinates: 36°25′23″N 94°58′15″W

Chloeta (or Topsy) is a community located on State Highway 20 in Delaware County, Oklahoma, United States, north of Spavinaw Lake. The post office existed from April 18, 1898, until January 31, 1914.
