= Sweethome, Oklahoma =

Unincorporated community in Oklahoma, US

Coordinates: 35°42′59″N 96°59′57″W

Sweethome was a small rural community in Lincoln County, Oklahoma. The community was named for a similar community in Texas by the same name where many of the settlers lived before making the Run of '91. The Sweethome Baptist Church is the oldest church in the district. When segregation became law after statehood in 1907, the Sweethome school had the distinction of being the only school district in Lincoln County having the majority school be the colored school. They reserved one position on the school board for whites to represent the minority school in the district.
