= Salt Fork, Oklahoma =

- Unincorporated community
- Location within Oklahoma Location within the United States
- Coordinates: 36°38′06″N 97°35′20″W
- Country: United States
- State: Oklahoma
- County: Grant
- Elevation: 1,007 ft (307 m)
- Time zone: UTC-6 (Central (CST))
  - Summer (DST): UTC-5 (CDT)
- Area code: 580
- GNIS feature ID: 1097703

Salt Fork is an unincorporated community in southeast Grant County, Oklahoma, United States. The community is on Oklahoma State Highway 74 approximately six miles south of Lamont and one mile south of the Salt Fork Arkansas River.

== History ==
The community was originally called Elmpark, but it was renamed after the nearby Salt Fork Arkansas River.

The community's post office was officially established on July 12, 1895, and it operated until April 30, 1951.
