= Crutcho, Oklahoma =

Crutcho
- Unincorporated community
- Location within the state of Oklahoma Crutcho (the United States)
- Coordinates: 35°29′23″N 97°24′36″W
- Country: United States
- State: Oklahoma
- County: Oklahoma
- Time zone: UTC-6 (Central (CST))
  - Summer (DST): UTC-5 (CDT)

Crutcho is an unincorporated community in Oklahoma County, Oklahoma, United States, on the outskirts of Oklahoma City. It is located near the intersection of US Highway 62 (Northeast 23rd Street) and Air Depot Boulevard. It took its name from Crutcho Creek, which flows through the community. The creek, in turn, took its name from the Crutch-O Ranch which operated in the area prior to opening of Old Oklahoma for settlement.

== Sources ==
- Peery, Dan W. "The First Two Years". Chronicles of Oklahoma. 7:4 (December 1929) 419–457. (accessed February 6, 2007)
