= Dighton, Oklahoma =

Coordinates: 35°28′03″N 95°53′35″W

Dighton is a populated place in Okmulgee County, Oklahoma. It is about 7 miles east-northeast of Henryetta, Oklahoma, and is located south of US Route 266 on Bartlett Road.

Originally known as Bartlett, the town appears as Dighton on a 1911 Rand-McNally map of the county. It had a post office starting in 1913, but ending in 1949. (This is not to be confused with the Bartlett neighborhood in Oklahoma City.)
