= Eddy, Oklahoma =

- Unincorporated community
- Location within Oklahoma Location within the United States
- Coordinates: 36°43′54″N 97°27′31″W
- Country: United States
- State: Oklahoma
- County: Kay
- Elevation: 1,066 ft (325 m)
- Time zone: UTC-6 (Central (CST))
  - Summer (DST): UTC-5 (CDT)
- GNIS feature ID

Eddy is an unincorporated community in Kay County, Oklahoma, United States. It is seven miles southwest of Blackwell. The community was originally called Osborne, but its name was changed to Eddy on January 3, 1901. It was named "Eddy" after Ed E. Peckham, who was the son of railroad developer E.L. Peckham, whose name gave Peckham its name. A post office operated in Eddy but closed on February 22, 1957.
