= Zoe, Oklahoma =

Unincorporated community in Oklahoma, US

Coordinates: 34°46′04″N 94°37′42″W

Zoe is an unincorporated community in eastern Le Flore County, Oklahoma, United States.

The community is on a county road just east of combined US routes 59-270. Heavener is approximately eight miles to the north. The Black Fork of the Poteau River flows past the north side of the community.
