= Gulftown, Oklahoma =

Coordinates: 35°27′23″N 95°54′40″W

Gulftown is an unincorporated community in Okmulgee County, Oklahoma, at an elevation of 610 feet high. It is located about two miles east of Dewar, Oklahoma. It is centered around the corner of Hackberry Road and Arbeka Road, being both south and east of US Route 266.

The cultural feature (locale) in Okmulgee County known as Four Corners is just south of Gulftown on Arbeka Road (a/k/a N3990 Road), at the intersection with Holly Road (a/k/a E0185 Road).
