= Conser, Oklahoma =

Unincorporated community in Oklahoma, US

Location of Conser within the state of Oklahoma

Conser is an unincorporated community in Le Flore County, Oklahoma, United States.

== History ==
A post office was established at Conser, Indian Territory on July 7, 1894; it closed on July 15, 1919. The post office was named for Jane Conser, its first postmaster.

Prior to Oklahoma's statehood, Conser was located in Sugar Loaf County, one of the counties making up the Moshulatubbee District of the Choctaw Nation in the Indian Territory. The county courthouse for Sugar Loaf County was at Conser.
