= Murphy, Oklahoma =

- Census-designated place
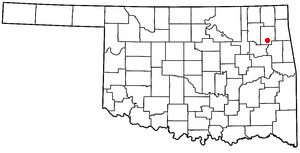
- Location in Oklahoma
- Coordinates: 36°7′50″N 95°14′51″W
- Country: United States
- State: Oklahoma
- County: Mayes

Area
  - Total: 4.12 sq mi (10.68 km^{2})
  - Land: 4.12 sq mi (10.68 km^{2})
  - Water: 0 sq mi (0.00 km^{2})
- Elevation: 794 ft (242 m)

Population (2020)
  - Total: 140
  - Density: 34.0/sq mi (13.11/km^{2})
- Time zone: UTC-6 (Central (CST))
  - Summer (DST): UTC-5 (CDT)
- ZIP Code: 74352 (Locust Grove)
- FIPS code: 40-49950
- GNIS feature ID: 2408891

Murphy is an unincorporated community and census-designated place (CDP) in Mayes County, Oklahoma, United States. The population was 140 at the 2020 census, down from 219 in 2010.

== Geography ==
Murphy is in southern Mayes County, bordered to the east by Ballou and Cedar Crest, and to the southwest by Fort Gibson Lake on the Neosho River. It is 7 miles (11 km) southwest of Locust Grove, the town whose post office serves Murphy.

According to the U.S. Census Bureau, the Murphy CDP has a total area of 4.3 square miles (11 km^{2}), all land.

== Demographics ==
Historical population
Census	Pop.	Note	%±
2000	231		—
2010	219		−5.2%
2020	140		−36.1%
U.S. Decennial Census

=== 2020 census ===
As of the 2020 census, Murphy had a population of 140. The median age was 38.0 years. 22.1% of residents were under the age of 18 and 25.0% of residents were 65 years of age or older. For every 100 females there were 125.8 males, and for every 100 females age 18 and over there were 113.7 males age 18 and over.

0.0% of residents lived in urban areas, while 100.0% lived in rural areas.

There were 62 households in Murphy, of which 19.4% had children under the age of 18 living in them. Of all households, 62.9% were married-couple households, 12.9% were households with a male householder and no spouse or partner present, and 16.1% were households with a female householder and no spouse or partner present. About 25.8% of all households were made up of individuals and 6.5% had someone living alone who was 65 years of age or older.

There were 88 housing units, of which 29.5% were vacant. The homeowner vacancy rate was 0.0% and the rental vacancy rate was 100.0%.

Racial composition as of the 2020 census
Race	Number	Percent
White	77	55.0%
Black or African American	1	0.7%
American Indian and Alaska Native	39	27.9%
Asian	2	1.4%
Native Hawaiian and Other Pacific Islander	0	0.0%
Some other race	1	0.7%
Two or more races	20	14.3%
Hispanic or Latino (of any race)	2	1.4%

=== 2000 census ===
As of the census of 2000, there were 231 people, 89 households, and 62 families residing in the CDP. The population density was 53.4 inhabitants per square mile (20.6/km^{2}). There were 110 housing units at an average density of 25.4/sq mi (9.8/km^{2}). The racial makeup of the CDP was 66.23% White, 26.41% Native American, and 7.36% from two or more races. Hispanic or Latino of any race were 0.87% of the population.

There were 89 households, out of which 29.2% had children under the age of 18 living with them, 58.4% were married couples living together, 7.9% had a female householder with no husband present, and 30.3% were non-families. 22.5% of all households were made up of individuals, and 10.1% had someone living alone who was 65 years of age or older. The average household size was 2.60 and the average family size was 3.10.

In the CDP, the population was spread out, with 29.0% under the age of 18, 4.3% from 18 to 24, 28.1% from 25 to 44, 25.1% from 45 to 64, and 13.4% who were 65 years of age or older. The median age was 39 years. For every 100 females, there were 99.1 males. For every 100 females age 18 and over, there were 100.0 males.

The median income for a household in the CDP was $17,330, and the median income for a family was $35,227. Males had a median income of $29,125 versus $12,500 for females. The per capita income for the CDP was $10,472. About 13.5% of families and 22.2% of the population were below the poverty line, including 22.7% of those under the age of eighteen and 26.7% of those 65 or over.

== Education ==
It is in the Locust Grove Public Schools school district.
