= Cedar Crest, Oklahoma =

- Census-designated place
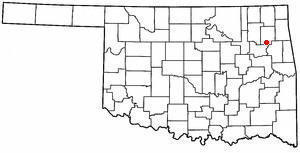
- Location in Oklahoma
- Coordinates: 36°07′24″N 95°10′23″W
- Country: United States
- State: Oklahoma
- County: Mayes

Area
  - Total: 7.28 sq mi (18.86 km^{2})
  - Land: 7.28 sq mi (18.86 km^{2})
  - Water: 0 sq mi (0.00 km^{2})
- Elevation: 794 ft (242 m)

Population (2020)
  - Total: 276
  - Density: 37.9/sq mi (14.63/km^{2})
- Time zone: UTC-6 (Central (CST))
  - Summer (DST): UTC-5 (CDT)
- ZIP Code: 74352 (Locust Grove)
- FIPS code: 40-12930
- GNIS feature ID: 2407998

Cedar Crest is a census-designated place (CDP) in Mayes County, Oklahoma, United States. The population was 276 at the 2020 census, down from 312 in 2010.

== Geography ==
Cedar Crest is in southeastern Mayes County. It is bordered to the northwest by Ballou, to the west by Murphy, and to the northeast by Oklahoma State Highway 82, which leads north 5 miles (8 km) to Locust Grove and southeast 21 miles (34 km) to Tahlequah.

According to the U.S. Census Bureau, the Cedar Crest CDP has a total area of 7.3 square miles (18.9 km^{2}), all of it recorded as land. Spring Creek flows through the west side of the CDP, becoming an arm of Fort Gibson Lake at the westernmost point of the community. Pipe Spring Branch, a tributary of Spring Creek, forms a portion of the CDP's southern boundary.

== Demographics ==
Historical population
Census	Pop.	Note	%±
2000	308		—
2010	312		1.3%
2020	276		−11.5%
U.S. Decennial Census

=== 2020 census ===
As of the 2020 census, Cedar Crest had a population of 276. The median age was 47.3 years. 16.7% of residents were under the age of 18 and 18.5% of residents were 65 years of age or older. For every 100 females there were 107.5 males, and for every 100 females age 18 and over there were 103.5 males age 18 and over.

0.0% of residents lived in urban areas, while 100.0% lived in rural areas.

There were 124 households in Cedar Crest, of which 26.6% had children under the age of 18 living in them. Of all households, 58.1% were married-couple households, 29.0% were households with a male householder and no spouse or partner present, and 10.5% were households with a female householder and no spouse or partner present. About 26.7% of all households were made up of individuals and 19.3% had someone living alone who was 65 years of age or older.

There were 144 housing units, of which 13.9% were vacant. The homeowner vacancy rate was 0.0% and the rental vacancy rate was 0.0%.

Racial composition as of the 2020 census
Race	Number	Percent
White	170	61.6%
Black or African American	1	0.4%
American Indian and Alaska Native	67	24.3%
Asian	1	0.4%
Native Hawaiian and Other Pacific Islander	0	0.0%
Some other race	0	0.0%
Two or more races	37	13.4%
Hispanic or Latino (of any race)	5	1.8%

=== 2000 census ===
As of the census of 2000, there were 308 people, 109 households, and 78 families residing in the CDP. The population density was 53.3 inhabitants per square mile (20.6/km^{2}). There were 123 housing units at an average density of 21.3/sq mi (8.2/km^{2}). The racial makeup of the CDP was 64.29% White, 25.97% Native American, and 9.74% from two or more races. Hispanic or Latino of any race were 2.27% of the population.

There were 109 households, out of which 39.4% had children under the age of 18 living with them, 53.2% were married couples living together, 9.2% had a female householder with no husband present, and 28.4% were non-families. 21.1% of all households were made up of individuals, and 7.3% had someone living alone who was 65 years of age or older. The average household size was 2.83 and the average family size was 3.35.

In the CDP, the population was spread out, with 33.4% under the age of 18, 7.1% from 18 to 24, 31.2% from 25 to 44, 21.4% from 45 to 64, and 6.8% who were 65 years of age or older. The median age was 31 years. For every 100 females, there were 111.0 males. For every 100 females age 18 and over, there were 107.1 males.

The median income for a household in the CDP was $26,053, and the median income for a family was $26,125. Males had a median income of $44,167 versus $21,979 for females. The per capita income for the CDP was $15,663. About 24.3% of families and 30.0% of the population were below the poverty line, including 27.8% of those under the age of eighteen and 47.4% of those 65 or over.

== Education ==
It is in the Locust Grove Public Schools school district.

== See also ==
- List of census-designated places in Oklahoma
