= Winganon, Oklahoma =

Unincorporated community in Oklahoma, US

- Unincorporated community
- Location within Oklahoma Location within the United States
- Coordinates: 36°33′14.4″N 95°33′39.9″W
- Country: United States
- State: Oklahoma
- County: Rogers
- Elevation: 669 ft (204 m)
- Time zone: UTC-6 (Central (CST))
  - Summer (DST): UTC-5 (CDT)
- Area code(s): 918 & 539

Winganon is an unincorporated community in northern Rogers County, Oklahoma, United States. It is located 1 mile (1.6 km) east of Oologah Lake and about 7 miles (11 km) west of Chelsea.

== Winganon Space Capsule ==
Winganon may be best known for its space capsule roadside curiosity, located on Winganon Road between Highway 169 and Oologah Lake (36.5828°N 95.65165°W). The "capsule" is actually the main vessel of a concrete-mixer truck, left next to the road "from a long-ago accident". Detail is lacking, but accounts indicate that after the vehicle rolled over on the side of the road, the company that owned it came and got the truck, but left the mixer behind due to the weight of the concrete it contained. When this happened is unclear; accounts range from the early 1970s to as far back as 1959. In 2008, a local couple and their friends came up with the idea of using canning lids, a garden hose, and other household items to make the mixer barrel look like a space capsule.
