= Peckham, Oklahoma =

- Unincorporated community
- Location within Oklahoma Location within the United States
- Coordinates: 36°53′12″N 97°10′41″W
- Country: United States
- State: Oklahoma
- County: Kay

Area
  - Total: 0.19 sq mi (0.48 km^{2})
  - Land: 0.19 sq mi (0.48 km^{2})
  - Water: 0 sq mi (0.00 km^{2})
- Elevation: 1,109 ft (338 m)

Population (2020)
  - Total: 38
  - Density: 206.5/sq mi (79.73/km^{2})
- Time zone: UTC-6 (Central (CST))
  - Summer (DST): UTC-5 (CDT)
- Area code: 580
- GNIS feature ID: 2805347

Peckham is an unincorporated community in Kay County, Oklahoma, United States. As of the 2020 census, Peckham had a population of 38. The community is 7 miles (11 km) west of Newkirk and 9 miles (14 km) northeast of Blackwell. It (and Eddy, Oklahoma) was named for railroad developer Ed L. Peckham. A post office opened in Peckham on July 15, 1899.

== Demographics ==
Historical population
Census	Pop.	Note	%±
2020	38		—
U.S. Decennial Census

=== 2020 census ===
As of the 2020 census, Peckham had a population of 38. The median age was 59.7 years. 0.0% of residents were under the age of 18 and 34.2% of residents were 65 years of age or older. For every 100 females there were 245.5 males, and for every 100 females age 18 and over there were 245.5 males age 18 and over.

0.0% of residents lived in urban areas, while 100.0% lived in rural areas.

There were 16 households in Peckham, of which 12.5% had children under the age of 18 living in them. Of all households, 50.0% were married-couple households, 25.0% were households with a male householder and no spouse or partner present, and 25.0% were households with a female householder and no spouse or partner present. About 37.5% of all households were made up of individuals and 0.0% had someone living alone who was 65 years of age or older.

There were 18 housing units, of which 11.1% were vacant. The homeowner vacancy rate was 0.0% and the rental vacancy rate was 0.0%.

Racial composition as of the 2020 census
Race	Number	Percent
White	38	100.0%
Black or African American	0	0.0%
American Indian and Alaska Native	0	0.0%
Asian	0	0.0%
Native Hawaiian and Other Pacific Islander	0	0.0%
Some other race	0	0.0%
Two or more races	0	0.0%
Hispanic or Latino (of any race)	0	0.0%
