= Muncy, Oklahoma =

- Unincorporated community
- Location within Oklahoma
- Coordinates: 36°49′12″N 101°45′46″W
- Country: United States
- State: Oklahoma
- County: Texas
- Elevation: 3,435 ft (1,047 m)
- Time zone: UTC-6 (Central (CST))
  - Summer (DST): UTC-5 (CDT)
- Area code: 580
- GNIS ID: 1100654

Muncy is an unincorporated community in Texas County, Oklahoma, United States. Sometimes called Tracy, it is 18.2 miles (29.3 km) west-northwest of Guymon.

== History ==
The Panhandle Townsite Company, owned by the principals of the Beaver, Meade and Englewood Railroad ("BM&E"), platted Tracy on May 1, 1931, intending for the community to become a commercial and agricultural center for the region on the BM&E line that extended from Forgan, Oklahoma to Keyes, Oklahoma. The Tracey Woodframe Grain Elevator in Muncy is listed on the National Register of Historic Places in Texas County, Oklahoma. Fred C. Tracy was the namesake of the town, being secretary of the BM&E for several years. Tracy, unlike many other towns on the line, failed to prosper, with the railroad arriving during the dust bowl having obvious effects. In later years the invention of the Diesel locomotive also harmed the town, since Diesel engines did not have to stop every 10 miles for water as the Steam locomotives did. Eva, Oklahoma to the town's west had greater success and an elevator there still remains today. The Tracey wood elevator did continue operation until around 1983. All that remains today is a scalehouse which may have been a remnant of the depot and the fallen elevator. The remains of the stock pens which once held cattle for shipment continue to exist to the northeast. The scars of the once-upon-a-time tracks still show their path, though the rails themselves were sold in the mid-1970’s. Milepost 77 of the line straightened out at Tracy, to finish its jog due west to mile post 103.5, end of track, at Keyes.
