= Old Bliss, Oklahoma =

Bliss
- Unincorporated community
- Location within the state of Oklahoma Bliss (the United States)
- Coordinates: 36°32′51″N 97°8′40″W
- Country: United States
- State: Oklahoma
- County: Noble
- Time zone: UTC-6 (Central (CST))
  - Summer (DST): UTC-5 (CDT)

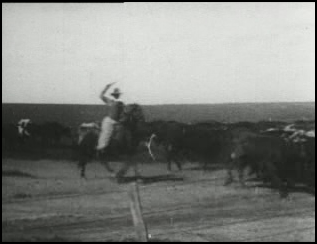
Scene from Edison Film Company movie in 1904 titled Driving Cattle to Pasture. Filmed at Bliss.

Bliss (now Old Bliss) is an unincorporated community 1.4 miles (2.3 km) southeast of Marland in Noble County, Oklahoma. Bliss was one of the 101 Ranch towns. The post office opened on November 4, 1894, but was moved to Marland on April 8, 1922.
