= Hontubby, Oklahoma =

Unincorporated community in Oklahoma, US

Coordinates: 34°51′01″N 94°33′58″W

Hontubby is an unincorporated community in Le Flore County, Oklahoma, United States.

== History ==
Hontubby was named for a local Choctaw Indian whose name means "wait and kill" in his native language.
