= Summerfield, Oklahoma =

- Unincorporated community
- Location within Oklahoma Location within the United States
- Coordinates: 34°53′55″N 94°51′58″W
- Country: United States
- State: Oklahoma
- County: Le Flore
- Elevation: 558 ft (170 m)
- Time zone: UTC-6 (Central (CST))
  - Summer (DST): UTC-5 (CDT)
- Area codes: 539 & 918
- GNIS feature ID: 1101683

Summerfield is an unincorporated community in Le Flore County, Oklahoma, United States.

Summerfield was the name of an early settler who operated a commissary.

It is the location of the Summerfield School, built in 1937, which is listed on the National Register of Historic Places.
