= Oak Grove, Pawnee County, Oklahoma =

- Town
- Location of Oak Grove, Pawnee County, Oklahoma
- Coordinates: 36°12′20″N 96°20′18″W
- Country: United States
- State: Oklahoma
- County: Pawnee

Area
  - Total: 0.13 sq mi (0.33 km^{2})
  - Land: 0.13 sq mi (0.33 km^{2})
  - Water: 0 sq mi (0.00 km^{2})
- Elevation: 774 ft (236 m)

Population (2020)
  - Total: 22
  - Density: 174.2/sq mi (67.25/km^{2})
- Time zone: UTC-6 (Central (CST))
  - Summer (DST): UTC-5 (CDT)
- FIPS code: 40-53210
- GNIS feature ID: 2413063

Oak Grove is a town in Pawnee County, Oklahoma, United States. The population was 22 as of the 2020 Census, up just slightly from the figure of 18 reported in both the 2000 census and the 2010 census.

== Geography ==
According to the United States Census Bureau, the town has a total area of 0.1 square miles (0.26 km^{2}), all land.

== Demographics ==
Historical population
Census	Pop.	Note	%±
2000	18		—
2010	18		0.0%
2020	22		22.2%
U.S. Decennial Census

As of the census of 2000, there were 18 people, 8 households, and 5 families residing in the town. The population density was 138.0 inhabitants per square mile (53.3/km^{2}). There were 9 housing units at an average density of 69.0 per square mile (26.6/km^{2}). The racial makeup of the town was 72.22% White, 27.78% from other races. Hispanic or Latino of any race were 33.33% of the population.

There were 8 households, out of which 37.5% had children under the age of 18 living with them, 37.5% were married couples living together, 25.0% had a female householder with no husband present, and 37.5% were non-families. 25.0% of all households were made up of individuals, and 12.5% had someone living alone who was 65 years of age or older. The average household size was 2.25 and the average family size was 2.80.

In the town, the population was spread out, with 22.2% under the age of 18, 5.6% from 18 to 24, 33.3% from 25 to 44, 22.2% from 45 to 64, and 16.7% who were 65 years of age or older. The median age was 36 years. For every 100 females, there were 80.0 males. For every 100 females age 18 and over, there were 100.0 males.

The median income for a household in the town was $56,250, and the median income for a family was $60,417. Males had a median income of $35,625 versus $21,250 for females. The per capita income for the town was $18,947. There were no families and 20.0% of the population living below the poverty line, including no under eighteens and 50.0% of those over 64.

== Education ==
It is in the Cleveland Public Schools school district.
