= Trousdale, Oklahoma =

Ghost Town in Oklahoma, United States

Coordinates: 35°02′28″N 97°02′34″W

Trousdale is a ghost town in Pottawatomie County, Oklahoma, at an elevation of 960 feet. It is located about 6 miles south of Tribbey, Oklahoma, just west of Oklahoma State Highway 102.

It was named for William F.A. "Billy" Trousdale, early sheriff of Pottawatomie County. The settlement was created on March 7, 1904, shortly after the railroad came through in 1903. In 1957 the citizens of Trousdale voted to annex their school district to Tribbey. The post office closed June 16, 1967.

== See also ==
- List of ghost towns in Oklahoma
