= Monroe, Oklahoma =

- Census-designated place
- Location within Oklahoma Location within the United States
- Coordinates: 34°59′37″N 94°30′56″W
- Country: United States
- State: Oklahoma
- County: Le Flore

Area
  - Total: 1.40 sq mi (3.62 km^{2})
  - Land: 1.40 sq mi (3.62 km^{2})
  - Water: 0 sq mi (0.00 km^{2})
- Elevation: 532 ft (162 m)

Population (2020)
  - Total: 164
  - Density: 117.2/sq mi (45.26/km^{2})
- Time zone: UTC-6 (Central (CST))
  - Summer (DST): UTC-5 (CDT)
- FIPS code: 40-49050
- GNIS feature ID: 2629931

Monroe is an unincorporated community and census-designated place in far eastern Le Flore County, Oklahoma, United States.

As of the 2020 census, Monroe had a population of 164.

A post office was established at Monroe, Indian Territory, on February 25, 1881. It was named for its first postmaster, Simon Monroe Griffith.

At the time of its founding, Monroe was located in Skullyville County, a part of the Moshulatubbee District of the Choctaw Nation.

== Demographics ==
Historical population
Census	Pop.	Note	%±
2020	164		—
U.S. Decennial Census

=== 2020 census ===
As of the 2020 census, Monroe had a population of 164. The median age was 55.8 years. 22.6% of residents were under the age of 18 and 32.3% of residents were 65 years of age or older. For every 100 females there were 80.2 males, and for every 100 females age 18 and over there were 92.4 males age 18 and over.

0.0% of residents lived in urban areas, while 100.0% lived in rural areas.

There were 59 households in Monroe, of which 35.6% had children under the age of 18 living in them. Of all households, 45.8% were married-couple households, 20.3% were households with a male householder and no spouse or partner present, and 25.4% were households with a female householder and no spouse or partner present. About 10.2% of all households were made up of individuals and 5.1% had someone living alone who was 65 years of age or older.

There were 74 housing units, of which 20.3% were vacant. The homeowner vacancy rate was 18.4% and the rental vacancy rate was 6.5%.

Racial composition as of the 2020 census
Race	Number	Percent
White	140	85.4%
Black or African American	0	0.0%
American Indian and Alaska Native	14	8.5%
Asian	1	0.6%
Native Hawaiian and Other Pacific Islander	0	0.0%
Some other race	1	0.6%
Two or more races	8	4.9%
Hispanic or Latino (of any race)	6	3.7%
