= Taylor, Beckham County, Oklahoma =

Unincorporated community in Oklahoma, US

Taylor
- Unincorporated community
- Location in Oklahoma Location in the United States
- Coordinates: 35°14′53″N 99°22′56″W
- Country: United States
- State: Oklahoma
- County: Beckham
- Elevation: 1,736 ft (529 m)
- Time zone: UTC-6 (Central (CST))
  - Summer (DST): UTC-5 (CDT)
- GNIS feature ID: 1100878

Taylor is an unincorporated community in Beckham County, Oklahoma. It was named after its first postmaster, Jeremiah H. Taylor. The post office operated from July 26, 1895, to May 4, 1899.
