= Teresita, Oklahoma =

- Census-designated place
- Location within Oklahoma
- Coordinates: 36°06′34″N 95°00′20″W
- Country: United States
- State: Oklahoma
- County: Cherokee

Area
  - Total: 9.74 sq mi (25.23 km^{2})
  - Land: 9.74 sq mi (25.23 km^{2})
  - Water: 0 sq mi (0.00 km^{2})
- Elevation: 876 ft (267 m)

Population (2020)
  - Total: 188
  - Density: 19.3/sq mi (7.45/km^{2})
- Time zone: UTC-6 (Central (CST))
  - Summer (DST): UTC-5 (CST)
- FIPS code: 40-72800
- GNIS feature ID: 2584393

Teresita is an unincorporated community and census-designated place (CDP) in Cherokee County, Oklahoma, United States. The population was 188 as of the 2020 Census, up from the population of 159 reported at the 2010 census.

== Geography ==
Teresita is located in northern Cherokee County at the junction of the valleys of Spring Creek and Double Spring Creek. Spring Creek is a west-flowing tributary of the Neosho River. The community is 15 miles (24 km) north of Tahlequah, the Cherokee County seat.

According to the United States Census Bureau, the Teresita CDP has a total area of 9.7 square miles (25.2 km^{2}), all land.

== Demographics ==
Historical population
Census	Pop.	Note	%±
2010	159		—
2020	188		18.2%
U.S. Decennial Census

=== 2020 census ===
As of the 2020 census, Teresita had a population of 188. The median age was 35.3 years. 29.8% of residents were under the age of 18 and 18.6% of residents were 65 years of age or older. For every 100 females there were 102.2 males, and for every 100 females age 18 and over there were 97.0 males age 18 and over.

0.0% of residents lived in urban areas, while 100.0% lived in rural areas.

There were 67 households in Teresita, of which 38.8% had children under the age of 18 living in them. Of all households, 56.7% were married-couple households, 14.9% were households with a male householder and no spouse or partner present, and 25.4% were households with a female householder and no spouse or partner present. About 14.9% of all households were made up of individuals and 9.0% had someone living alone who was 65 years of age or older.

There were 79 housing units, of which 15.2% were vacant. The homeowner vacancy rate was 3.6% and the rental vacancy rate was 30.0%.

Racial composition as of the 2020 census
Race	Number	Percent
White	84	44.7%
Black or African American	1	0.5%
American Indian and Alaska Native	56	29.8%
Asian	3	1.6%
Native Hawaiian and Other Pacific Islander	0	0.0%
Some other race	0	0.0%
Two or more races	44	23.4%
Hispanic or Latino (of any race)	9	4.8%

=== 2010 census ===
As of the 2010 United States census, Teresita had a population of 159.
