= Moodys, Oklahoma =

Unincorporated community in Oklahoma, US

Moodys, Oklahoma ᎽᏗ (Cherokee)
- Unincorporated community
- Location within Oklahoma Location within the United States
- Coordinates: 36°01′56″N 94°57′21″W
- Country: United States
- State: Oklahoma
- County: Cherokee

Area
  - Total: 17.48 sq mi (45.28 km^{2})
  - Land: 17.48 sq mi (45.27 km^{2})
  - Water: 0.0039 sq mi (0.01 km^{2})
- Elevation: 932 ft (284 m)

Population (2020)
  - Total: 854
  - Density: 48.9/sq mi (18.87/km^{2})
- Time zone: UTC-6 (Central (CST))
  - Summer (DST): UTC-5 (CDT)
- ZIP code: 74444
- Area codes: 918 & 539
- GNIS feature ID: 2805342

Moodys (Cherokee: ᎽᏗ) is an unincorporated community in Cherokee County, Oklahoma, United States. As of the 2020 census, Moodys had a population of 854. The community is 8 miles (13 km) north of Tahlequah. Moodys has a post office with ZIP code 74444, which opened on March 21, 1896.

== Demographics ==
Historical population
Census	Pop.	Note	%±
2020	854		—
U.S. Decennial Census

=== 2020 census ===
As of the 2020 census, Moodys had a population of 854. The median age was 37.3 years. 28.1% of residents were under the age of 18 and 19.2% of residents were 65 years of age or older. For every 100 females there were 95.0 males, and for every 100 females age 18 and over there were 106.0 males age 18 and over.

0.0% of residents lived in urban areas, while 100.0% lived in rural areas.

There were 300 households in Moodys, of which 37.0% had children under the age of 18 living in them. Of all households, 53.7% were married-couple households, 15.7% were households with a male householder and no spouse or partner present, and 22.0% were households with a female householder and no spouse or partner present. About 25.3% of all households were made up of individuals and 14.7% had someone living alone who was 65 years of age or older.

There were 351 housing units, of which 14.5% were vacant. The homeowner vacancy rate was 1.2% and the rental vacancy rate was 3.1%.

Racial composition as of the 2020 census
Race	Number	Percent
White	348	40.7%
Black or African American	5	0.6%
American Indian and Alaska Native	387	45.3%
Asian	3	0.4%
Native Hawaiian and Other Pacific Islander	0	0.0%
Some other race	9	1.1%
Two or more races	102	11.9%
Hispanic or Latino (of any race)	32	3.7%
