= List of Green Bay Packers in the Pro Football Hall of Fame =

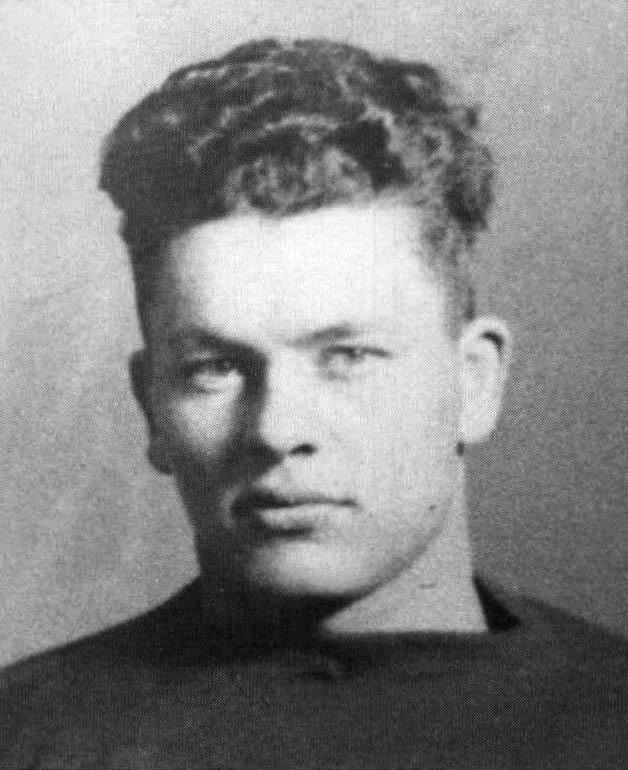
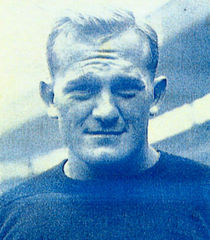
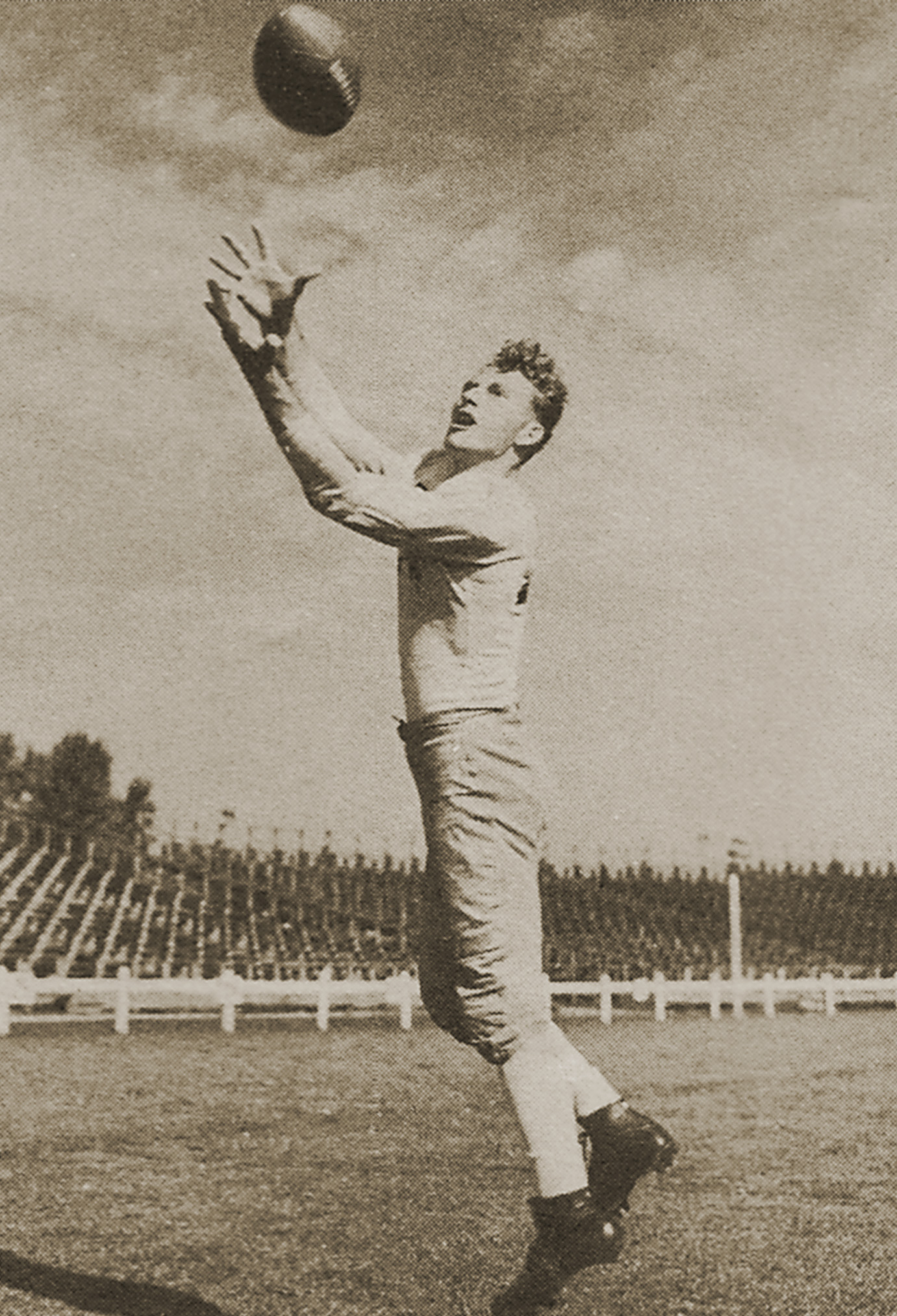
Curly Lambeau (left), Cal Hubbard (center) and Don Hutson (right) were three of the four Packers who were part of the inaugural 1963 Pro Football Hall of Fame class of inductees.

The Green Bay Packers are a professional American football team based in Green Bay, Wisconsin. The Packers have competed in the National Football League (NFL) since 1921, two years after their original founding by Curly Lambeau and George Whitney Calhoun. They are members of the Northern Division of the National Football Conference (NFC) and play their home games at Lambeau Field in central Wisconsin. Since entering the NFL, the Packers have won 13 championships (the most in NFL history), including nine NFL Championships prior to 1966 and four Super Bowls, which is inclusive of two additional NFL Championships won during the AFL–NFL merger, since then. They have captured 21 divisional titles, 9 conference championships, and been to the playoffs 37 times.

In 1963, the Pro Football Hall of Fame was created to honor the history of professional American football and the individuals who have greatly influenced it. Since the charter induction class of 1963, 36 individuals who have played, coached or managed for the Packers have been inducted into the Pro Football Hall of Fame. Of the 36 inductees, 29 made their primary contribution to football with the Packers, while seven only contributed a minor portion of their career to the Packers. The 29 inductees who have spent a significant portion of their career with the Packers have their names presented on the façade around the inside of Lambeau Field along with the years they spent in Green Bay. Additionally, all 29 of these players plus Jan Stenerud have been inducted into the Green Bay Packers Hall of Fame, while Don Hutson, Tony Canadeo, Bart Starr, Ray Nitschke, Reggie White and Brett Favre have had their uniform numbers retired.

Of the original 17 individuals inducted in 1963, four spent the major part of their career with the Green Bay Packers. This includes the founder, player and head coach Curly Lambeau, All-Pro offensive tackle Cal Hubbard, the 1941 and 1942 Most Valuable Player Don Hutson, and four-time NFL champion Johnny Blood. The first two decades of the Hall of Fame's existence saw 17 Packers enshrined, including one inductee who was not a player for the Packers: Vince Lombardi. Coaching the Packers from 1959 to 1967, Lombardi led the team to five NFL Championships, plus winning the first two Super Bowls after the AFL–NFL merger, and an overall winning percentage of .754. The only other non-player for the Packers to be inducted was Ron Wolf, who served as the general manager for the Packers during the 1990s, which included their victory in Super Bowl XXXI. From 2013 to 2022, the Packers have had one person inducted into the Hall of Fame seven out of the ten years, including three straight from 2020 to 2022. In August 2025, Sterling Sharpe became the most recent Packer to be inducted into the hall of fame.

== Inductees ==
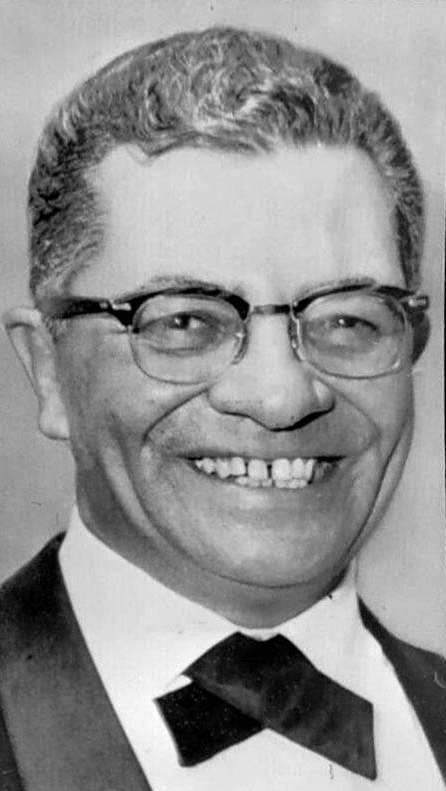
Vince Lombardi was posthumously inducted in 1973 after coaching the Packers to five championships

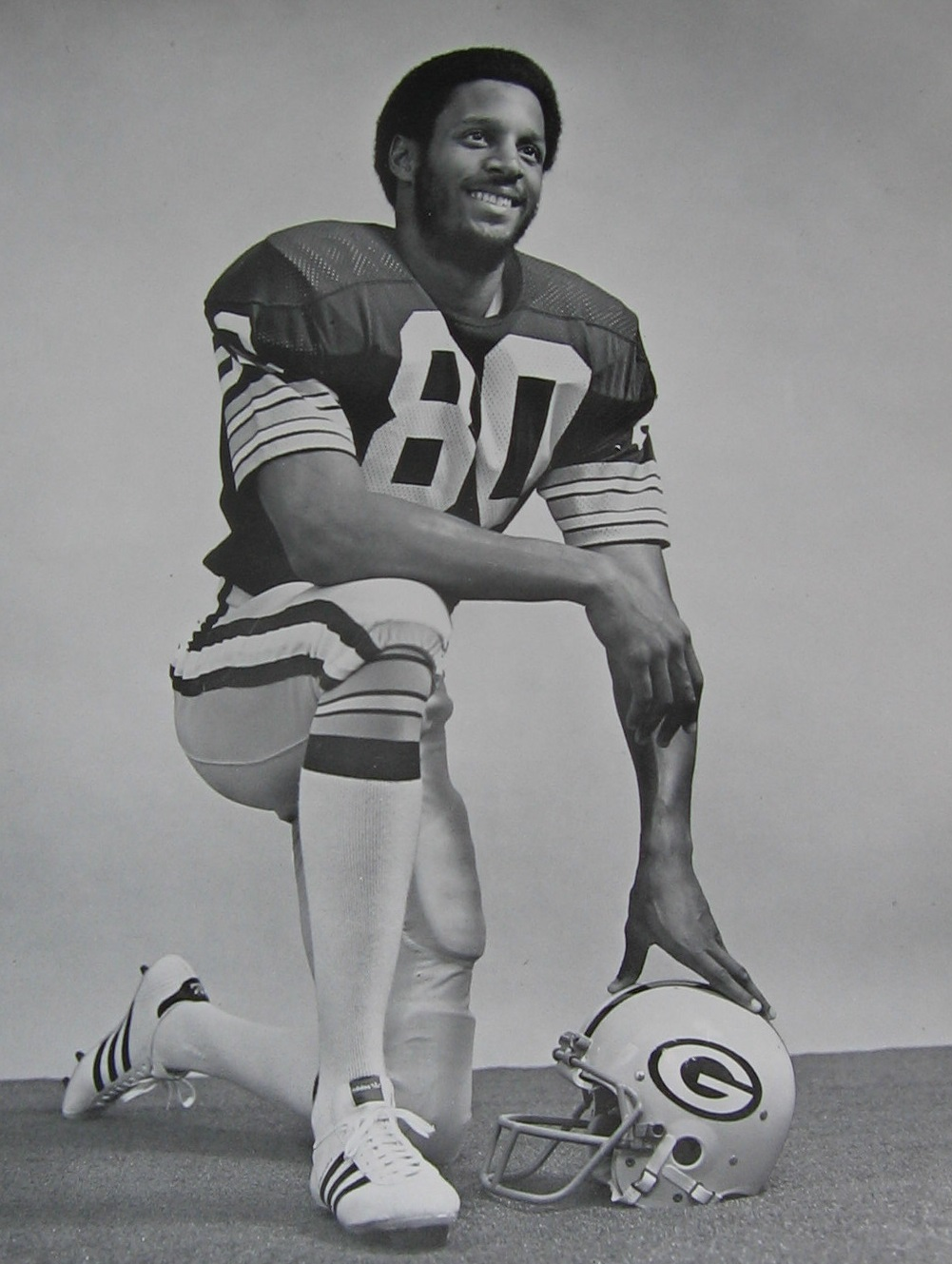
James Lofton played nine seasons with the Packers, was inducted in 2003

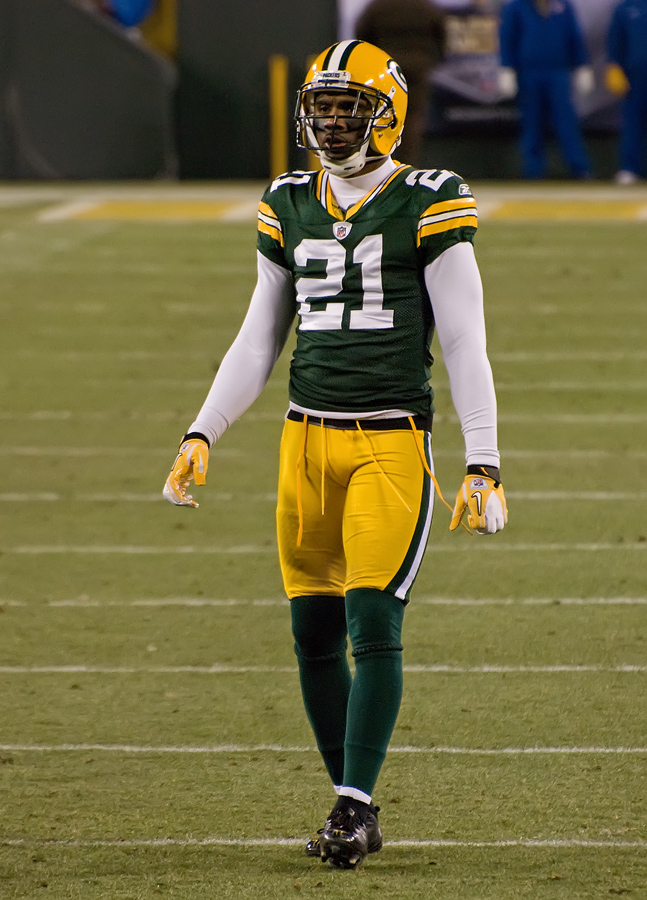
Charles Woodson, who played seven seasons with the Packers, was inducted in 2021

Green Bay Packers in the Pro Football Hall of Fame
Year inducted	Inductee	Position(s)	Seasons with the Packers	Career accomplishments				Refs
Year inducted	Inductee	Position(s)	Seasons with the Packers	All-Pros		Pro Bowls (Note: Includes all selections to the NFL All-Star team (1939 – 1942), the Pro Bowl (1951 – present) and the AFL All-Star game (1961 – 1969).)	Awards	Refs
Year inducted	Inductee	Position(s)	Seasons with the Packers	First-team	Second-team	Pro Bowls	Awards	Refs
1963	Curly Lambeau	Halfback	1919–29	0	3	0	Awards	
1963	Curly Lambeau	Coach	1919–49	0	3	0		
1963	Cal Hubbard	Tackle	1929–1933, 1935	4	0	0		
1963	Don Hutson	End	1935–1945	8	0	4	2× MVP (1941, 1942)	
1963	Johnny Blood	Halfback	1929–1933, 1935–1936	0	0	0		
1964	Clarke Hinkle	Fullback	1932–1941	7	1	3		
1964	Clarke Hinkle	Linebacker	1932–1941	7	1	3		
1964	Mike Michalske	Guard	1929–1935, 1937	7	0	0		
1966	Arnie Herber	Quarterback	1930–1940	1	2	1		
1966	Walt Kiesling (Note: Kiesling spent his career with six different teams, spending the most time with the Chicago Cardinals.)	Guard	1935–1936	3	1	0		
1967	Emlen Tunnell (Note: Tunnell spent most of his career with the New York Giants.)	Defensive back	1959–1961	6	2	10		
1971	Vince Lombardi	Coach	1959–1967	NA	NA	NA	2× COY (1959, 1961)	
1974	Tony Canadeo	Back	1941–1944, 1946–1952	2	1	0		
1976	Len Ford (Note: Ford spent most of his career with the Cleveland Browns.)	Defensive end	1958	4	1	4		
1976	Jim Taylor	Fullback	1958–1966	3	3	5	1× MVP (1962)	
1977	Forrest Gregg	Offensive tackle	1956, 1958–1970	7	2	9		
1977	Bart Starr	Quarterback	1956–1971	1	3	4	1× MVP (1966); 2× SB MVP (1966, 1967)	
1978	Ray Nitschke	Linebacker	1958–1972	2	5	1		
1980	Herb Adderley	Defensive back	1961–1969	5	3	5		
1981	Willie Davis	Defensive end	1960–1969	5	1	5		
1981	Jim Ringo	Center	1953–1963	7	3	10		
1986	Paul Hornung	Halfback	1957–1962, 1964–1966	2	1	2	1× MVP (1961)	
1986	Paul Hornung	Placekicker	1957–1962, 1964–1966	2	1	2	1× MVP (1961)	
1989	Willie Wood	Defensive back	1960–1971	5	4	8		
1990	Ted Hendricks (Note: Hendricks spent most of his career with the Oakland/Los Angeles Raiders.)	Linebacker	1974	4	2	8		
1991	Jan Stenerud (Note: Stenerud spent most of his career with the Kansas City Chiefs.)	Placekicker	1980–1983	6	3	6		
1995	Henry Jordan	Defensive tackle	1959–1969	5	2	4		
2003	James Lofton	Wide receiver	1978–1986	1	3	8		
2006	Reggie White	Defensive end	1993–1998	8	5	13	3× DPOY (1987, 1991, 1995)	
2013	Dave Robinson	Linebacker	1963–1972	1	2	3		
2015	Ron Wolf	General Manager	1991–2001	NA	NA	NA	1× EOY (1992)	
2016	Brett Favre	Quarterback	1992–2007	3	3	11	3× MVP (1995, 1996, 1997); 2× OPOY (1995, 1996)	
2018	Jerry Kramer	Guard	1958–1968	5	2	3		
2020	Bobby Dillon	Defensive back	1952–1959	4	1	4		
2021	Charles Woodson	Defensive back	2006–2012	4	4	9	1× DROY (1998); 1× DPOY (2009)	
2022	LeRoy Butler	Defensive back	1990–2001	4	0	4		
2024	Steve McMichael (Note: McMichael spent most of his career with the Chicago Bears.)	Defensive tackle	1994	3	2	3		
2024	Julius Peppers (Note: Peppers spent most of his career with the Carolina Panthers.)	Defensive end	2014–2016	4	3	9	1× DROY (2002)	
2025	Sterling Sharpe	Wide receiver	1988–1994	3	0	5		

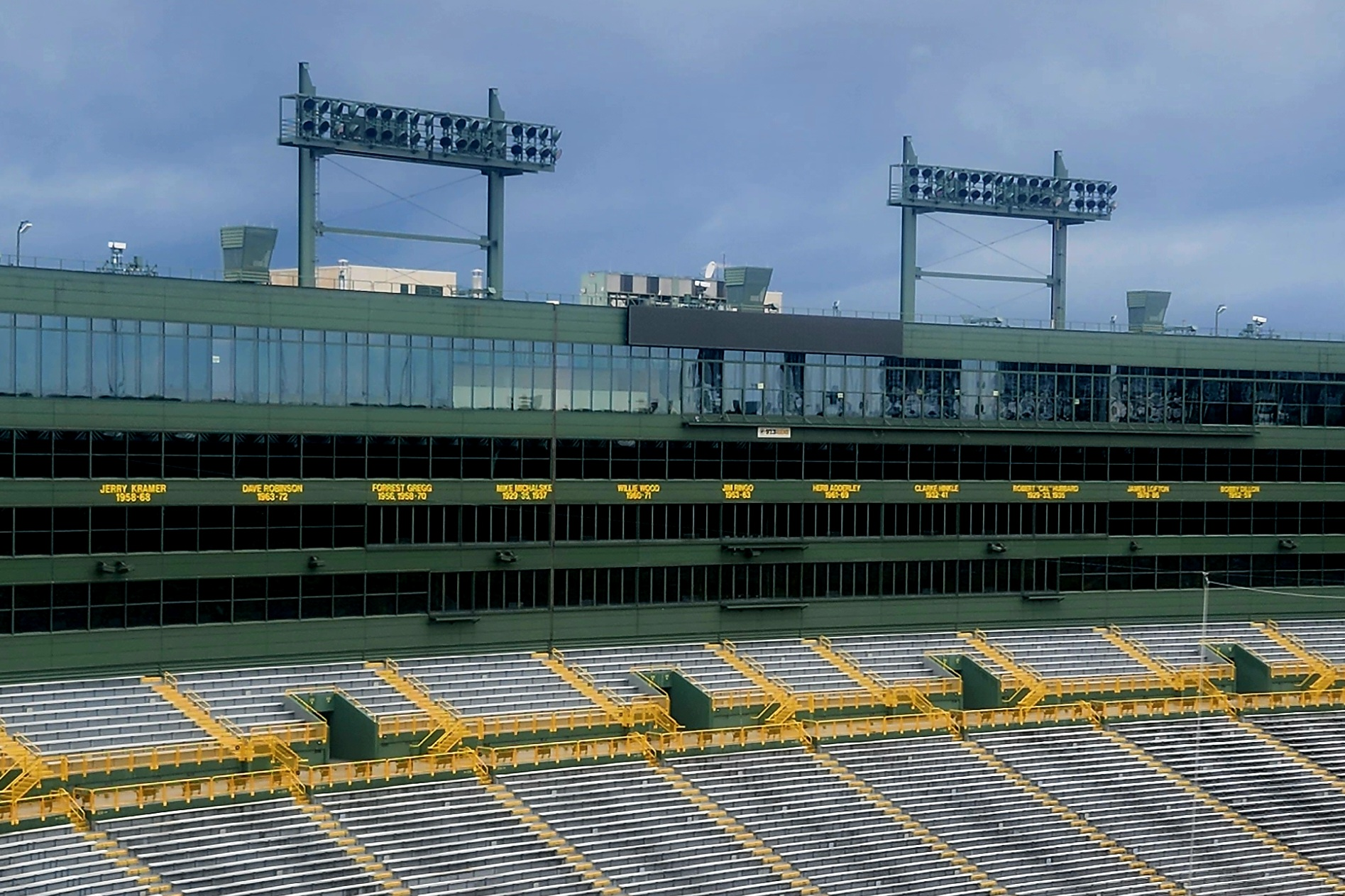
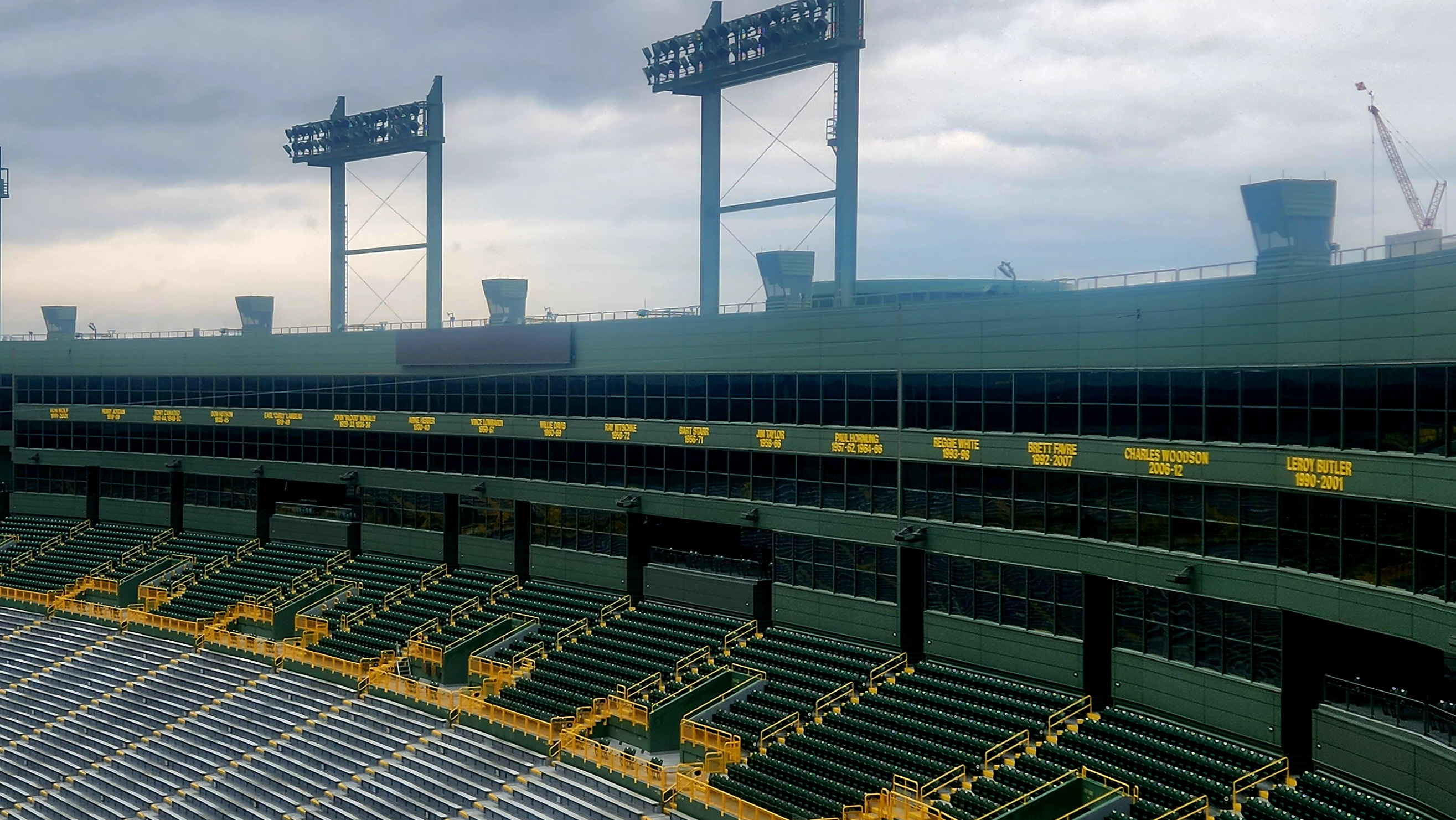
All of the names of the Green Bay Packers players in the Pro Football Hall of Fame are printed along the inside of Lambeau Field, shown here in 2024.

== See also ==
- Lists of Green Bay Packers players
