= List of Green Bay Packers award winners =

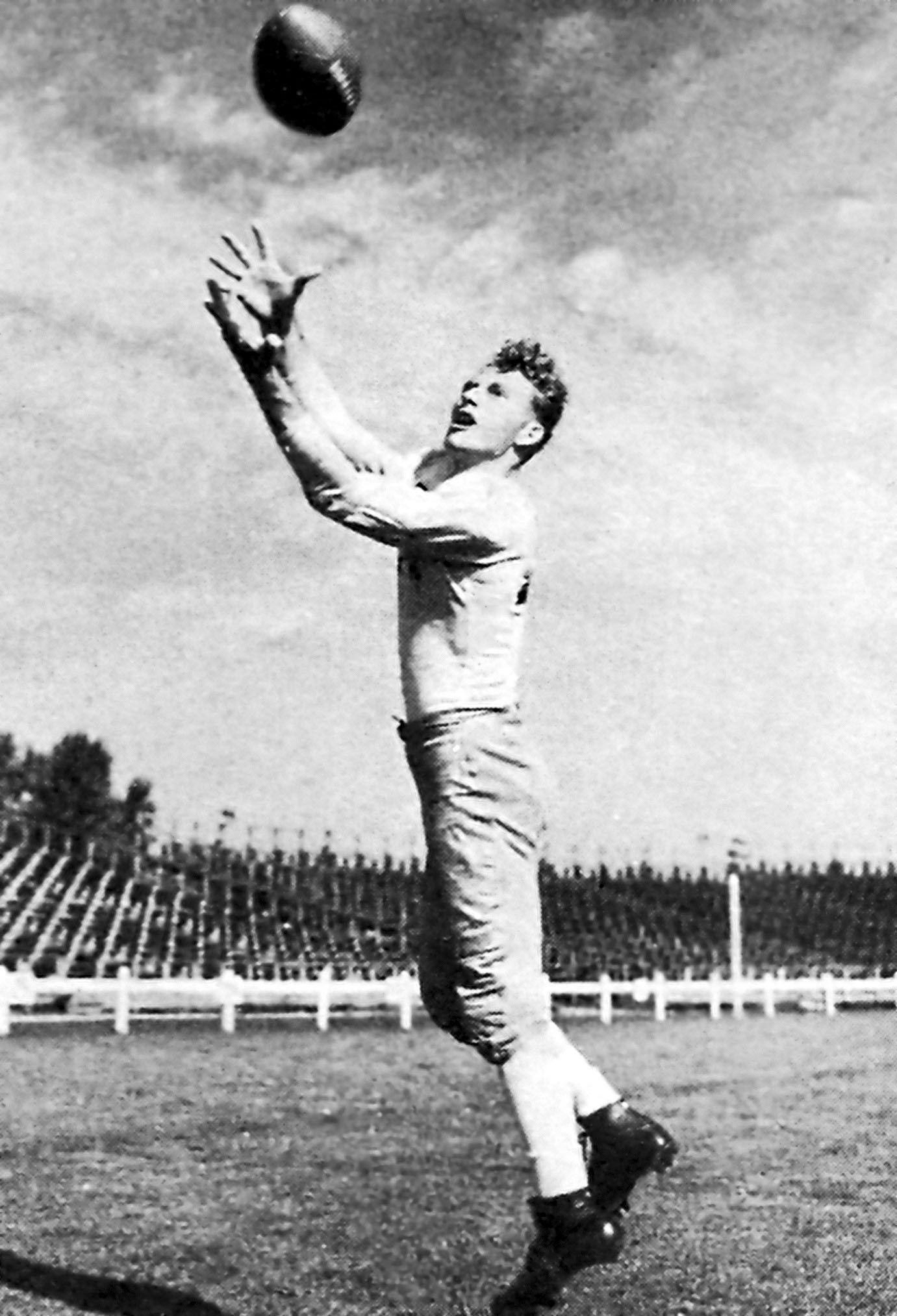
Don Hutson won the Joe F. Carr Trophy in 1941 and 1942, becoming the first Packers player to win an MVP award.

The Green Bay Packers are a professional American football team based in Green Bay, Wisconsin. The Packers have competed in the National Football League (NFL) since 1921, two years after their original founding by Curly Lambeau and George Whitney Calhoun. They are members of the North Division of the National Football Conference (NFC) and play their home games at Lambeau Field in central Wisconsin. The Packers have won 13 championships (the most in NFL history), including nine NFL Championships prior to 1966 and four Super Bowls since then. They have captured 21 divisional titles, 9 conference championships, and been to the playoffs 36 times. In NFL history, the Packers have recorded the most regular season victories (819) and the most overall victories (856) of any team, and have the second most playoff wins (37).

Dating back to the early years of professional football, NFL players, coaches and executives have been given numerous awards recognizing their on-the-field and off-the-field accomplishments. These awards historically have been given out by the NFL itself, or by various news organizations, including the Associated Press (AP), United Press International (UPI), Newspaper Enterprise Association (NEA), The Sporting News (SN), the Pro Football Writers of America (PFWA) and Pro Football Weekly (PFW), among others. They are typically given annually based on what happened during the preceding NFL season. In 1938, the NFL identified the most valuable player (MVP) of the preceding season by giving out the Joe F. Carr Trophy. Don Hutson became the first Packers player to receive this award, winning back-to-back in 1941 and 1942. Over the years, new awards have been created to recognize specific accomplishments. This includes player of the year (often identifying an offensive and defensive player of the year), rookie of the year and comeback player of the year. In addition to player awards, coaches, assistant coaches and executives have all had awards developed to identify their contributions to the success of a team. Although on-field performance awards are widely recognized, various organizations have also developed awards recognizing community service, outstanding character, sportsmanship, and philanthropy. One such award, the Bart Starr Award, was named in honor of Packers' quarterback Bart Starr.

== Team awards ==
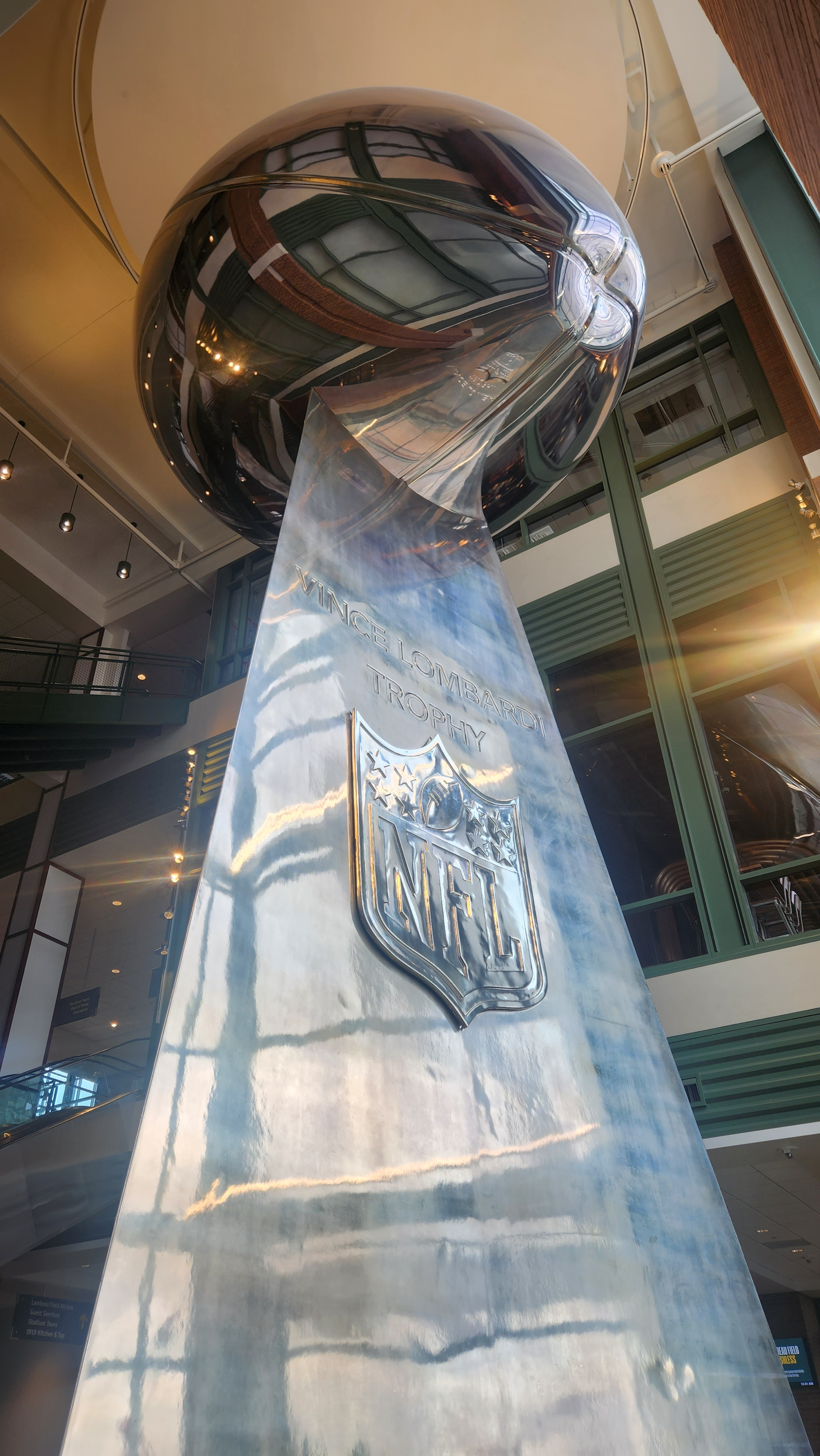
A large replica of the Vince Lombardi Trophy located at Lambeau Field

The Green Bay Packers won the NFL Championship in 1929, 1930 and 1931, although at the time no formal award or trophy was given out. Starting in 1936, the NFL gave the season's champion the Ed Thorp Memorial Trophy, which continued until 1967. The Packers received this award eight times: 1936, 1939, 1944, 1961, 1962, 1965, 1966 and 1967. They are the only team in NFL history to win the championship three straight seasons, having done so twice. After the AFL–NFL merger, the winner of the Super Bowl was given the Vince Lombardi Trophy, which was named after Green Bay's head coach Vince Lombardi. The Packers have won four Super Bowls, in 1966, 1967, 1996 and 2010. Since 1984, the winner of the NFC Championship game has been awarded the George Halas Trophy. The Packers have won this trophy three times: 1996, 1997 and 2010.

Green Bay Packers team awards
Award	Accomplishment	Seasons awarded	Refs.			
Award	Accomplishment	Seasons awarded	Refs.	None	NFL champion (1920–32)	1929, 1930, 1931
Ed Thorp Memorial Trophy	NFL champion (1933–67)	1936, 1939, 1944, 1961, 1962, 1965, 1966, 1967				
George Halas Trophy	NFC champion (1984–present)	1996, 1997, 2010				
Vince Lombardi Trophy	Super Bowl champion (1966–present)	1966, 1967, 1996, 2010				

== Individual awards ==
Awarding organizations
AP	Associated Press
KC 101	Kansas City Committee of 101 awards
Maxwell	Maxwell Football Club
NEA	Newspaper Enterprise Association
NFL	National Football League
PFW	Pro Football Weekly
PFWA	Pro Football Writers of America
SN	The Sporting News
UPI	United Press International

=== Most Valuable Player ===
From 1938 to 1946, the NFL awarded the Joe F. Carr Trophy to the most valuable player (MVP) in the NFL, as decided by a panel of sportswriters. Starting in the 1940s and 1950s, various news organizations began handing out their own MVP awards, often based on the opinions or voting of their sportswriters. In 1948, UPI awarded their first MVP award: the UPI NFL MVP Award. In 1954, SN began awarding its NFL Player of the Year Award and the next year the NEA awarded their first MVP award, known as the Jim Thorpe Trophy. Three years later, the AP awarded their first NFL Most Valuable Player award, in 1957. Lastly, PFWA gave out their NFL MVP Award for the first time in 1966, although they did not name another MVP until 1975. The AP and PFWA have named MVPs each season since 1957 and 1975, respectively. SN named an MVP every year from 1954 to 1969, and then from 1980 to 2007. UPI stopped awarding their MVP award in 1969 and the last Jim Thorpe Trophy was awarded in 2008.

Since 1941, six players for the Packers have won at least one of the aforementioned MVP awards, with 29 MVP awards going to these players. Don Hutson, who played wide receiver for the Packers in the 1930s and 1940s, won back-to-back Joe F. Carr Trophies during the 1941 and 1942 NFL seasons. Both seasons Hutson achieved the triple crown for receivers: he led the NFL in receptions, receiving yards and receiving touchdowns. In addition to his role on offense, Hutson also recorded eight interceptions spanning both of his MVP seasons and was the team's placekicker. In 1961, Paul Hornung won his first and only MVP awards from the AP and the UPI after leading the NFL in points scored. In addition to his scoring record, Hornung rushed for 597 yards, had 145 receiving yards, completed three passes and kicked 15 field goals. The next season, Hornung's teammate Jim Taylor won four different MVP awards from the AP, SN, the NEA (the Jim Thorpe Trophy) and the PFWA. Taylor, similar to Hutson as a wide receiver, won the rushing triple crown; he led the league in rushing attempts, rushing yards and rushing touchdowns in 1962. Four years later, Bart Starr, the Packers quarterback, won all five MVP awards that were awarded in the 1966 NFL season (AP, UPI, SN, the NEA and the PFWA). Starr led the NFL in a number of efficiency statistics, including completion percentage and quarterback rating. All three MVP awardees during the 1960s played under head coach Vince Lombardi; the Packers won the NFL Championship in all three seasons where they had an MVP awardee (1961, 1962 and 1966), which included the first Super Bowl.

The Packers during the 1970 and 1980s were unsuccessful on the playing field, with the team only going to the playoffs once each decade. However, in the 1990s the team traded for quarterback Brett Favre, who led the team back to perennial playoff contention. Starting in 1995, Favre won three consecutive AP MVP awards, becoming the first player to do so. He also won the MVP awards from PFWA and SN in 1995 and 1996, while also winning three straight Jim Thorpe Trophies from 1995 to 1997. During the 1996 season, Favre led the Packers to their first NFL Championship since 1967 with a victory in Super Bowl XXXI. From 1995 to 1997, Favre led the NFL in passing touchdowns and was near the top in most passing statistical categories. Favre and Barry Sanders shared the 1997 award from AP, only the second time this had occurred. Sanders had just completed the season with over 2,000 rushing yards, becoming only the third person to do so in one season, and had statistically one of the best seasons ever by a running back. Favre led the Packers to a second consecutive Super Bowl appearance that season, losing to the Denver Broncos in Super Bowl XXXII. In 2007, Favre was traded to the New York Jets and his back-up quarterback, Aaron Rodgers, took over. Rodgers won his first AP and SN MVP awards in 2011, after guiding the Packers to a 15–1 regular season record while leading the NFL in most quarterback efficiency statistics, including setting the record for the highest quarterback rating in a season at 122.5. Rodgers went on to win the AP and SN MVP awards three more seasons, in 2014, 2020, and 2021. Each season, Rodgers guided the Packers to the playoffs and led the NFL in various passing statistical categories, including posting a quarterback rating of 121.5 in 2020, just one point short of his NFL record from 2011. (Note: Note: The Packers went to the playoffs in 2011, 2014, 2020 and 2021.; Rodgers led the league in various passing statistics each of those years.; Rodgers' passer rating in 2011 was 122.5 and in 2020 was 121.5; these are the first and second highest totals in NFL history.)

Green Bay Packers players who won a season MVP award
Image	Player	Position	Years with Packers	MVP awards						Refs.
Image	Player	Position	Years with Packers	NFL (Joe F. Carr Trophy)	AP	UPI	NEA (Jim Thorpe Trophy)	SN	PFWA	Refs.
Black and white photo of Hornung running with the football	Don Hutson	Wide receiver	1935–1945	1941 (1)	—	—	—	—	—	
Black and white photo of Hornung running with the football	Don Hutson	Wide receiver	1935–1945	1942 (2)	—	—	—	—	—	
Playing card showing a photo of Hornung smiling	Paul Hornung	Halfback	1957–1962; 1964–1966	—	1961 (1)	1961 (1)	—	—	—	
Playing card showing a photo of Taylor kneeling in uniform with a football	Jim Taylor	Fullback	1958–1966	—	1962 (1)	—	1962 (1)	—	—	
Playing card showing a photo of Starr in uniform	Bart Starr	Quarterback	1956–1971	—	1966 (1)	1966 (1)	1966 (1)	1966 (1)	1966 (1)	
Favre in a shirt and jacket smiling	Brett Favre	Quarterback	1992–2007	—	1995 (1)	—	1995 (1)	1995 (1)	1995 (1)	
Favre in a shirt and jacket smiling	Brett Favre	Quarterback	1992–2007	—	1996 (2)	—	1996 (2)	1996 (2)	1996 (2)	
Favre in a shirt and jacket smiling	Brett Favre	Quarterback	1992–2007	—	1997 (3)	—	—	—	—	
Rodgers in uniform smiling.	Aaron Rodgers	Quarterback	2005–2022	—	2011 (1)	—	—	—	2011 (1)	
Rodgers in uniform smiling.	Aaron Rodgers	Quarterback	2005–2022	—	2014 (2)	—	—	—	2014 (2)	
Rodgers in uniform smiling.	Aaron Rodgers	Quarterback	2005–2022	—	2020 (3)	—	—	—	2020 (3)	
Rodgers in uniform smiling.	Aaron Rodgers	Quarterback	2005–2022	—	2021 (4)	—	—	—	2021 (4)	

=== Player of the Year ===
Numerous organizations have awarded player of the year awards, including AP, UPI, SN, PFWA, NEA, Maxwell (called the Bert Bell Award) and the Kansas City Committee of 101 (KC 101). The award is typically given out to the top performer from the previous season. Each award is different, with some giving out two awards: one for an offensive player and one for a defensive player (this includes AP, UPI, SN, NEA and PFWA). Maxwell gives out the Bert Bell Award to just one player with no distinction. KC 101 gives out offensive and defensive awards to each conference, for a total of four winners each season. The UPI and NEA are now defunct, ending in 1996 and 1998, respectively. Starting in 2014, the Polynesian Football Hall of Fame also awards the Polynesian Football Player of the Year Award, although no Packers player has won that award.

Hornung won the first player of the year award for the Packers in 1961, from Maxwell. Hornung led the league in scoring and was a triple-threat man: he had almost 750 total yards, scored 10 total touchdowns, completed 3 passes and made 15 field goals. Hornung also won the MVP that year and was a first-team All-Pro. Tim Harris was the next winner of a player of the year award, doing so in 1989 from NEA. Harris, who was also first-team All-Pro that season, was second in the NFL with 19.5 sacks. 1995 saw two Packers win multiple player of the year awards: Brett Favre won awards from Maxwell, AP, PFWA and UPI, while Reggie White won awards from UPI and KC 101. Favre led the NFL in both passing yards and passing touchdowns, while also securing an MVP award and first-team All-Pro honors. White, who was also first-team All-Pro, was tied for 6th place in sacks in 1995. Favre continued his success into 1996, where he secured player of the year awards from Maxwell, PFWA and UPI. Favre again led the league in passing touchdowns while leading the Packers to their first Super Bowl victory since Super Bowl II. In 1998, White won player of the year awards with the Packers again, this time from NEA, AP, PFWA and KC 101. He was second in the NFL with 16 sacks that season. Charles Woodson and Clay Matthews III won back-to-back player of the year awards for the Packers in 2009 and 2010, respectively. Woodson, who won awards from AP, PFWA, UPI and KC 101, was tied for first place in the NFL with nine interceptions, including three returned for a touchdown. Matthews, who won awards from AP, UPI and KC 101, was fourth in the NFL in 2010 in sacks with 13.5, while also returning 1 interception for a touchdown. Aaron Rodgers won player of the year awards twice for the Packers, in 2011 (from Maxwell, PFWA and SN) and 2014 (SN). Both seasons Rodgers also won MVP awards and was first-team All-Pro. In 2011, Rodgers set an NFL record with a 122.5 quarterback rating, while also being in the top 5 of numerous passing statistics. In 2014, Rodgers had another season of being in the top 10 for most passing statistics, including passing yards, touchdowns and quarterback rating. In 2025 during his first season with the Packers, Micah Parsons was named the defensive player of the year for the NFC by KC 101, despite missing time at the end of the season due to a knee injury.

Green Bay Packers players who won a player of the year award
Image	Player	Position	Years with Packers	Player of the year awards							Refs.
Image	Player	Position	Years with Packers	Maxwell (Bert Bell Award)	NEA (OFF & DEF)	AP (OFF & DEF)	PFWA (OFF & DEF)	UPI (OFF & DEF)	KC 101 (OFF & DEF)	SN (OFF & DEF)	Refs.
Playing card showing a photo of Hornung smiling	Paul Hornung	Halfback	1957–1962; 1964–1966	1961 (1)	—	—	—	—	—	—	
	Tim Harris	Linebacker	1986–1990	—	1989 (1) (Note: The NEA awarded an offensive and defensive player of the year; Harris won the defensive award.)	—	—	—	—	—	
White smiling in a suit and tie	Reggie White	Defensive end	1993–1998	—	—	—	—	1995 (1) (Note: From 1975 to 1996, UPI awarded an offensive and defensive player of the year award to players in the NFC; White won the defensive award.)	1995 (1) (Note: KC 101 awards an offensive and defensive player of the year award to players in the NFC and American Football Conference (AFC); White won the defensive award for the NFC.)	—	
White smiling in a suit and tie	Reggie White	Defensive end	1993–1998	—	1998 (1) (Note: The NEA awarded an offensive and defensive player of the year; White won the defensive award.)	1998 (1) (Note: The AP awards an offensive and defensive player of the year award each season; White won the defensive award.)	1998 (1) (Note: PFWA awards an offensive and defensive player of the year award each season; White won the defensive award.)	—	1998 (2)	—	
Favre in uniform on the field during a game	Brett Favre	Quarterback	1992–2007	1995 (1)	—	1995 (1) (Note: The AP awards an offensive and defensive player of the year award each season; Favre won the offensive award.)	1995 (1) (Note: PFWA awards an offensive and defensive player of the year award each season; Favre won the offensive award.)	1995 (1) (Note: From 1975 to 1996, UPI awarded an offensive and defensive player of the year award to players in the NFC; Favre won the offensive award.)	—	—	
Favre in uniform on the field during a game	Brett Favre	Quarterback	1992–2007	1996 (2)	—	—	1996 (2)	1996 (1)	—	—	
Woodson in uniform on the field during a game	Charles Woodson	Defensive back	2006–2012	—	—	2009 (1) (Note: The AP awards an offensive and defensive player of the year award each season; Woodson won the defensive award.)	2009 (1) (Note: PFWA awards an offensive and defensive player of the year award each season; Woodson won the defensive award.)	—	2009 (1) (Note: KC 101 awards an offensive and defensive player of the year award to players in the NFC and AFC; Woodson won the defensive award for the NFC.)	2009 (1) (Note: SN awards their player of the year award to an offensive and defensive player; Woodson won the defensive award.)	
Matthews in uniform on the field during a game	Clay Matthews III	Linebacker	2009–2018	—	—	2010 (1) (Note: The AP awards an offensive and defensive player of the year award each season; Matthews won the defensive award.)	—	—	2010 (1) (Note: KC 101 awards an offensive and defensive player of the Year award to players in the NFC and AFC; Matthews won the defensive award for the NFC.)	2010 (1) (Note: SN awards their player of the year award to an offensive and defensive player; Matthews won the defensive award.)	
Rodgers under center about to snap the football during a game	Aaron Rodgers	Quarterback	2005–2022	2011 (1)	—	—	2011 (1) (Note: PFWA awards an offensive and defensive player of the year award each season; Rodgers won the offensive award.)	—	—	2011 (1) (Note: SN awards their player of the year award to an offensive and defensive player; Rodgers won the offensive award.)	
Rodgers under center about to snap the football during a game	Aaron Rodgers	Quarterback	2005–2022	—	—	—	—	—	—	2014 (2)	
Micah Parsons in his Packers uniform	Micah Parsons	Defensive end	2025	—	—	—	—	—	2025(1) (Note: KC 101 awards an offensive and defensive player of the Year award to players in the NFC and AFC; Parsons won the defensive award for the NFC.)	—	

=== Rookie of the Year ===
The NFL Rookie of the Year award is given annually to the top performing rookies from the previous season. Rookie of the year awards have been given out by UPI (starting in 1955), AP (starting in 1967), SN (starting in 1955), the NEA (starting in 1964), the PFWA (starting in 1969) and by Pepsi (starting in 2002). UPI and NEA stopped handing out their awards in 1996 and 1997, respectively. Each organization awarded varying types of awards, with some giving out individual awards to rookies from each conference, while others awarded offensive and defensive awards. Boyd Dowler was the first Packers player to win a rookie of the year award, doing so in 1959 from UPI. He was in the top 20 of all receivers in receptions, yards and receiving touchdowns that season. John Brockington was second in the NFL in rushing yards with 1,105 in 1971, earning him rookie of the year awards from UPI, AP, SN and NEA. The next season, Willie Buchanon won the AP and NEA awards, while Chester Marcol won the SN award. Buchanon had four interceptions during his rookie year, while Marcol led the league in field goal attempts and field goals made. In 1984, Tom Flynn won the PFWA Rookie of the Year Award after recording nine interceptions, the second most in the NFL that season. Eddie Lacy won three rookie of the year awards in 2013, from the AP, SN and PFWA. Lacy rushed for 1,178 yards and 11 rushing touchdowns, both in the top 10 that season. No Packers player has won the Pepsi NFL Rookie of the Year. (Note: The following players have won the Pepsi NFL Rookie of the Year, none of whom played for the Packers: 2002: Jeremy Shockey; 2003: Domanick Davis; 2004: Ben Roethlisberger; 2005: Cadillac Williams; 2006: Vince Young; 2007: Adrian Peterson; 2008: Joe Flacco; 2009: Percy Harvin; 2010: Ndamukong Suh; 2011: Cam Newton; 2012: Russell Wilson; 2013: Keenan Allen; 2014: Teddy Bridgewater; 2015: Jameis Winston; 2016: Dak Prescott; 2017: Alvin Kamara; 2018: Saquon Barkley; 2019: Nick Bosa; 2020: Justin Herbert; 2021: Ja'Marr Chase; 2022: Aidan Hutchinson; 2023: C. J. Stroud; 2024: Jayden Daniels; 2025: Tyler Shough)

Green Bay Packers players who won a rookie of the year award
Image	Player	Position	Years with Packers	Rookie of the year awards (Note: Only first-year players are eligible for rookie of the year awards, thus a player can only win each award once.)					Refs.
Image	Player	Position	Years with Packers	UPI	AP (OFF & DEF)	SN	NEA (Bert Bell Memorial Trophy)	PFWA (OFF & DEF)	Refs.
Playing card with a photo of Dowler in uniform kneeling.	Boyd Dowler	Wide receiver	1959–1969	1959	—	—	—	—	
	John Brockington	Running back	1971–1977	1971 (Note: Starting in 1970, UPI awarded a rookie of the year award to one player in each conference; Brockington won the NFC award.)	1971 (Note: AP awards a rookie of the year award to an offensive and defensive player each year; Buchanon won the offensive award.)	1971 (Note: From 1970 to 1979, SN awarded a rookie of the year award to one player in each conference; Brockington won the NFC award.)	1971 (Note: Brockington won the NEA Rookie of the Year Award for the NFC.)	—	
Buchanon in a suit and tie speaking to a crowd	Willie Buchanon	Cornerback	1972–1978	—	1972 (Note: AP awards a rookie of the year award to an offensive and defensive player each year; Buchanon won the defensive award.)	—	1972 (Note: Buchanon won the NEA Rookie of the Year Award for the NFC.)	—	
	Chester Marcol	Placekicker	1972–1980	—	—	1972 (Note: From 1970 to 1979, SN awarded a rookie of the year award to one player in each conference; Marcol won the NFC award.)	—	—	
	Tom Flynn	Safety	1984–1986	—	—	—	—	1984 (Note: Flynn won the defensive rookie of the year award.)	
Lacy rushing the football in uniform	Eddie Lacy	Running back	2013–2016	—	2013 (Note: AP awards a rookie of the year award to an offensive and defensive player each year; Lacy won the offensive award.)	2013 (Note: Lacy won the overall SN Rookie of the Year Award.)	—	2013 (Note: Lacy won the overall PFWA Rookie of the Year Award.)	

=== Comeback Player of the Year ===
The NFL Comeback Player of the Year Award is given to an NFL player who overcomes some type of adversity, whether due to injury, poor performance, or not being in the league, to return to a high level of performance. Since 1962, four organizations have given out comeback player of the year awards: the AP from 1963 to 1966, and then 1998 to the present; the PFWA from 1972 to the present; UPI in 1962, 1963 and 1969; (Note: The following players have won the UPI Comeback Player of the Year Award, none of whom played for the Packers: 1962: Frank Gifford; 1963: Ed Brown; 1969: Gale Sayers) and SN from 2008 to present. Since their inception, two Packers players have won comeback player of the year awards: Robert Brooks in 1997 and Jordy Nelson in 2016. Both Brooks and Nelson won their awards after injuries to their knees in 1996 and 2015, respectively. Brooks received his award from PFWA, while Nelson received awards from PFWA, AP and SN. No Packers player has won the UPI Comeback Player of the Year Award, which was only given out three times.

Green Bay Packers players who won a comeback player of the year award
Image	Player	Position	Years with Packers	Comeback player of the year awards			Refs.
Image	Player	Position	Years with Packers	PFW/PFWA	AP	SN	Refs.
	Robert Brooks	Wide receiver	1992–1998	1997 (1)	—	—	
Nelson in uniform on the field during a game	Jordy Nelson	Wide receiver	2008–2017	2016 (1)	2016 (1)	2016 (1)	

=== Super Bowl MVP ===
The Super Bowl MVP Award is given out by the NFL to the best player in each Super Bowl. Three Packers players have won the award: Starr twice in the first two Super Bowls (I and II), Desmond Howard in Super Bowl XXXI and Rodgers in Super Bowl XLV. Starting in 2001, the awardee is selected near the end of the game by electronic fan voting, which makes up 20% of the vote tally, while the remaining 80% is chosen by a panel of sportswriters selected by the NFL. Prior to 1990, the award was sponsored by Sport magazine, who gave away a new car to the winner. After the 1990 season with Super Bowl XXV, the NFL awarded the Super Bowl MVP with the Pete Rozelle Trophy, named after the former commissioner of the NFL of the same name. Starr and Rodgers were given the award based on their exceptional passing during their respective Super Bowls. Howard became the first special teams player to win the Super Bowl MVP. Despite quarterback Brett Favre throwing for two touchdowns and rushing for another during Super Bowl XXXI, Howard was given the MVP after setting then-records for the longest kick-off return (a 99-yard kick-off return for a touchdown) and most total return yards (244) in a Super Bowl.

Green Bay Packers players who won a Super Bowl MVP award
Image	Player	Position	Years with Packers	Super Bowl (season)	Refs.
Black and white photo of Starr in uniform tossing a football	Bart Starr	Quarterback	1956–1971	Super Bowl I (1966) (1)	
Black and white photo of Starr in uniform tossing a football	Bart Starr	Quarterback	1956–1971	Super Bowl II (1967) (2)	
Howard smiling in a suit and tie	Desmond Howard	Returner	1996	Super Bowl XXXI (1996)	
Rodgers under center about to snap the football during a game	Aaron Rodgers	Quarterback	2005–2022	Super Bowl XLV (2010)	

=== Coach of the Year ===
Numerous organizations have awarded coach of the year awards, including AP, UPI, SN, PFWA, KC 101, and Maxwell. UPI and PFW discontinued their awards in 1996 and 2012, respectively. PFW's award was given in conjunction with PFWA's award from 1992 to 2012. Six Packers head coaches have won coach of the year awards: Vince Lombardi in 1959 (AP and UPI), 1961 (SN) and 1967 (PFWA); Dan Devine in 1972 (UPI, PFWA/PFW and KC 101); Lindy Infante in 1989 (AP, UPI, PFWA, KC 101 and SN); Mike Holmgren (KC 101); Mike McCarthy in 2007 (KC 101) and 2011 (Maxwell); and Matt LaFleur in 2021 (KC 101). Almost all of the Packers coaches won their awards after helping lead the team to significant improvements in their record from the season before or from achieving postseason success. Lombardi won his first coach of the year award his first season with the Packers, after the Packers achieved a record of 7–5 a season after going 1–10–1. Lombardi's second coach of the year award in 1961 came after he won his first NFL championship with the Packers, while his third award in 1967 came after winning three straight championships. Devine won his awards in 1972 after leading the Packers to the playoffs for the first time since 1967, while Infante won his awards after the Packers improved their record to 10–6 after only winning 4 games the year prior. Holmgren's award came during his first season with the Packers after increasing the team's record from 4–12 the previous season to 9–7. McCarthy's award came after the Packers won 15 games during the 2011 season, the most ever by a Packers team at the time. LaFleur became the first head coach to win 13 games three straight seasons in 2021, earning him his coach of the year award that season. No Packers coach won an award from PFW.

Green Bay Packers coaches who won a coach of the year award
Image	Coach	Title	Years with Packers	Coach of the year awards						Refs.
Image	Coach	Title	Years with Packers	AP	UPI (Note: UPI awarded a coach of the year award for the NFL from 1955 to 1969 and for the AFL from 1960 to 1969. After the AFL–NFL merger, UPI gave an award to an NFC and AFC coach. As the Packers were in the NFL and then the NFC, all UPI award winners were the NFL or NFC selections.)	SN	PFWA	KC 101 (Note: KC 101 awards a coach of the year award to one coach in the NFC and one in the AFC. As the Packers have always been in the NFC, all KC 101 award winners are the NFC winners.)	Greasy Neale Award (Maxwell)	Refs.
Portrait of Lombardi in a tuxedo	Vince Lombardi	Head coach	1959–1968	1959 (1)	1959 (1)	1961 (1)	1967 (1)	—	—	
Black and white photo of Devine standing wearing a hat	Dan Devine	Head coach	1971–1974	—	1972 (1)	—	1972 (1)	1972 (1)	—	
	Lindy Infante	Head coach	1988–1991	1989 (1)	1989 (1)	1989 (1)	1989 (1)	1989 (1)	—	
Portrait photo of Holgren.	Mike Holmgren	Head coach	1992–1998	—	—	—	1992 (1)	—	—	
McCarthy in a Packers shirt.	Mike McCarthy	Head coach	1999; 2006–2018	—	—	—	2007 (1)	—	2011 (1)	
LaFleur wearinga Packers jacket during a game	Matt LaFleur	Head coach	2019–2024	—	—	—	2021 (1)	—	—	

=== Assistant Coach of the Year ===
The NFL Assistant Coach of the Year award is presented to the best assistant coach in the NFL from the previous season. Two organizations give this award: AP and PFWA. Ray Rhodes was the inaugural winner of the PFWA award in 1993. The AP award was first given in 2014, although no Packers assistant coach has been given the award.

Green Bay Packers coaches who won an assistant coach of the year award
Image	Coach	Title	Years with Packers	Season awarded	Refs.
	Ray Rhodes	Defensive coordinator	1992–1993; 1999	1993 (1)	

=== Executive of the Year ===
The SN NFL Executive of the Year Award is given annually to the best executive, such as a general manager, from the previous season. The awardee is determined by a vote of fellow NFL executives. Two Packers executives have won a SN NFL Executive of the Year Award: Ron Wolf in 1992 and Ted Thompson in 2007 and 2011. Wolf won his award after helping the Packers go from a record of 4–12 in 1991 to a record of 9–7 in 1992. Similarly, Thompson won his first award after helping the Packers go 13–3 in 2007, a five-win improvement from the previous season. Thompson's second award, in 2011, came after the Packers went 15–1 the year after their victory in Super Bowl XLV. The PFWA has also presented an executive of the year award annually since 1993, although no Packer has won this award.

Green Bay Packers players who won an NFL Executive of the Year Award
Image	Player	Title	Years with Packers	Season awarded	Refs.
Wolf in a suit and tie	Ron Wolf	General manager	1991–2000	1992 (1)	
Thompson wearing a Packers jacket standing on a field	Ted Thompson	General manager	1992–1999; 2005–2020	2007 (1)	
Thompson wearing a Packers jacket standing on a field	Ted Thompson	General manager	1992–1999; 2005–2020	2011 (2)	

=== Butkus Award ===
The Butkus Award is given by the Butkus Foundation to the best linebacker at the high school, college and professional level. The award is named after Dick Butkus, the Pro Football Hall of Fame linebacker for the Chicago Bears in the 1960s and 1970s. The first award to a player at the professional level was in 2008. Clay Matthews III is the only Packers player to have won the award, doing so in 2010. That season, Matthews recorded 13 sacks, 18 tackles for loss, two forced fumbles and he returned an interception for a touchdown.

Green Bay Packers players who won a Butkus Award
Image	Player	Position	Years with Packers	Season awarded	Refs.
Matthews on a field during a game.	Clay Matthews III	Linebacker	2009–2018	2010 (1)	

=== Other awards ===
==== Deacon Jones Award ====
The Deacon Jones Award was created in 2013 by the NFL to recognize the league leader each year in sacks. The award is named after Pro Football Hall of Fame defensive end Deacon Jones, who unofficially led the league in sacks five separate seasons. No Packers player has led the league in sacks since it became an official statistic in 1982 and thus no Packers player has been awarded the Deacon Jones Award.

== Philanthropy, community and sportsmanship awards ==
=== NFLPA Alan Page Community Award ===
The NFLPA Alan Page Community Award is given by the NFL Players Association (NFLPA) each year who had a "profound dedication to positively impacting his team’s city and communities across the country". The award, which was first given out in 1967, is named after Hall of Famer Alan Page, who in addition to playing in the NFL, worked for the players' union and became an associate justice of the Minnesota Supreme Court. Bart Starr and Willie Davis are the only Packers players to have won the award, doing so back-to-back in 1967 and 1968; Starr was the inaugural winner.

Green Bay Packers players who won an NFLPA Alan Page Community Award
Image	Player	Position	Years with Packers	Season awarded	Refs.
Playing card with a portrait photo of Starr on it.	Bart Starr	Quarterback	1956–1971	1967 (1)	
Willie Davis playing during a game	Willie Davis	Defensive end	1960–1969	1968 (1)	

=== Bart Starr Award ===
The Bart Starr Award is given annually to an American football player in the NFL who "best exemplifies outstanding character and leadership in the home, on the field, and in the community". The award, which is named after Green Bay Packers quarterback Bart Starr and was first given out in 1989, is presented by Athletes in Action (AIA), a sports ministry associated with Cru (formerly known as Campus Crusade for Christ). It is awarded to the winner each year at the Super Bowl Breakfast, an NFL-sanctioned event that occurs the day before the Super Bowl. Aaron Rodgers is the only Packers player to have won the award, doing so in 2014.

Green Bay Packers players who won a Bart Starr Award
Image	Player	Position	Years with Packers	Year awarded	Refs.
Rodgers in a Packers uniform wearing a hat.	Aaron Rodgers	Quarterback	2005–2022	2014 (1)	

=== George Halas Award ===
The George Halas Award is given by the PFWA to an "NFL player, coach or staff member who overcomes the most adversity to succeed". The award, which was first given out in 1969, is named after Pro Football Hall of Famer George Halas, who played with, coached and owned the Chicago Bears from 1920 to 1983. Eddie Lee Ivery is the only Green Bay Packers player to have won the award, doing so in 1983.

Green Bay Packers players who won a George Halas Award
Image	Player	Position	Years with Packers	Year awarded	Refs.
Ivery rushing the football in his Packers uniform.	Eddie Lee Ivery	Running back	1979–1986	1983 (1)	

=== Other awards ===
==== Art Rooney Award ====
The Art Rooney Award, which is named in honor of the former owner of the Pittsburgh Steelers Art Rooney, is given annually by the NFL to recognize outstanding sportsmanship on the playing field. It was first given in 2014, however no Packers player has won the award.

==== Walter Payton NFL Man of the Year Award ====
The Walter Payton NFL Man of the Year Award, which is named after Pro Football Hall of Fame running back Walter Payton, is presented by the NFL each year to honor a player's commitment to philanthropy and community impact, as well as excellence on the field. The award was first given in 1970, however no Packers player has won the award.

== See also ==
- List of NFL awards
- Lists of Green Bay Packers players
