= List of Green Bay Packers team records =

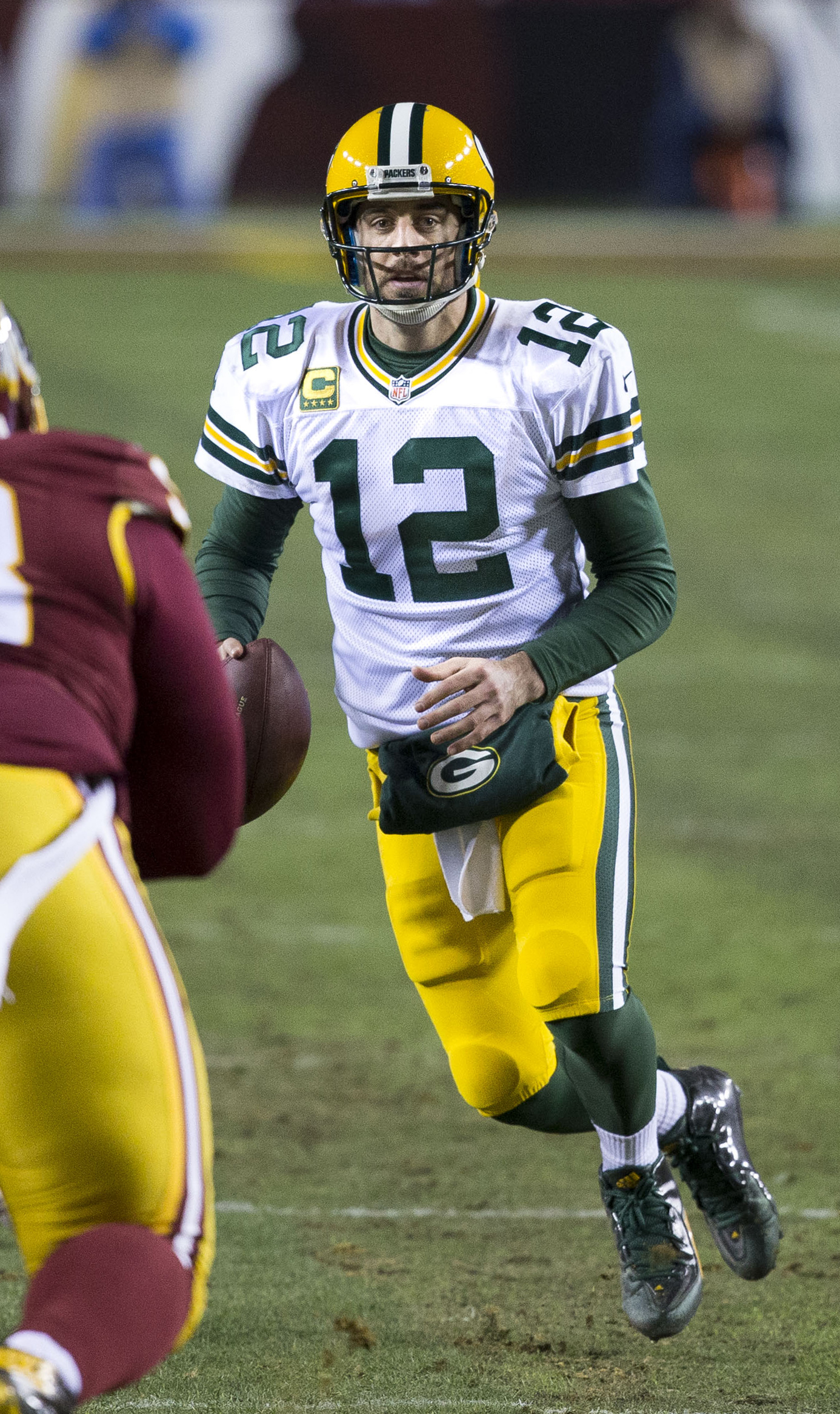
At 18 seasons on the active roster, Aaron Rodgers is the most tenured player in Packers' history.

The Green Bay Packers are a professional American football team based in Green Bay, Wisconsin. The Packers have competed in the National Football League (NFL) since 1921, two years after their original founding by Curly Lambeau and George Whitney Calhoun. They are members of the North Division of the National Football Conference (NFC) and play their home games at Lambeau Field in central Wisconsin. As one of the oldest teams in the NFL, the Packers have accumulated a significant number of records, both as a team and within the NFL. The Packers have recorded the most regular season victories (823) and the most overall victories (860) of any team, as well as the third most playoff wins (37). Since entering the NFL, the team has won 13 championships (the most in NFL history), including 9 NFL Championships prior to 1966 and 4 Super Bowls, which is inclusive of 2 additional NFL Championships won during the AFL–NFL merger. They have captured 21 divisional titles, 3 conference championships and been to the playoffs 37 times.

Individually, Packers passing statistical leaders are dominated by two quarterbacks: Brett Favre and Aaron Rodgers. Both started over 225 games each for the Packers during the modern era of football that saw a significant proliferation of the passing game. Packers rushing and receiving statistical leaders are more diverse. Don Hutson held almost every Packer and NFL receiving record at the end of his career in 1945; he still holds the Packer record for most receiving touchdowns with 99. During the 1960s, Vince Lombardi's strong rushing attack, which included the Packers sweep, saw Jim Taylor set Packer records for most career rushing attempts, rushing yards and rushing touchdowns. Ahman Green broke Taylor's record for most rushing yards 40 years later, as well as setting other single-season rushing records. Under Favre and Rodgers from 1992 to 2022, Sterling Sharpe, Donald Driver and Davante Adams set almost every Packers receiving record. Defensively, Packers statistical leaders are quite diverse, although defensive statistics are a relatively recent phenomenon. On special teams, kickers Mason Crosby, Chester Marcol and Ryan Longwell hold almost every kicking record in Packers history, while punters David Beverly and Craig Hentrich hold most punting records. Punt and kick return records are very diverse, with a number of players holding different records.

== Team achievements ==
The Green Bay Packers have accumulated the most wins of any team in NFL history (both in the regular season and combined total of regular season and postseason) and the most NFL Championships. They also own the second highest winning percentage (behind the Dallas Cowboys) and have won the second most playoff games (behind the San Francisco 49ers and tied with New England Patriots). The Packers have won three straight NFL Championships two separate times (1929 to 1931 and 1965 to 1967). They are the only NFL team to ever achieve this feat even once. The table below provides a summary of the Packers' all-time record and playoff achievements.

All statistics are accurate through the end of the 2025 NFL season.

Packers team achievements
Green Bay Packers; team achievements	NFL titles (Note: Includes pre and post merger)	Conference titles	Divisional titles (Note: All NFL Divisional titles between 1933 and the present)	Wild card berths	Playoff appearances	NFL Title Game appearances (Note: All NFL Championship Games between 1933 and 1969)	Super Bowl appearances (Note: All Super Bowls from I through LVI (1966–present))	All-time record	Ref.
Green Bay Packers; team achievements	13	9	21	3	37	11	5	861–639–39 (.572)	

== Career records ==
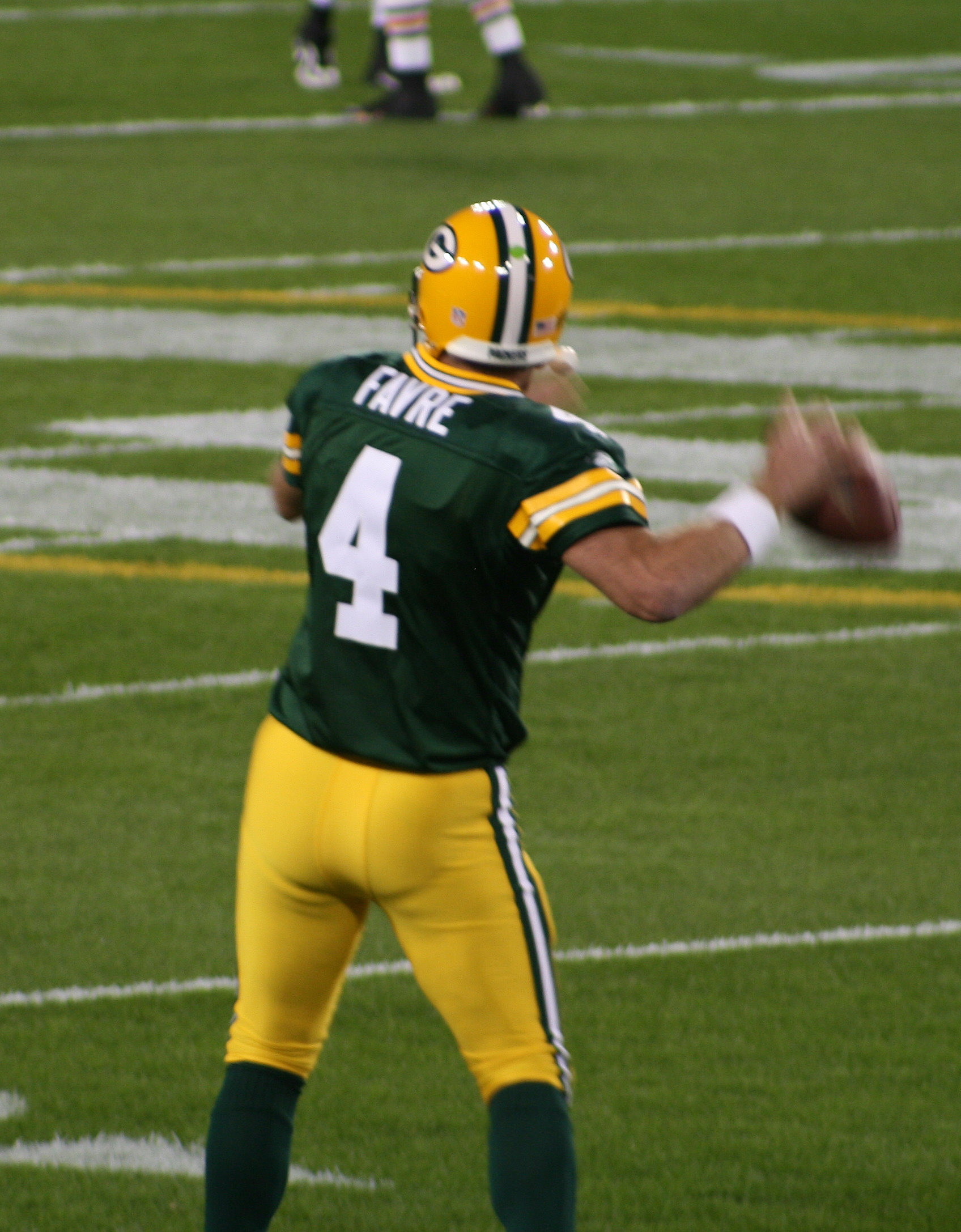
Brett Favre holds almost every career passing record for the Packers.

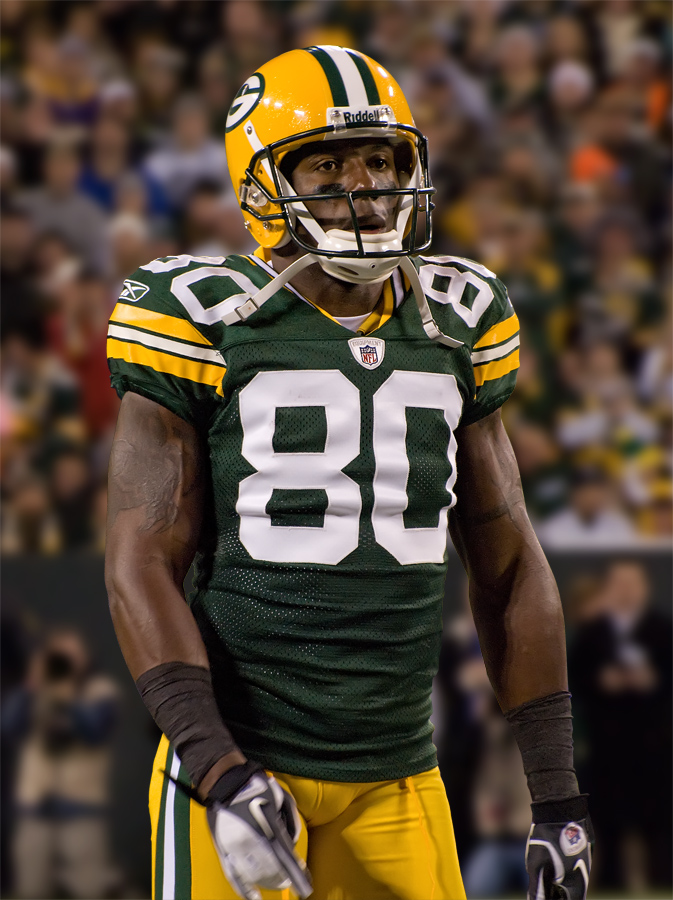
Donald Driver holds the Packers record for most career receptions and receiving yards.

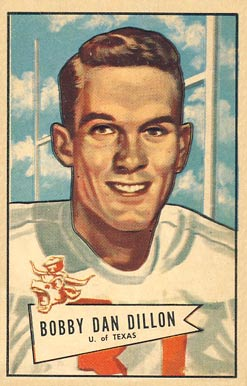
Bobby Dillon has held the Packers' record for most interceptions in a career since 1959.

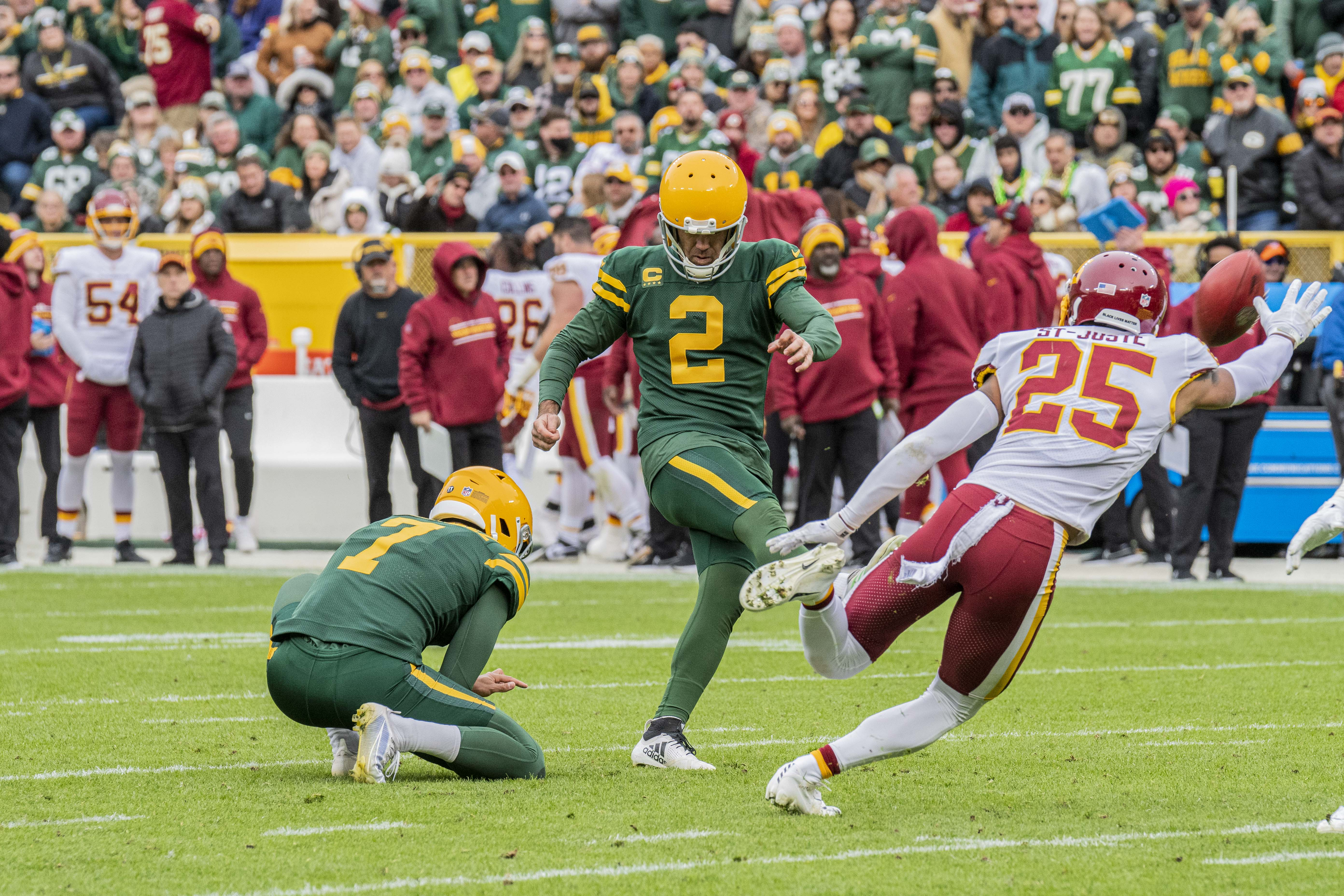
Mason Crosby (uniform #2) scored the most points of any Packers' player, while also holding most career kicking records.

All statistics are accurate through the end of the 2025 NFL season.

=== Service ===
- Seasons, head coach: 31 – Curly Lambeau (1919–46)
- Seasons, active player: 18 – Aaron Rodgers (2005–2022)
- Games played: 258 – Mason Crosby (2007–2022)
- Consecutive games played: 258 – Mason Crosby (2007–2022)

=== Scoring ===
- Points: 1,918 – Mason Crosby (2007–2022)
- Points per game: 7.4 – Mason Crosby (2007–2022)

=== Offense ===
==== Passing ====
- Completions: 5,377 – Brett Favre (1992–2007)
- Attempts: 8,754 – Brett Favre (1992–2007)
- Yards: 61,655 – Brett Favre (1992–2007)
- Touchdowns: 475 – Aaron Rodgers (2005–2022)
- Interceptions: 286 – Brett Favre (1992–2007)
- Passer rating: (Note: Minimum 1,500 pass attempts to qualify) 103.6 – Aaron Rodgers (2005–2022)

==== Rushing ====
- Attempts: 1,851 – Ahman Green (2000–2006)
- Yards: 8,322 – Ahman Green (2000–2006)
- Yards per rush: (Note: Minimum 750 rush attempts to qualify) 5.0 – Aaron Jones (2017–2023)
- Touchdowns: 81 – Jim Taylor (1958–1966)

==== Receiving ====
- Receptions: 743 – Donald Driver (1999–2012)
- Yards: 10,137 – Donald Driver (1999–2012)
- Yards per reception: (Note: Minimum 200 receptions to qualify) 19.7 – Carroll Dale (1965–1972)
- Touchdowns: 99 – Don Hutson (1935–1945)

=== Defense ===
==== Tackles ====
- Tackles: (Note: Career tackles only tracked from 1975 onwards) 1,118 – A. J. Hawk (2006–2014)

==== Sacks ====
- Sacks: (Note: These records do not include unofficial totals compiled prior to 1982, when sacks became an official statistic.) 83.5 – Clay Matthews III (2009–2018)

==== Interceptions ====
- Interceptions: 52 – Bobby Dillon (1952–1959)
- Interception return yards: 976 – Bobby Dillon (1952–1959)
- Interceptions returned for a touchdown: 9 – Charles Woodson (2006–2012)

=== Special teams ===
==== Punting ====
- Punts: 495 – David Beverly (1975–1980)
- Punt yards: 18,785 – David Beverly (1975–1980)
- Yards per punt (gross): (Note: Minimum 250 career punts to qualify) 44.2 – Tim Masthay (2010–2015)
- Yards per punt (net): 38.7 – Tim Masthay (2010–2015)

==== Kicking ====
- Field goals made: 395 – Mason Crosby (2007–2022)
- Field goal attempts: 485 – Mason Crosby (2007–2022)
- Field goal percentage: (Note: Minimum 100 field goal attempts to qualify) 81.59% – Ryan Longwell (1997–2005)
- Extra points made: 733 – Mason Crosby (2007–2022)
- Extra point attempts: 753 – Mason Crosby (2007–2022)

==== Punt returns ====
- Returns: 187 – Willie Wood (1960–1971)
- Return yards: 1,391 – Willie Wood (1960–1971)
- Yards per return: (Note: Minimum 75 punt returns to qualify) 20.5 – Jeremy Ross (2012–2013)
- Touchdowns: 3 – Desmond Howard (1996) & Micah Hyde (2013–2016)

==== Kick returns ====
- Returns: 179 – Steve Odom (1974–1979)
- Return yards: 4,124 – Steve Odom (1974–1979)
- Yards per return: (Note: Minimum 75 kick returns to qualify) 30.3 – Chuck Sample (1942–1945)
- Touchdowns: 5 – Travis Williams (1967–1970)

== Single-season records ==
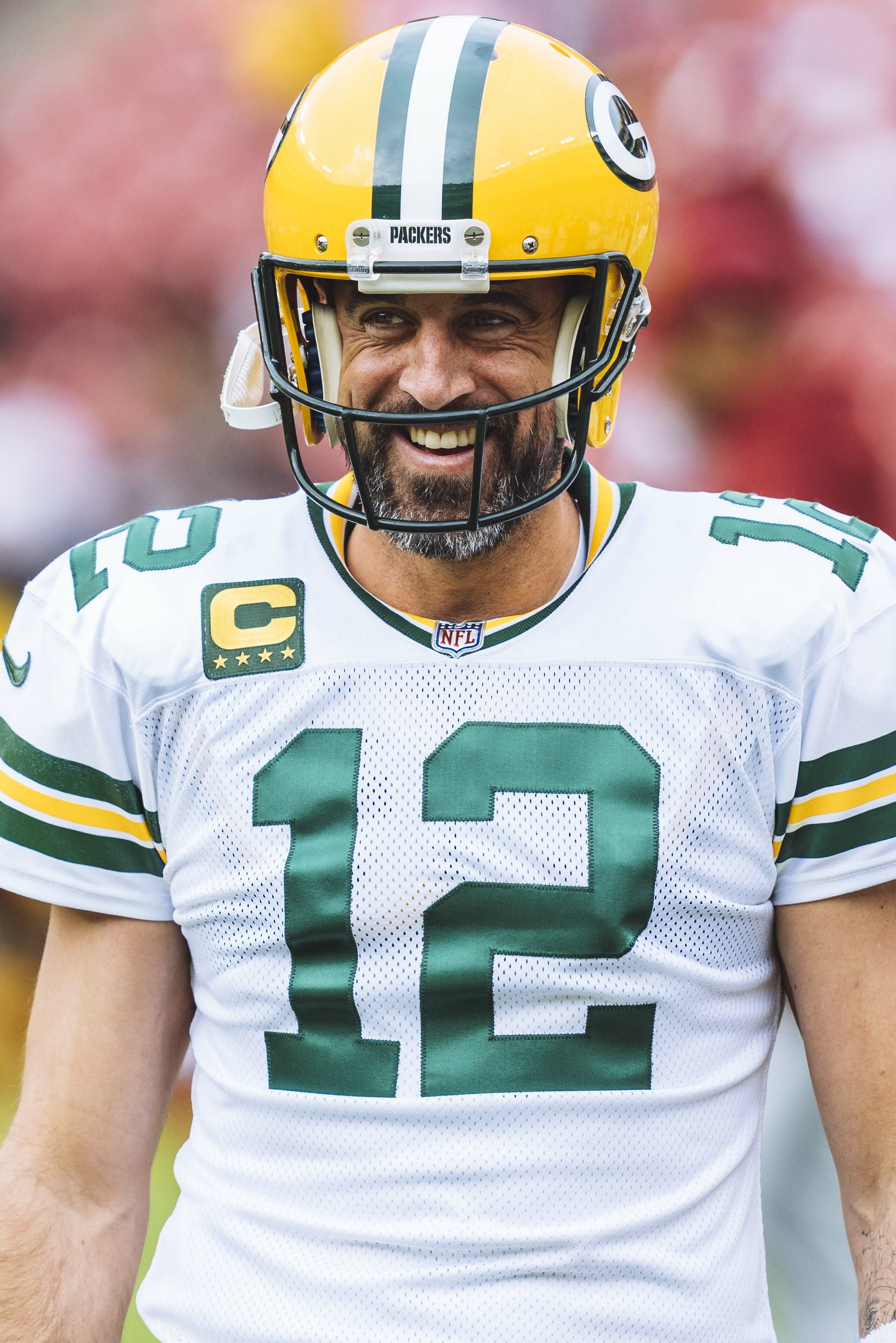
Aaron Rodgers holds a number of single-season passing records for the Packers, including completions, yards and touchdowns.

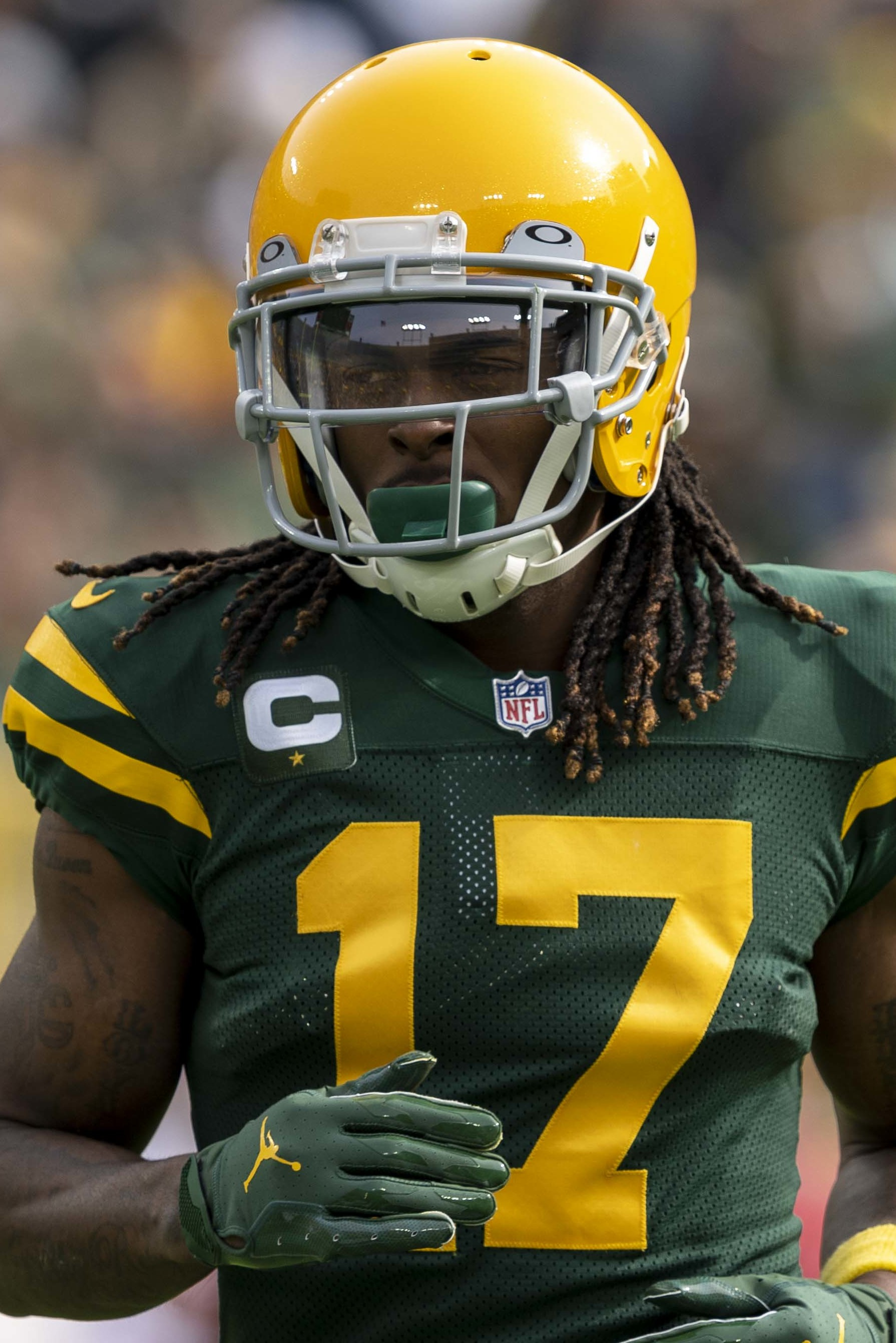
Davante Adams set the Packers' single-season receiving records for completions, yards and touchdowns over a two-season period.

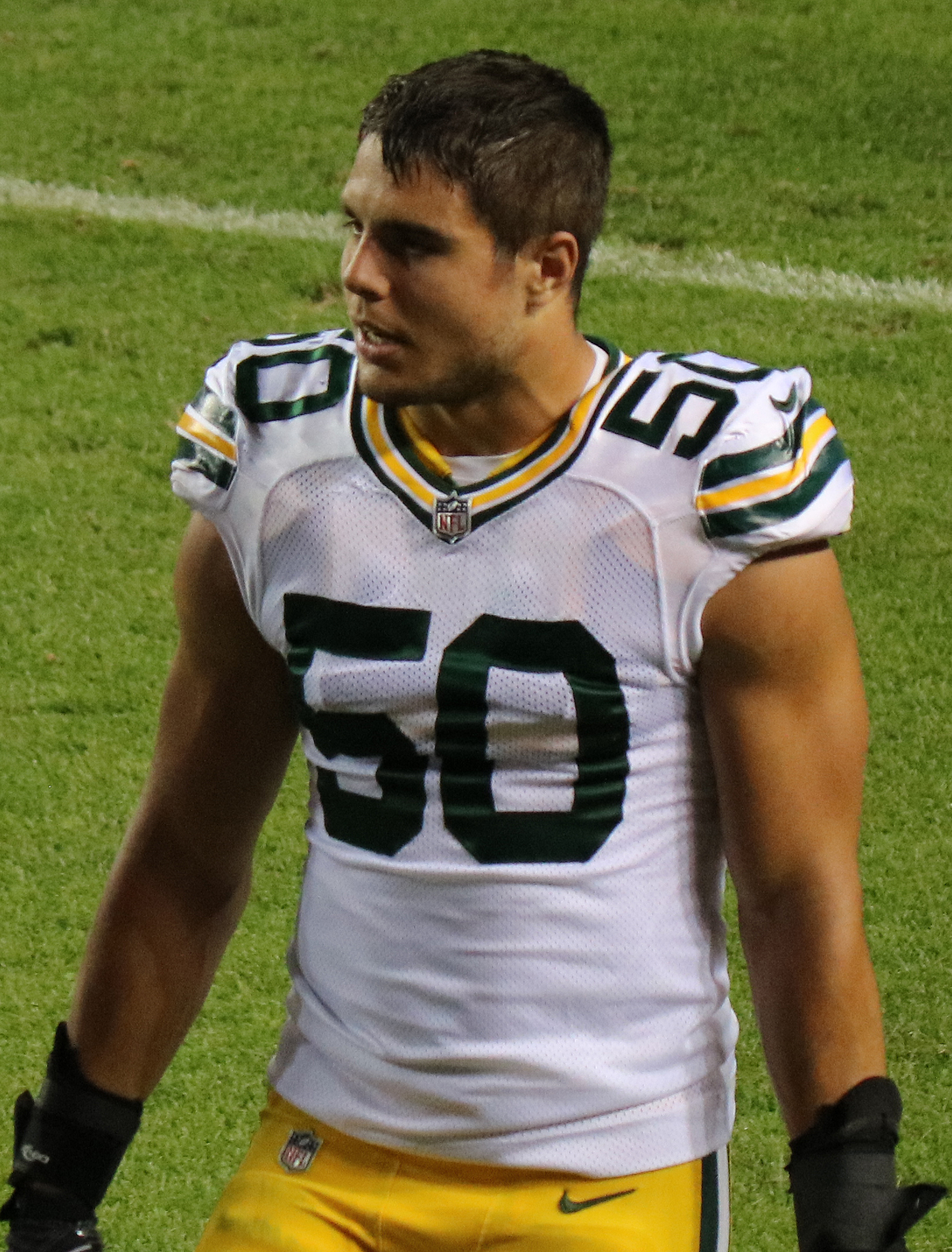
Blake Martinez set the Packers' single-season record for most tackles in 2019 with 203.

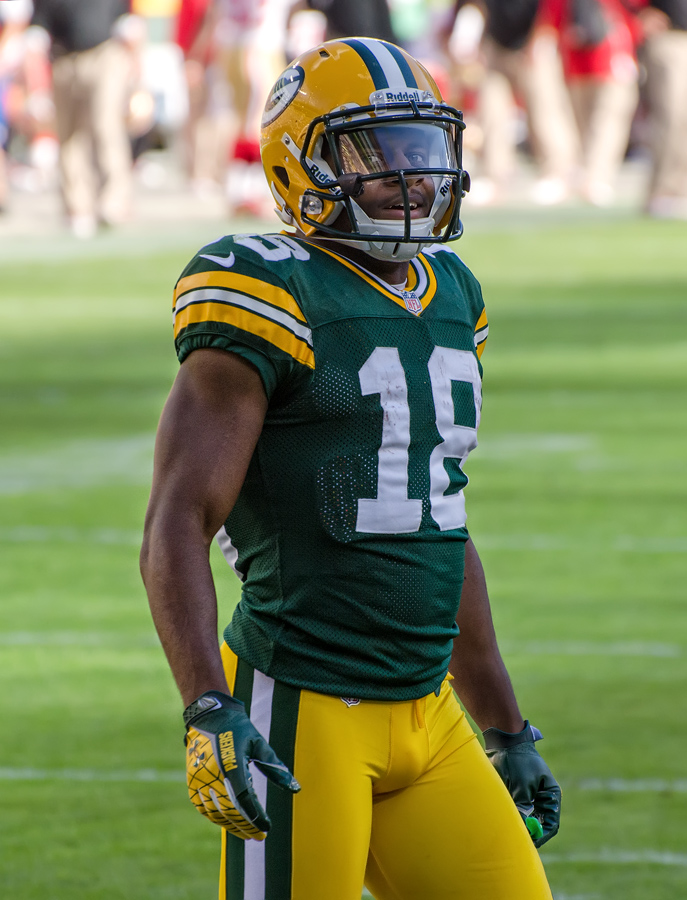
Randall Cobb set the record for the longest kick return at 108 yards in the first game of his NFL career.

All statistics are accurate through the end of the 2025 NFL season.

=== Scoring ===
- Points: 176 – Paul Hornung (1960)
- Points per game: 14.7 – Paul Hornung (1960)

=== Offense ===
==== Passing ====
- Completions: 401 – Aaron Rodgers (2016)
- Attempts: 613 – Brett Favre (2006)
- Yards: 4,643 – Aaron Rodgers (2011)
- Longest pass: 99 yards^{(NFL record)} – Brett Favre (1995)
- Touchdowns: 48 – Aaron Rodgers (2020)
- Interceptions: 29 – Lynn Dickey (1983) & Brett Favre (2005)
- Passer rating: (Note: Minimum 14 pass attempts per team game to qualify) 122.5^{(NFL record)} – Aaron Rodgers (2011)

==== Rushing ====
- Attempts: 355 – Ahman Green (2003)
- Yards: 1,883 – Ahman Green (2003)
- Longest rush: 98 yards – Ahman Green (2003)
- Touchdowns: 19 – Jim Taylor (1962)

==== Receiving ====
- Receptions: 117 – Davante Adams (2021)
- Yards: 1,553 – Davante Adams (2021)
- Longest reception: 99 yards^{(NFL record)} – Robert Brooks (1995)
- Touchdowns: 18 – Sterling Sharpe (1994) & Davante Adams (2020)

=== Defense ===
==== Tackles ====
- Tackles: 203 – Blake Martinez (2019)

==== Sacks ====
- Sacks: 19.5 – Tim Harris (1989)

==== Interceptions ====
- Interceptions: 10 – Irv Comp (1943)
- Interception return yards: 295 – Nick Collins (2008)
- Interceptions returned for a touchdown: 3 – Herb Adderley (1965), Nick Collins (2008) & Charles Woodson (2009)

=== Special teams ===
==== Punting ====
- Punts: 106 – David Beverly (1978)
- Punt yards: 3,759 – David Beverly (1978)
- Longest punt: 90 yards – Don Chandler (1965)
- Yards per punt (gross): (Note: Minimum 1 attempt per game to qualify) 51.7 – Daniel Whelan (2025)
- Yards per punt (net): 43.0 – Daniel Whelan (2025)

==== Kicking ====
- Field goals made: 33 – Chester Marcol (1972), Ryan Longwell (2000) & Mason Crosby (2013)
- Field goal attempts: 48 – Chester Marcol (1972)
- Field goal percentage: (Note: Minimum 0.75 attempts per game to qualify) 91.67% (22/24) – Jan Stenerud (1981) & Mason Crosby (2019)
- Longest field goal: 61 yards – Lucas Havrisik (2025)
- Extra points made: 68 – Mason Crosby (2011)
- Extra point attempts: 69 – Mason Crosby (2011)

==== Punt returns ====
- Returns: 58 – Desmond Howard (1996)
- Return yards: 875^{(NFL record)} – Desmond Howard (1996)
- Yards per return: (Note: Minimum 1.25 punt returns per game to qualify) 19.1 Billy Grimes (1950)
- Longest return: 95 yards – Steve Odom (1974)
- Touchdowns: 3 – Desmond Howard (1996)

==== Kick returns ====
- Returns: 57 – Roell Preston (1998)
- Return yards: 1,497 – Roell Preston (1998)
- Yards per return: (Note: Minimum 1 kick return per game to qualify) 41.1^{(NFL record)} – Travis Williams (1967)
- Longest return: 108 yards – Randall Cobb (2011)
- Touchdowns: 4^{(NFL record)} – Travis Williams (1967)

== Single-game records ==
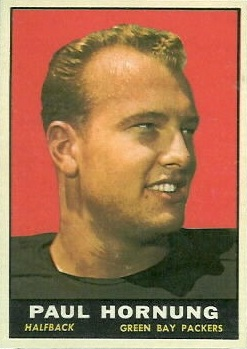
Paul Hornung scored 33 points in one game in 1965, a Packers' record.

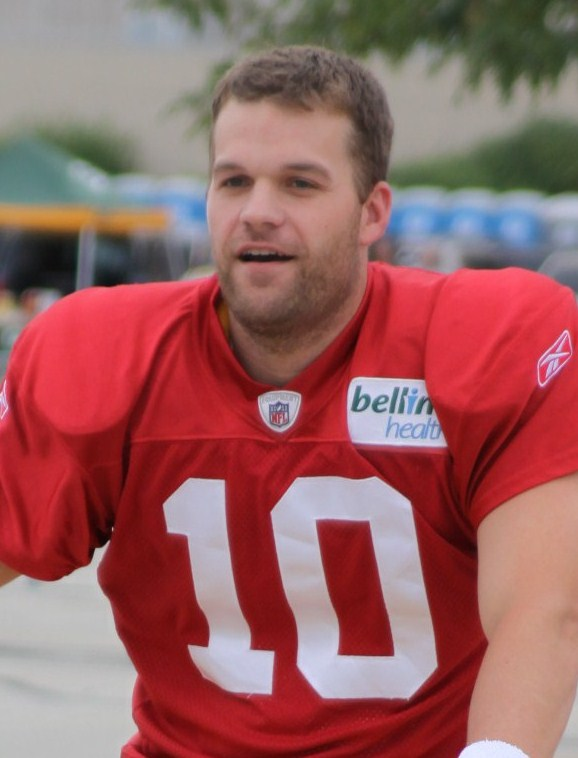
Matt Flynn tied the Packers' record for most single-game passing yards (480) and touchdowns (6) in the same game in 2012.

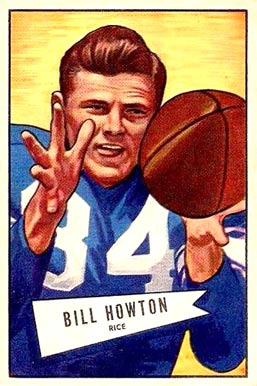
Billy Howton had 257 receiving yards in a 1956 game, the Packers' record for a single-game.

All statistics are accurate through the end of the 2025 NFL season.

=== Scoring ===
- Points, full game: 33 – Paul Hornung (1965)
- Points, single quarter: 29^{(NFL record)} – Don Hutson (1945)

=== Offense ===
==== Passing ====
- Completions: 39 – Aaron Rodgers (2016)
- Attempts: 61 – Brett Favre (1996) & Aaron Rodgers (2015)
- Yards: 480 – Matt Flynn (2012) & Aaron Rodgers (2013)
- Touchdowns: 6 – Matt Flynn (2012) & Aaron Rodgers (2012 & 2014)
- Interceptions: 6 – Tom O'Malley (1950)
- Quarterback rating: (Note: Minimum 20 pass attempts to qualify) 158.3^{(NFL record)} – Aaron Rodgers (2019)

==== Rushing ====
- Attempts: 39 – Terdell Middleton (1978)
- Yards: 218 – Ahman Green (2003)
- Yards per rush: (Note: Minimum 10 rushing attempts to qualify) 16.7 – Billy Grimes (1950)
- Touchdowns: 4 – Jim Taylor (1961 & 1962), Terdell Middleton (1978), Dorsey Levens (2000) & Aaron Jones (2019 & 2021)

==== Receiving ====
- Receptions: 14 – Don Hutson (1942) & Davante Adams (2020)
- Yards: 257 – Billy Howton (1956)
- Yards per reception: (Note: Minimum 3 receptions to qualify) 49.67 – Don Hutson (1939)
- Touchdowns: 4 – Don Hutson (1945) & Sterling Sharpe (1993 & 1994)

=== Defense ===
==== Tackles ====
- Tackles: 19 – Quay Walker (2023) (Note: Record since at least 2000)

==== Sacks ====
- Sacks: 5.0 – Vonnie Holliday (2002)

==== Interceptions ====
- Interceptions: 4^{(NFL record)} – Bobby Dillon (1953) & Willie Buchanon (1978)
- Interception return yards: 116 – Charlie Peprah (2011)
- Interceptions returned for a touchdown: 1 – Several players [last: Jaire Alexander (2024)]

=== Special teams ===
==== Punting ====
- Punts: 11 – Clarke Hinkle (1933) & Jug Girard (1950)
- Yards per punt (gross): (Note: Minimum 4 punts to qualify) 61.6 – Roy McKay (1945)
- Yards per punt (net): 49.0 – Jon Ryan (2007)

==== Kicking ====
- Field goals made: 5 – Chris Jacke (1990 & 1996), Ryan Longwell (2000) & Mason Crosby (2013, 2015 & 2018)
- Field goal attempts: 7 – Mason Crosby (2021)
- Extra points made: 8 – Don Chandler (1966)
- Extra points attempted: 8 – Don Hutson (1945) & Don Chandler (1966)

==== Punt returns ====
- Returns: 8 – Phil Epps (1982)
- Return yards: 167 – Desmond Howard (1996)
- Yards per return: (Note: Minimum 3 punt returns to qualify) 37.0 – Mark Lee (1981)
- Returns for a touchdown: 1 – Several players [last: Micah Hyde (2014)]

==== Kick returns ====
- Returns: 8 – Harlan Huckleby (1983), Gary Ellerson (1985), Roell Preston (1998), Antonio Chatman (2004) & Will Blackmon (2008)
- Return yards: 256 – Roell Preston (1998)
- Yards per return: (Note: Minimum 3 kick returns to qualify) 50.33 – Travis Williams (1967)
- Returns for a touchdown: 2^{(NFL record)} – Travis Williams (1967)

== Other notable records ==
Don Hutson set numerous NFL records in the 1940s that still stand today.

All statistics are accurate through the end of the 2025 NFL season.

=== Service ===
- Most consecutive starts by an NFL quarterback: 253 (275 counting the postseason)^{(NFL record)} (Note: Favre set the NFL record for consecutive starts by a quarterback while with the Packers and continued his streak with the New York Jets and Minnesota Vikings from 2008 to 2010 to the NFL record 297 straight games (321 counting the postseason).) – Brett Favre (1992–2007)

=== Offense ===
- Most seasons leading league in lowest interception percentage: 6^{(NFL record)} – Aaron Rodgers (2009, 2014, 2018–2021)
- Most consecutive passes without an interception: 402^{(NFL record)} – Aaron Rodgers (2018)
- Lowest interception percentage, career: (Note: Minimum 1,500 passing attempts to qualify) 1.37%^{(NFL record)} – Aaron Rodgers (2005–2022)
- Lowest interception percentage, season: (Note: Minimum 200 passing attempts to qualify) 0.34%^{(NFL record)} – Aaron Rodgers (2018)
- Most passes intercepted, playoff game: 6^{(NFL record)} – Brett Favre (2002)
- Most seasons leading league in scoring: 5^{(NFL record)} – Don Hutson (1940–1944)
- Most seasons leading league in total touchdowns: 8^{(NFL record)} – Don Hutson (1935–1938, 1941–1944)
  - Most consecutive seasons leading league in total touchdowns: 4^{(NFL record)} – Don Hutson (twice: 1935–1938, 1941–1944)
- Most seasons leading league in receptions: 8^{(NFL record)} – Don Hutson (1936–1937, 1939, 1941–1945)
  - Most consecutive seasons leading league in receptions: 5^{(NFL record)} – Don Hutson (1941–1945)
- Most seasons leading league in receiving yards: 7^{(NFL record)} – Don Hutson (1936–1937, 1939, 1941–1944)
  - Most consecutive seasons leading league in receiving yards: 4^{(NFL record)} – Don Hutson (1941–1944)
- Most seasons leading league in receiving touchdowns: 9^{(NFL record)} – Don Hutson (1935–1938, 1940–1944)
  - Most consecutive seasons leading league in receiving touchdowns: 5^{(NFL record)} – Don Hutson (1940–1944)
- Most touchdown receptions, playoff game: 3^{(NFL record)} – Sterling Sharpe (1994

=== Defense ===
- Longest interception return, playoff game: 101 yards^{(NFL record)} – George Teague
- Most safeties, season: 2^{(NFL record)} – Tim Harris (1988)

=== Special teams ===
- Most consecutive field goals made, playoffs: 23^{(NFL record)} – Mason Crosby (2010–2016)
- Most field goals made, playoff game: 5^{(NFL record)} – Mason Crosby (2015)
- Most kicks blocked, season: 7^{(NFL record)} – Ted Hendricks (1974)

== See also ==
- Lists of Green Bay Packers players
