= Lists of Green Bay Packers players =

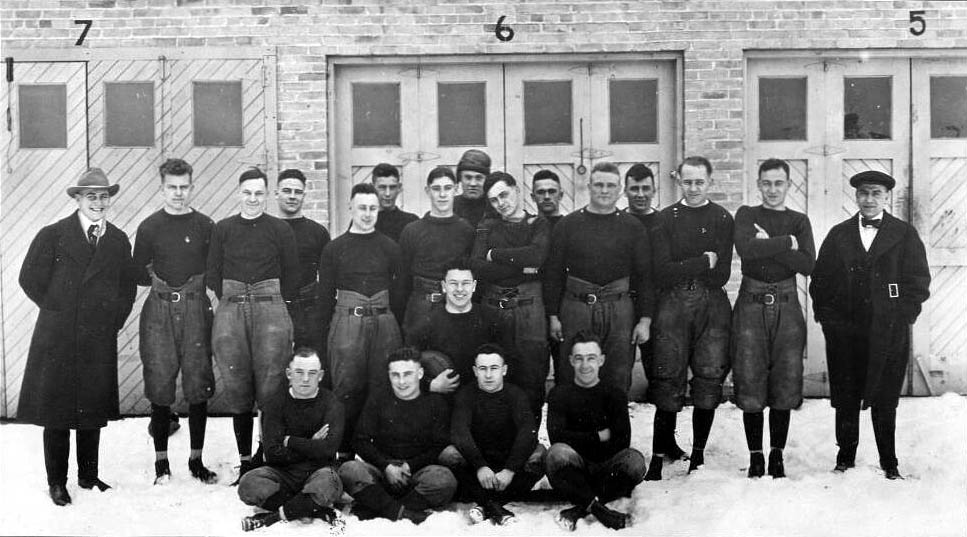
The 1919 team, shown here, comprised the first Green Bay Packers players and included founder, head coach and player Curly Lambeau.

The Green Bay Packers are a professional American football team based in Green Bay, Wisconsin. The Packers have competed in the National Football League (NFL) since 1921, two years after their original founding by Curly Lambeau and George Whitney Calhoun. They are members of the North Division of the National Football Conference (NFC) and play their home games at Lambeau Field in central Wisconsin. Since their founding, over 1,800 players have played at least one game for the team. Many, but not all of these players were selected by the Packers in the NFL draft, which began in 1936. To honor their contributions to the team, the Packers have recognized their own players in various ways, including retiring uniform numbers, establishing a team hall of fame, and documenting the team's all-time statistical leaders. Additionally, Packers players have been recognized nationally for their performance, most notably through induction into the Pro Football Hall of Fame. Packers players have also won numerous national awards, been named AP All-Pros, been selected for the Pro Bowl, and named to numerous "All-Time Teams". The following lists provide an overview of notable groupings of Green Bay Packers players.

== Current and all-time rosters ==
- Current roster – the team's active roster and practice squad, typically composed of 53 and 16 players, respectively.

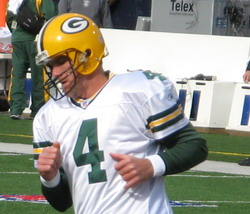
Brett Favre started the most games at quarterback for the Packers.

- All-time roster – the team's all-time roster, composed of any player who has participated in at least one regular season or postseason game (preseason games do not apply).
  - Starting quarterbacks – a list of quarterbacks who have started at least one game for the team since 1950.

== Draft choices ==
- Draft history – overview of every draft the team has participated in since the inaugural draft in 1936.
  - Draft picks (1936–1969) – a list of every draft selection by the team from 1936 to 1969.
  - Draft picks (1970–present) – a list of every draft selection by the team from 1970 to the present.
  - First-round draft picks – a list of every first-round draft selection by the team.

== Team recognition ==
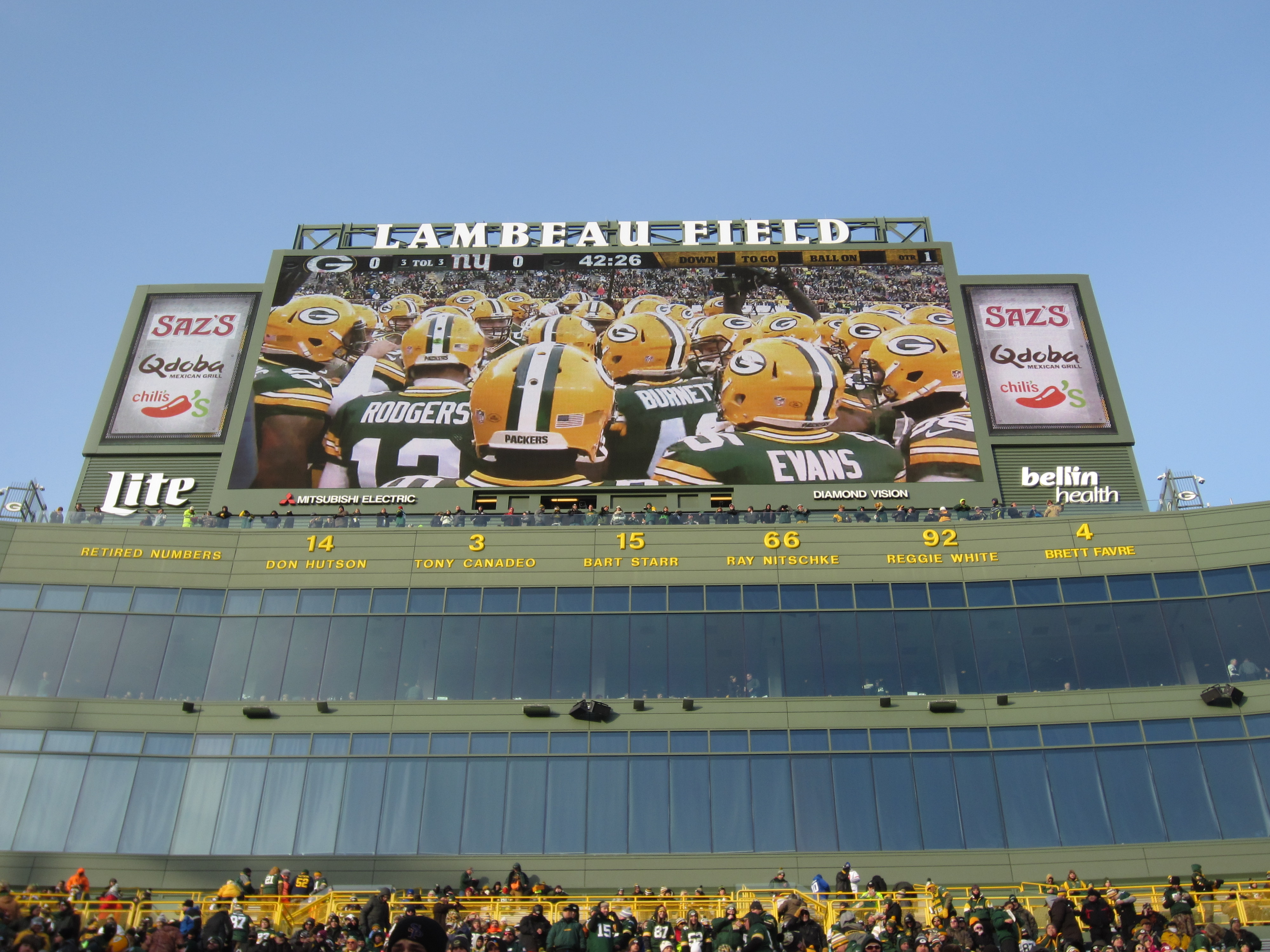
Lambeau Field's north end zone with the six Packers' retired numbers.

- Retired numbers – a list of every uniform number retired by the team.
- Team Hall of Fame – the team's hall of fame, which includes a list of all inductees.
- Team records – the team's statistical leaders and league records.

== League recognition ==
- Players in the Pro Football Hall of Fame – a list of inductees into the Pro Football Hall of Fame who played for the team.
- Award winners – a list of recipients of various national awards such as the NFL MVP Award and Super Bowl MVP while on the team.
- AP All-Pro selections – a list of players selected as an Associated Press All-Pro while on the team.
- Pro Bowl selections – a list of players selected to the Pro Bowl while on the team.
- NFL Anniversary All-Time Team selections – a list of players who were part of the team and selected for the 50th, 75th, or 100th Anniversary Teams.
- NFL All-Decade Team selections – a list of players who were part of the team and selected for an NFL All-Decade Team.
- NFL All-Rookie Team selections – a list of players who were selected for a PFWA NFL All-Rookie Team while on the team.

== See also ==
- Category:Green Bay Packers players
- Lists of American football players
