= List of Green Bay Packers NFL All-Rookie Team selections =

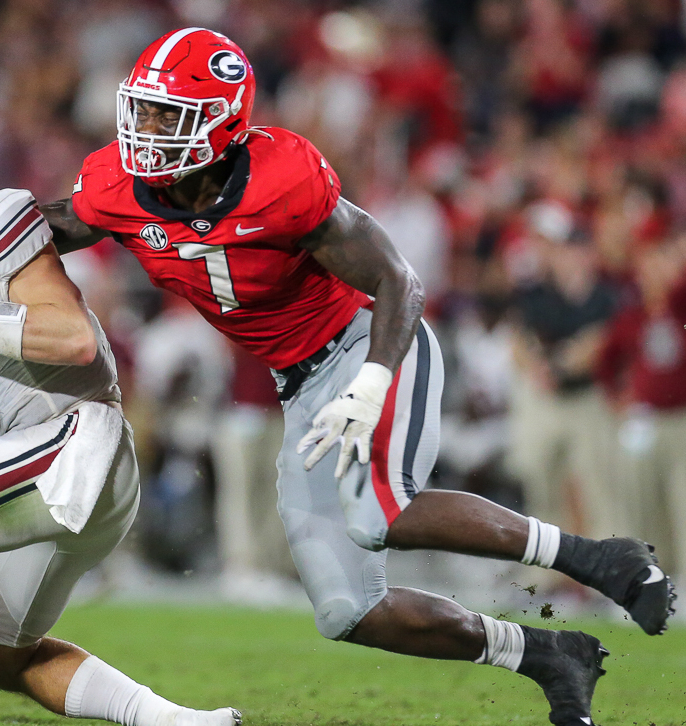
Quay Walker, a rookie out of Georgia, was selected for the NFL All-Rookie Team after the 2022 NFL season.

The Green Bay Packers are a professional American football team based in Green Bay, Wisconsin. The Packers have competed in the National Football League (NFL) since 1921, two years after their original founding by Curly Lambeau and George Whitney Calhoun. They are members of the North Division of the National Football Conference (NFC) and play their home games at Lambeau Field in central Wisconsin.

In 1974, Pro Football Writers of America (PFWA) began compiling an annual NFL All-Rookie Team made up of the best rookies at each position for the preceding season. The teams are selected by the sportswriters that make up the PFWA. For only one NFL All-Rookie Team, in 1976, the PFWA selected a first-team and second-team; all other teams do not have a distinction. From 1992 to 2012, the All-Rookie Teams were chosen jointly by PFWA and Pro Football Weekly.

The Packers have had 35 players named to 26 NFL All-Rookie Teams. No Packers were selected in the inaugural NFL All-Rookie Team in 1974; Johnnie Gray became the Packers' first selection after the 1975 NFL season. The most Packers named to one team came in 2006, when the trio of Greg Jennings, Daryn Colledge and A. J. Hawk were selected. On seven other occasions, two Packers have been selected to one team. Twice, the Packers have had an All-Rookie Team selection also given an NFL Rookie of the Year Award: Tom Flynn in 1984 and Eddie Lacy in 2013. Six All-Rookie Team selections have gone on to be inducted into the Green Bay Packers Hall of Fame, with one of those—James Lofton—also inducted into the Pro Football Hall of Fame. The most recent All-Rookie Team selections for the Packers were Edgerrin Cooper and Evan Williams after the 2024 NFL season.

== Team selections ==
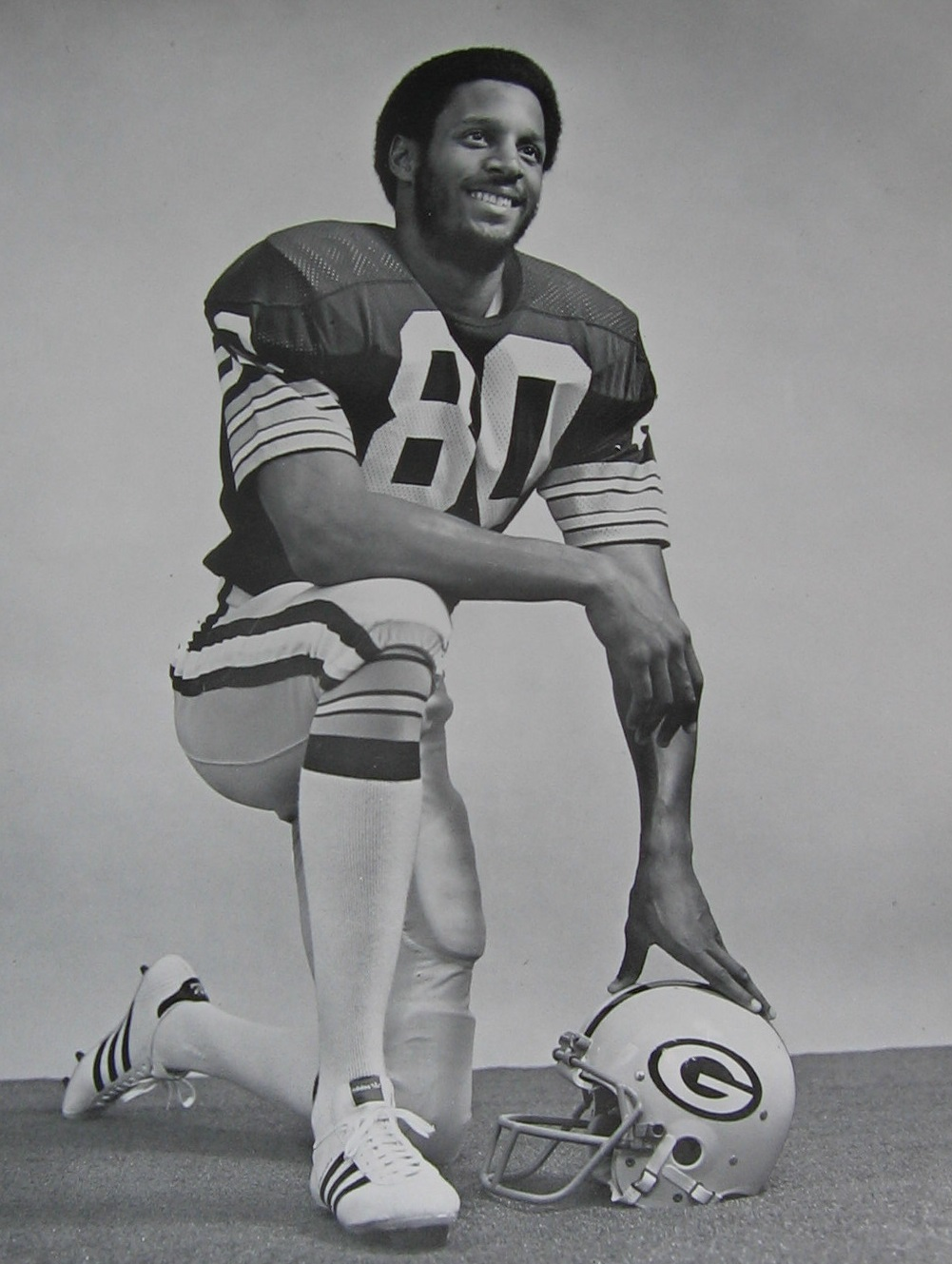
James Lofton is the only Packer selected to an All-Rookie Team who went on to be inducted into the Pro Football Hall of Fame.

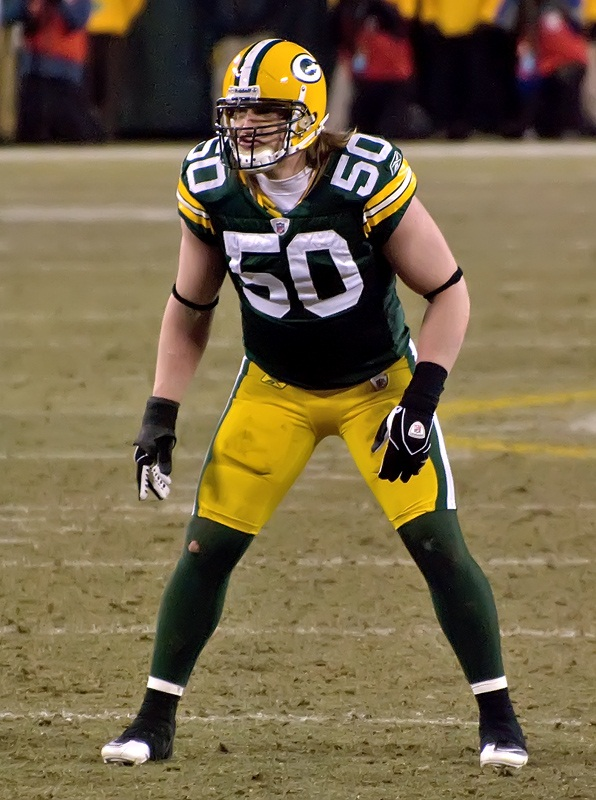
A. J. Hawk was one of three selections for the 2006 All-Rookie Team, the only time three Packers have been selected to one team.

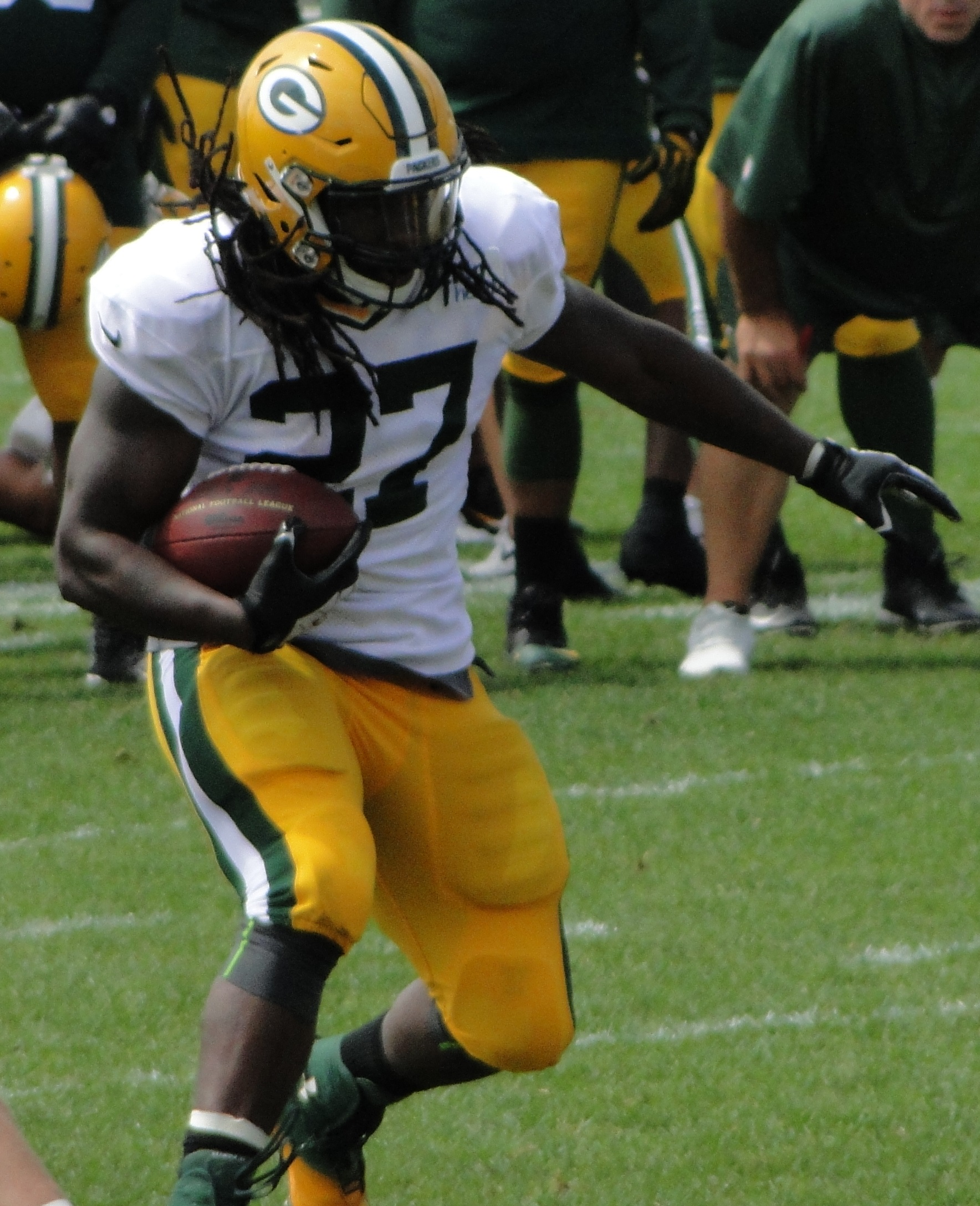
In addition to being selected to the All-Rookie Team, Eddie Lacy was named NFL Rookie of the Year in 2013.

Key
^{#}	Inducted into the Green Bay Packers Hall of Fame
‡	Inducted into the Green Bay Packers Hall of Fame and Pro Football Hall of Fame
^{(ROY)}	NFL Rookie of the Year

Green Bay Packers All-Rookie Team selections
All-Rookie Team	# of Packers selected	Name	Position	Seasons with Packers	Ref
1975	1	Johnnie Gray ^{#}	Safety	1975–1983	
1976	1	Mark Koncar	Tackle	1976–1981	
1977	1	Mike Butler	Defensive end	1977–1982	
1978	2	John Anderson ^{#}	Linebacker	1978–1989	
1978	2	James Lofton ‡	Wide receiver	1978–1986	
1984	2	Alphonso Carreker	Defensive end	1984–1989	
1984	2	Tom Flynn ^{(ROY)}	Safety	1985–1986	
1985	1	Brian Noble	Linebacker	1985–1993	
1987	1	Frankie Neal	Wide receiver	1987	
1989	1	Chris Jacke ^{#}	Placekicker	1989–1996	
1993	2	Wayne Simmons	Linebacker	1993–1997	
1993	2	George Teague	Safety	1993–1995	
1996	1	John Michels	Tackle	1996–1998	
1997	1	Ross Verba	Guard	1997–2000	
1998	1	Vonnie Holliday	Defensive end	1998–2002	
2000	1	Na'il Diggs	Linebacker	2000–2005	
2003	1	Nick Barnett	Linebacker	2003–2010	
2005	1	Nick Collins ^{#}	Safety	2005–2011	
2006	3	Daryn Colledge	Guard	2006–2010	
2006	3	A. J. Hawk	Linebacker	2006–2014	
2006	3	Greg Jennings ^{#}	Wide receiver	2006–2012	
2009	2	Clay Matthews III	Linebacker	2009–2018	
2009	2	B. J. Raji	Defensive tackle	2009–2015	
2010	1	Bryan Bulaga	Tackle	2010–2019	
2011	1	Randall Cobb	Wide receiver	2011–2018	
2012	1	Casey Hayward	Cornerback	2012–2015	
2013	1	Eddie Lacy ^{(ROY)}	Running back	2013–2016	
2014	2	Ha Ha Clinton-Dix	Safety	2014–2018	
2014	2	Corey Linsley	Center	2014–2020	
2018	1	Jaire Alexander	Cornerback	2018–2024	
2019	2	Elgton Jenkins	Guard	2019–present	
2019	2	Darnell Savage	Safety	2019–2023	
2022	1	Quay Walker	Linebacker	2022–present	
2024	2	Edgerrin Cooper	Linebacker	2024–present	
2024	2	Evan Williams	Safety	2024–present	

== See also ==
- Lists of Green Bay Packers players
- NFL Rookie of the Year Award
