= List of Green Bay Packers retired numbers =

Green Bay Packers retired jersey numbers

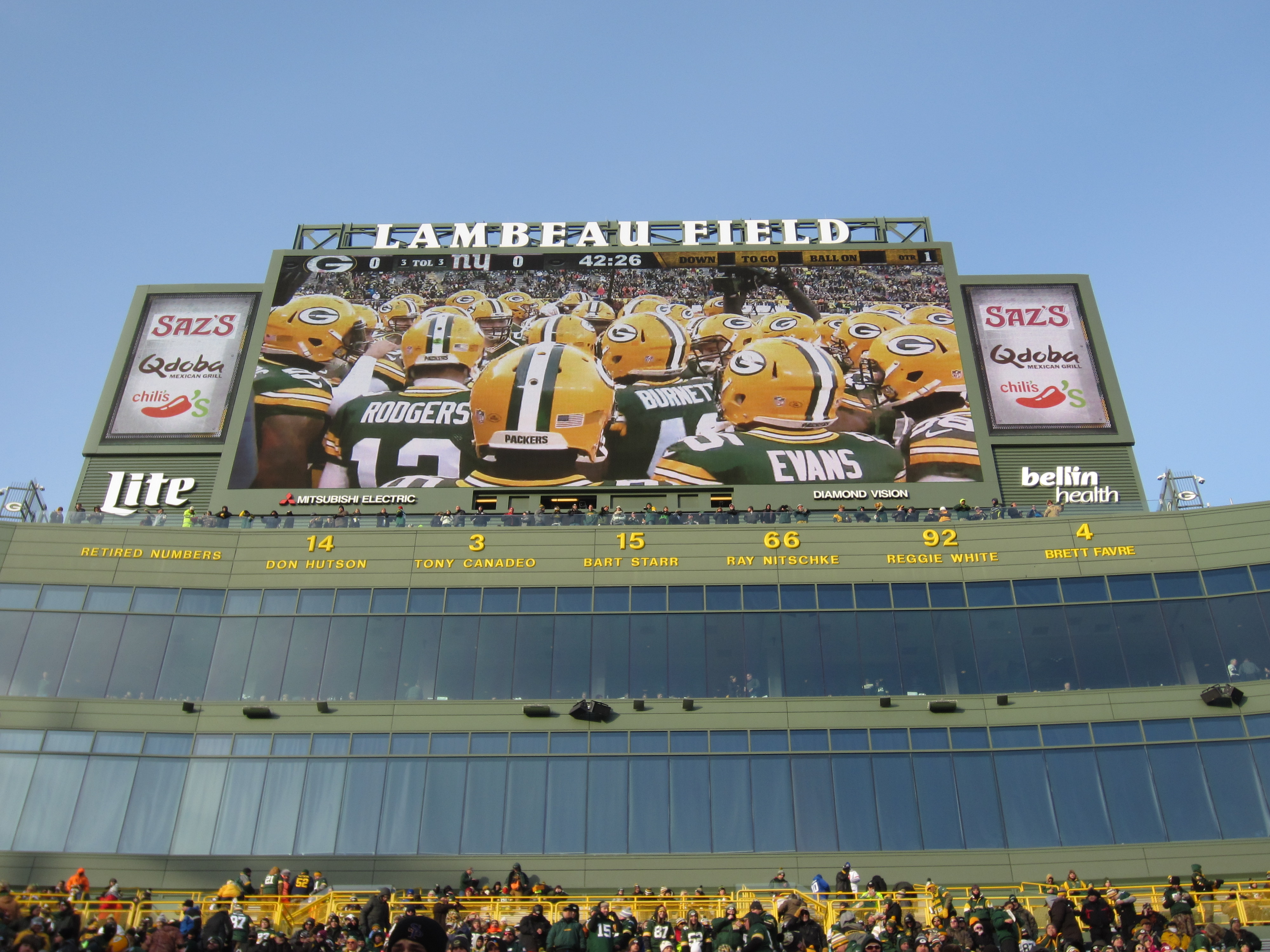
Lambeau Field's north end zone with the six retired numbers

The Green Bay Packers are a professional American football team based in Green Bay, Wisconsin. Since their founding in 1919, over 1,800 players, including 36 Pro Football Hall of Famers have played for the team. Of those 35, 6 players have had their uniform numbers officially retired by the organization. Professional sports franchises, including the Packers, retire uniform numbers to recognize the contributions that a player has made towards the team. It is customary that after the uniform number is retired, it is no longer worn by future players with that team. These uniform numbers are usually prominently displayed within the team's arena or stadium. In the case of the Packers, the retired numbers are displayed above the box seats in the north end zone of Lambeau Field.

== Packers history ==
The first Green Bay Packer to have his number retired was Don Hutson (No. 14) in 1951. Hutson played wide receiver for the Packers for 11 seasons where he set multiple National Football League (NFL) records and was named NFL Most Valuable Player (MVP) in 1941 and 1942. His number was retired by coach Gene Ronzani during a brief ceremony at halftime of a game against the New York Yanks. In 1952, Tony Canadeo became the second Packer to have his number (No. 3) retired, immediately after he retired from the NFL. Canadeo played offense, defense, and special teams for 11 seasons for the Packers, becoming the first Packer to rush for over 1,000 yards and winning the NFL championship in 1944. It is not known whether there was a ceremony recognizing the number retirement, however at the very least an unofficial recognition occurred in 1952. (Note: Canadeo stated that he recalled that the Packers retired his number and gave him a car to honor his contributions. However, a definitive account of the ceremony from a third-party source has yet to be identified.)

The third Packer to have his number retired was quarterback Bart Starr (No. 15). Over 16 seasons, Starr led the Packers to five NFL Championships, including the first two Super Bowls in 1966 and 1967. He was named Super Bowl MVP in both games and was the NFL MVP for the 1966 season. He may be most famous for his winning touchdown dive in the closing seconds of the 1967 NFL Championship Game, which became known as the "Ice Bowl". His number was retired during a ceremony at halftime of a game against the St. Louis Cardinals in 1973, two years after his career was over. Linebacker Ray Nitschke became the fourth Packer to have his number retired (No. 66) in 1983. Nitschke was a five-time NFL Champion and two-time Super Bowl winner under coach Vince Lombardi and anchored the Packers defense for 15 seasons. Nitschke's number was retired in 1983 in a small ceremony at a game against the Chicago Bears.

Reggie White's No. 92 was the fifth number to be retired by the Packers. White, who was known as the "Minister of Defense", came to the Packers as one of the first big signings of the newly revised NFL free agency rules in 1993 and played for the team for six seasons. As a Packer, he was a Super Bowl champion in 1996, a two-time first-team All-Pro and was named the NFL Defensive Player of the Year in 1998. His number was retired during a half-time ceremony in 2005, less than a year after his death from cardiac and pulmonary sarcoidosis in September 2004. He was the first and only Packer to have his number retired posthumously, and the first NFL player to have his number retired by two teams (the other being the Philadelphia Eagles). Quarterback Brett Favre, White's teammate for six seasons, became the sixth and most recent Packer to have his number (No. 4) retired. Favre played for the Packers for 16 seasons, starting a record 253 consecutive games at quarterback between 1992 and 2007 (a record that was extended to 297 games after his tenure with the Packers). Favre was 3-time NFL MVP, an 11-time Pro Bowl selection, and part of the NFL 1990s All-Decade Team. He led the Packers to their first championship games since the 1960s in Super Bowl XXXI and Super Bowl XXXII, winning the first and losing the second. His number was retired in 2015 at half-time during a game against the Chicago Bears.

== Retired numbers ==
Green Bay Packers retired numbers
No.	Image	Player name	Position	Seasons with the Packers	Year number retired	Honors and awards	Refs
A white number 3 with a green background.	An autographed photo of Tony Canadeo holding a football	Tony Canadeo (Note: In 1961, kicker Ben Agajanian, who played only three games for the Packers, wore Canadeo's No. 3 after being assigned it by mistake.)	Halfback	1941–1944; 1946–1952	1952	Pro Football Hall of Fame; 1944 NFL Champion; 2× first-team All-Pro	
A white number 4 with a green background.	A photo of Brett Favre from behind throwing a football	Brett Favre	Quarterback	1992–2007	2015	Pro Football Hall of Fame; 3× NFL MVP; Super Bowl XXXI Champion; 3× first-team All-Pro; 11× Pro Bowl	
A white number 14 with a green background.	A photo of Don Hutson running with the football	Don Hutson (Note: In 1972, quarterback Jerry Tagge was initially given the No. 14 during training camp, however he was shortly reissued the No. 17 prior to the beginning of the season.)	Wide receiver	1935–1945	1951	Pro Football Hall of Fame; 1941 and 1942 NFL MVP; 3× NFL Champion; 9× first-team All-Pro; 4× NFL All-Star	
A white number 15 with a green background.	A photo of Bart Starr pitching the football towards the camera	Bart Starr	Quarterback	1956–1971	1973	Pro Football Hall of Fame; 1966 NFL MVP; 2× Super Bowl Champion; 5× NFL Champion; First-team All-Pro (1966); 4× Pro Bowl	
A white number 66 with a green background.	A photo of Ray Nitschke holding his helmet	Ray Nitschke	Linebacker	1958–1972	1983	Pro Football Hall of Fame; 2× Super Bowl Champion; 5× NFL Champion; 2× first-team All-Pro; Pro Bowl (1964)	
A white number 92 with a green background.	Photo of Reggie White at the White House	Reggie White	Defensive end	1993–1998	2005	Pro Football Hall of Fame; Super Bowl XXXI Champion; 10× first-team All-Pro; 13× Pro Bowl; 2× NFL Defensive Player of the Year	

== Possible additions ==
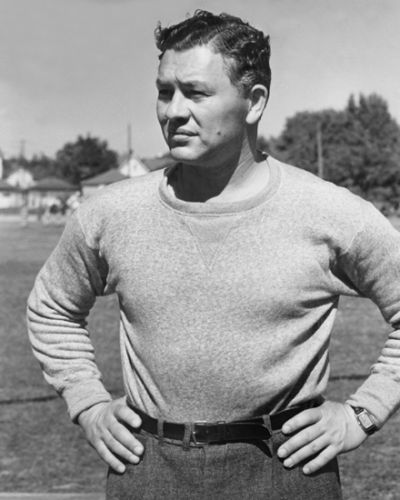
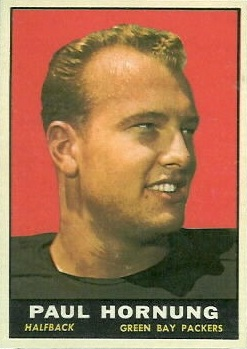
Curly Lambeau (left) and Paul Hornung (right) are two former Packers whose uniform numbers have been discussed as possibly being retired.

For almost 100 years, founder, coach, and player Curly Lambeau was the only Packer credited with wearing jersey No. 1, although it had never been formally retired and annually appears on the jersey presented to the team's first round draft pick. The Packers have recognized Lambeau in a more significant manner than just a number retirement by naming their current stadium Lambeau Field shortly after he died. After the Green Bay Packers traded for Micah Parsons prior to the 2025 NFL season, the edge rusher chose to wear No. 1 rather than his former No. 11, which was already taken by Jayden Reed.

Paul Hornung's No. 5 was unofficially retired at the Packers' annual press party on July 10, 1967, although there has not been a ceremony to put his number on the wall of retired numbers at Lambeau Field. The number retirement never became official for a couple of reasons. First, Vince Lombardi, who initiated the number retirement, left the organization less than seven months after the announcement and died a year later. Second, number retirements were not as well known or publicized back in the 1960s. Hornung's No. 5 has only been issued to four players since his retirement, and none since 1988. All of the players to wear the No. 5 after Hornung only played a few games for the Packers before leaving the team or changing uniform number.

Aaron Rodgers' No. 12 has been identified as the likely next number to be retired by the Packers

The No. 12 has also been identified as a potential number to retire to honor the contributions of former Packers quarterback Aaron Rodgers. Rodgers led the Packers to a victory in Super Bowl XLV, was named NFL MVP four times in 2011, 2014, 2020 and 2021 and has been one of the most successful quarterbacks in NFL history. In July 2023, Packers president Mark Murphy said the team plans to retire Rodgers' number "at the appropriate time".

== See also ==
- Lists of Green Bay Packers players
