= Old Scott, Oklahoma =

Unincorporated community in Oklahoma, US

Old Scott
- Unincorporated community
- Location within the state of Oklahoma Old Scott (the United States)
- Coordinates: 34°21′39″N 97°26′23″W
- Country: United States
- State: Oklahoma
- County: Carter
- Elevation: 896 ft (273 m)
- Time zone: UTC-6 (Central (CST))
  - Summer (DST): UTC-5 (CDT)
- GNIS feature ID: 1763557

Old Scott is an unincorporated community in Carter County, Oklahoma, United States.

The community is north-northeast of Healdton, going north on Oklahoma State Highway 76, east on Oklahoma State Highway 53, then north on Samedan Road.
