= Oklahoma State Highway 53 =

State highway in Oklahoma, United States

State Highway 53

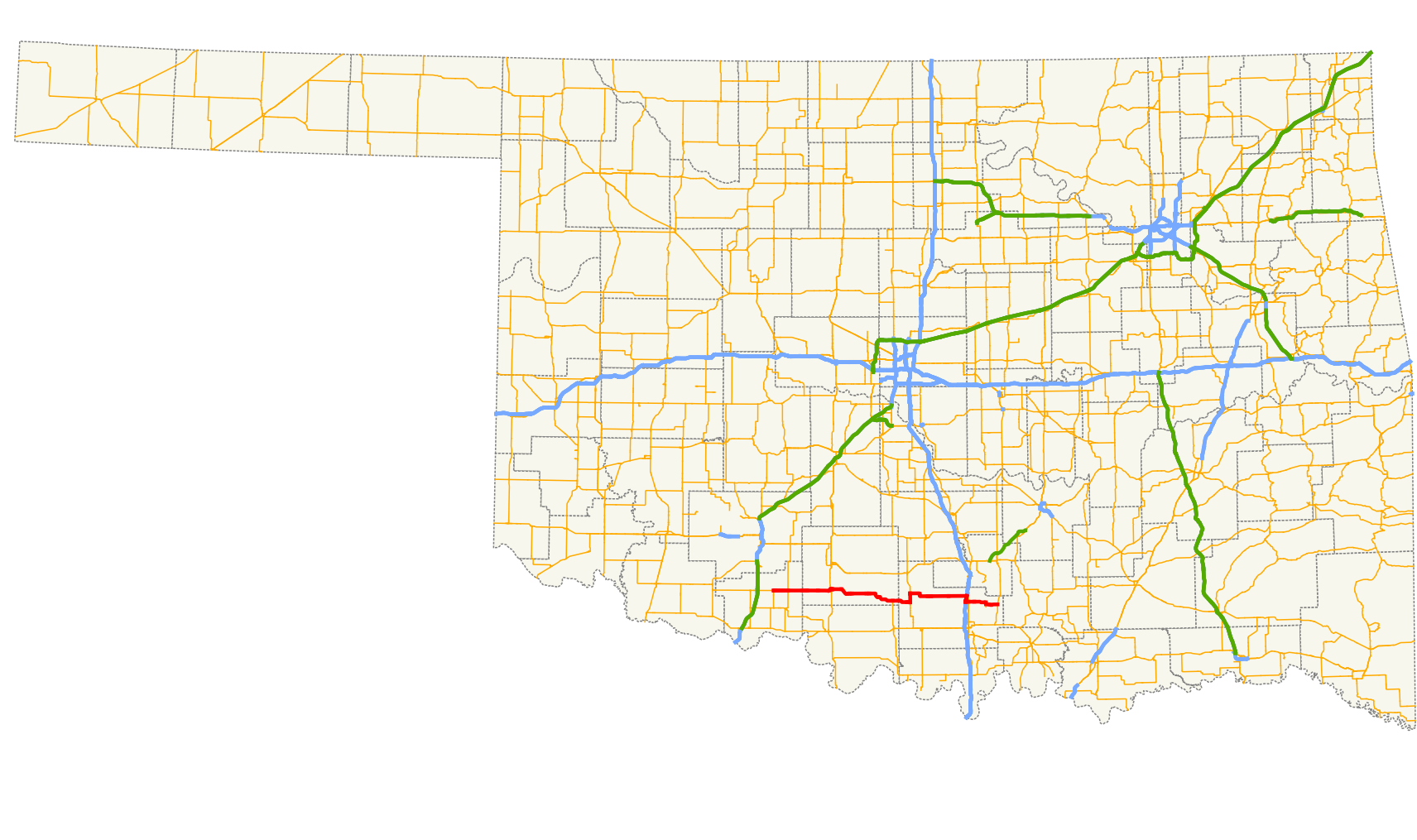

Route information
- Maintained by ODOT
- Length: 86.6 mi (139.4 km)

Major junctions
- West end: SH-5 in Walters
- US 81 in Comanche; I-35 near Springer; US 77 in Springer
- East end: US 177 east of Gene Autry

Location
- Country: United States
- State: Oklahoma

Highway system
- Oklahoma State Highway System; Interstate; US; State; Turnpikes
← SH-52	→ US 54

State Highway 53 is an 86.6-mile (139.4 km) highway in southern Oklahoma. It connects Walters in Cotton County to Gene Autry in Carter County. It has one lettered spur route, SH-53A, a spur route to Gene Autry.

== Route description ==
SH-53 begins at a T intersection in Walters, where State Highway 5 makes up the western and southern legs of the T. SH-53 runs eastward from here, crossing East Cache Creek. At Fivemile Corner, the road intersects SH-65, five miles (8 km) east of Walters. SH-53 continues due east into the Waurika Wildlife Management Area, where it crosses Beaver Creek and Little Beaver Creek (which at their confluence downstream of SH-53 are dammed to create Waurika Lake). After leaving the wildlife management area, SH-53 crosses into Stephens County.

About 2 miles (3.2 km) east of the Cottn–Stephens county line, SH-53 passes through Corum. The highway continues due east to the western outskirts of Comanche, where it curves northeast to pass through the city's downtown. There, it intersects US-81. SH-53 continues due east out of town as it approaches Comanche Lake, where it cuts away to the southeast before resuming its due east course. The highway then goes through a series of curves gradually sending it more southeast, passing through Loco. The route serves as the northern terminus for SH-89 just before crossing into Carter County.

The first highway junction that SH-53 encounters in Carter County begins a three-mile (5 km) concurrency with State Highway 76 north of Healdton. South of Fox, SH-53 splits off to the east. The highway passes through Clemscott, Graham, Milo, and Woodford before coming to an interchange with I-35. SH-53 joins southbound I-35, splitting off after two miles (3 km). It meets US-77 in Springer before passing through Gene Autry and ending at US-177.

== SH-53A ==
State Highway 53A
- Location: Gene Autry
- Length: 1.00 mi (1.61 km)

State Highway 53A is a one-mile (1.6 km) spur to Gene Autry. It begins at SH-53 near the entrance to the Ardmore Air Park, in northeastern Carter County. It is a narrow, two-lane state highway with no shoulders throughout its length in and around the town of Gene Autry. The road has an at-grade crossing with the Burlington Northern & Santa Fe railroad at the north end of Gene Autry, and the road continues through the town until it reaches its terminus at the southern grade crossing of the same railway.

=== Former SH-53A ===
State Highway 53A
- Location: Stephens County
- Length: 1.01 mi (1.63 km)
- Existed: ?–February 2, 2004

Another State Highway 53A was once a spur route to Comanche Lake. The highway was 1.01 miles (1.63 km) long. It was officially removed from the state highway system by action of the Transportation Commission on February 2, 2004.

== Junction list ==
County	Location	mi	km	Destinations	Notes
Cotton	Walters	0.0	0.0	SH-5	Western terminus
Cotton		5.0	8.0	SH-65	
Stephens	Comanche	20.2	32.5	US 81	
Stephens		43.1	69.4	SH-89	Northern terminus of SH-89
Carter		49.4	79.5	SH-76	Southern end of SH-76 concurrency
Carter	Fox	52.6	84.7	SH-76	Northern end of SH-76 concurrency
Carter		72.8	117.2	I-35	Northern end of I-35 concurrency, I-35 exit 42
Carter		74.9	120.5	I-35	Southern end of I-35 concurrency, I-35 exit 40
Carter	Springer	75.9	122.1	US 77	
Carter	Gene Autry	82.6	132.9	SH-53A	Northern terminus of SH-53A
Carter		86.6	139.4	US 177	Eastern terminus
1.000 mi = 1.609 km; 1.000 km = 0.621 mi: Concurrency terminus
