= Pike City, Oklahoma =

Ghost town in Oklahoma, US

Pike City
- Ghost town
- Location within the state of Oklahoma
- Coordinates: 34°22′07″N 97°30′01″W
- Country: United States
- State: Oklahoma
- County: Carter
- Elevation: 974 ft (297 m)
- Time zone: UTC-6 (Central (CST))
  - Summer (DST): UTC-5 (CDT)
- GNIS feature ID: 2376269

Pike City is a ghost town in Carter County, Oklahoma, United States. The town is located eight miles north of Healdton.
