= List of Green Bay Packers Pro Bowl selections =

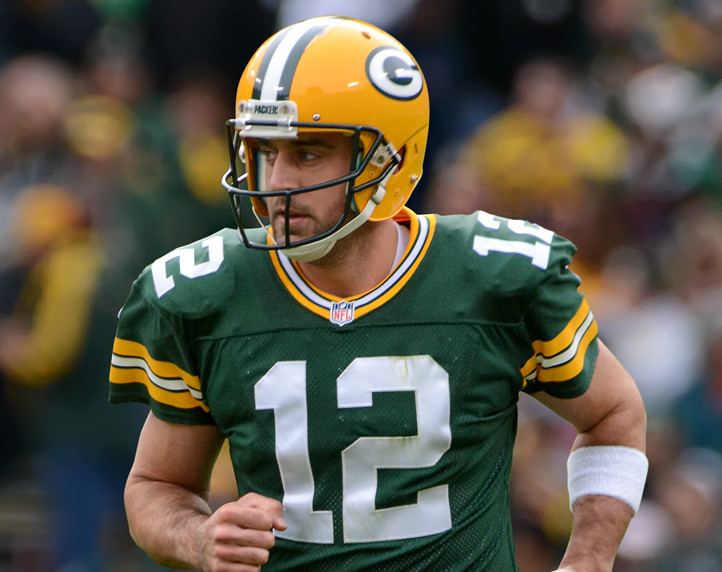
Quarterback Aaron Rodgers holds the team record for most Pro Bowl selections, with 10.

The Green Bay Packers are a professional American football team based in Green Bay, Wisconsin. The Packers have competed in the National Football League (NFL) since 1921, two years after their original founding by Curly Lambeau and George Whitney Calhoun. They are members of the North Division of the National Football Conference (NFC) and play their home games at Lambeau Field in central Wisconsin.

Starting with the 1938 NFL season, the NFL instituted an All-Star Game that pitted the league's championship team against a team made-up of the best players from the remaining teams. Five of these exhibition games were played, with the last occurring after the 1942 NFL season before the NFL reduced the number of teams and games in the season due to players serving in World War II. The first official Pro Bowl occurred in 1951 following the 1950 NFL season. From the 1950 season until the 1969 season, the exhibition game was played between teams representing the Eastern and Western Conferences of the NFL. After the American Football League (AFL) merged with the NFL in 1970, the game was played between teams representing the NFC and the American Football Conference (AFC). The conference team format remained until 2014 when the NFL shifted to a fantasy football format with teams selected by captains from the full pool of Pro Bowl selectees. This format only lasted for three seasons before it reverted to the conference team format from the 2016 to 2021 NFL seasons; this period included the cancellation of the 2021 Pro Bowl due to the COVID-19 pandemic (teams were still selected and players were still recognized as Pro Bowl selectees). Starting with the 2023 Pro Bowl after the 2022 NFL season, the NFL again changed the format; instead of playing an exhibition game, the Pro Bowl was converted to series of skill competitions that culminated in a non-contact flag football game.

Pro Bowl selections are made by a cumulative vote by three groups that hold equal weight: coaches, players and fans. Based on the results of the vote, each team is filled out based on generic positions on offense, defense and special teams. Prior to the institution of the Pro Bowl Games in 2023, the players with the most votes were named starters, while the remainder of the selectees were reserves. In the event that a Pro Bowl selectee is unable to participate in the Pro Bowl, either for health reasons or the fact they are playing in the Super Bowl right after the Pro Bowl, alternates are named in the players' place. These players are still considered official Pro Bowl selectees. The coaching staffs for each team have been selected in various ways, with the common option being the coaching staffs of the team with the best record in each conference who were not going to the Super Bowl given the honors. With the onset of the Pro Bowl Games, the NFL now selects the coaching staffs for the flag football game. Players for each team are paid for their participation, with a higher sum going to the winning team. Throughout the life of the Pro Bowl, awards have been given out to recognize the best player or players of the game. From 2016 to 2022, an award was given to an offensive and defensive most valuable player (MVP).

The Packers have had representatives at the Pro Bowl every year since 1950 except for nine seasons. The Packers' first selections in the inaugural Pro Bowl in 1951 were running back Billy Grimes and defensive tackle Ed Neal. The 1963 Pro Bowl and 1968 Pro Bowl each included nine Packers, the most that the team has ever sent to the Pro Bowl. Quarterback Aaron Rodgers holds the team record for most Pro Bowl selections with 10, while Forrest Gregg (nine selections), Brett Favre (nine selections) and Willie Wood (eight selections) round out the top four. Four Packers have been given a Pro Bowl MVP award. The most recent Pro Bowl selections for the Packers were Keisean Nixon and Micah Parsons for the 2026 Pro Bowl Games.

== Selections ==
=== All-Star Game (1938–42) ===
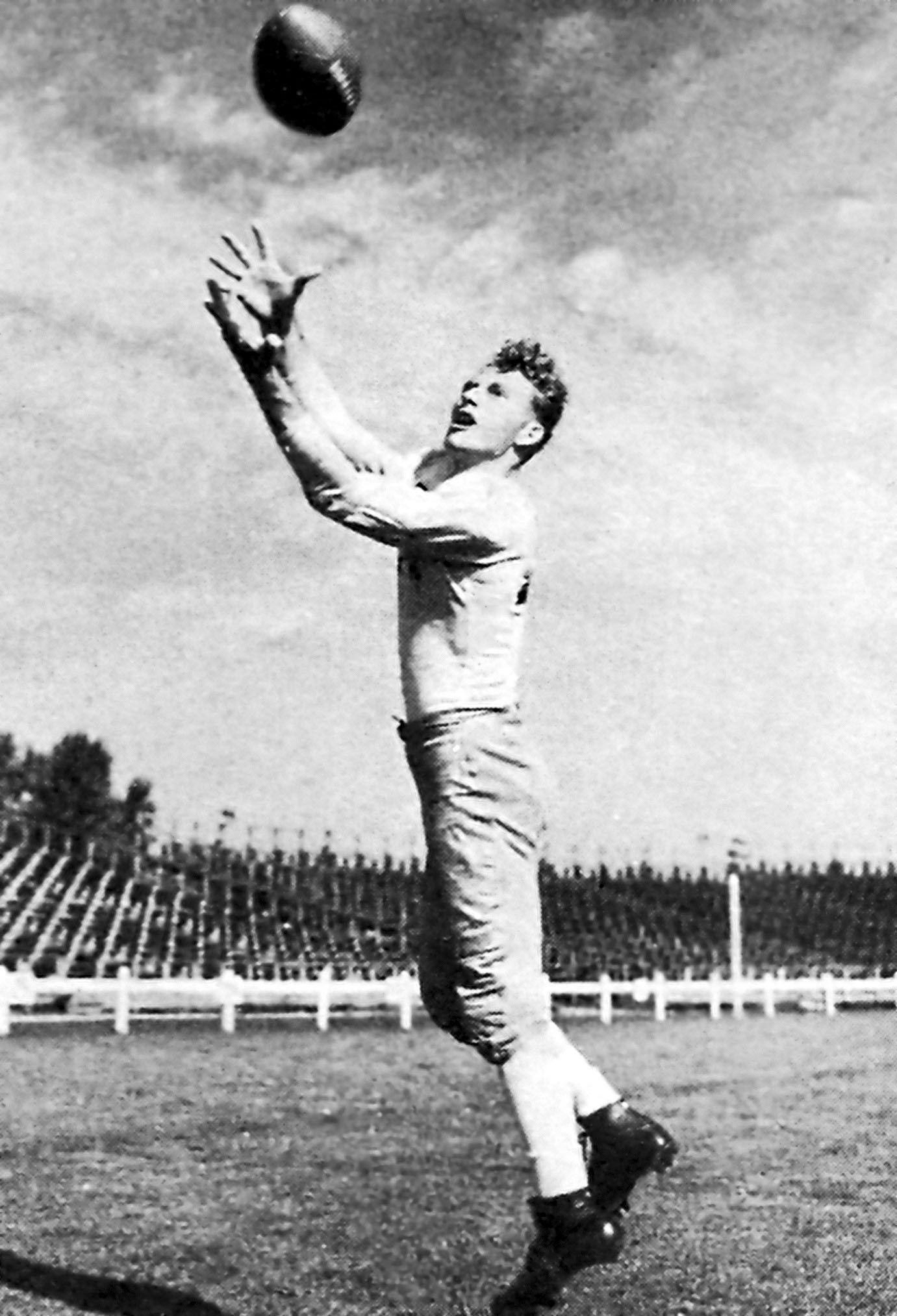
Don Hutson was selected for three All-Star Games, while also playing in the January 1940 All-Star Game where the Packers were the championship team playing the team of All-Stars.

Key
†	Selected as the NFL MVP for that season

Green Bay Packers NFL All-Star Game selections by year
Season	All-Star Game	# of Packers selected	Players (# of All-Star Games with Packers)	Position (Note: The position which the player was elected to the All-Star Game for.)	Refs
1938	January 1939	3	Cecil Isbell (1)	Back	
1938	January 1939	3	Russ Letlow (1)	Guard	
1938	January 1939	3	Clarke Hinkle (1)	Fullback	
1939	January 1940	N/A (Note: The Packers were the champions of the 1939 NFL season, thus their entire team played against the NFL All-Star team.)	N/A	N/A	
1940	December 1940	4	Charley Brock (1)	Back	
1940	December 1940	4	Clarke Hinkle (2)	Fullback	
1940	December 1940	4	Don Hutson (1)	End	
1940	December 1940	4	Carl Mulleneaux (1)	End	
1941	January 1942	3	Larry Craig (1)	Back	
1941	January 1942	3	Don Hutson (2) †	End	
1941	January 1942	3	Cecil Isbell (2)	Back	
1942	December 1942	4	Charley Brock (2)	Back	
1942	December 1942	4	Larry Craig (2)	Back	
1942	December 1942	4	Don Hutson (3) †	End	
1942	December 1942	4	Cecil Isbell (3)	Back	

=== Pro Bowl (1950–present) ===
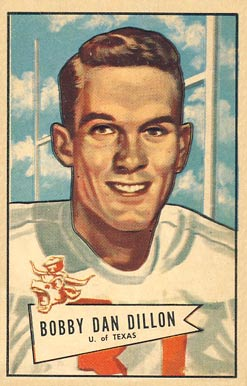
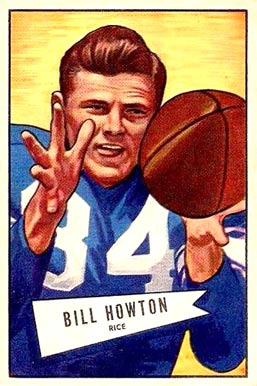
Bobby Dillon and Billy Howton were both selected to four Pro Bowls in the 1950s, the most for any Packer in that decade.

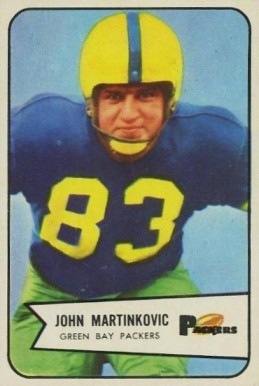
John Martinkovic became the first Packer to be selected to three straight Pro Bowls.

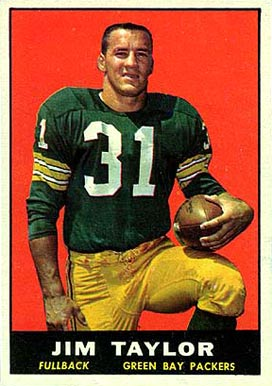
Jim Taylor was selected to five straight Pro Bowls during the 1960s.

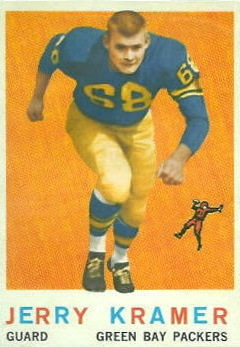
Jerry Kramer, a key blocker in Lombardi's famous Packers sweep, was selected for three Pro Bowls in his career.

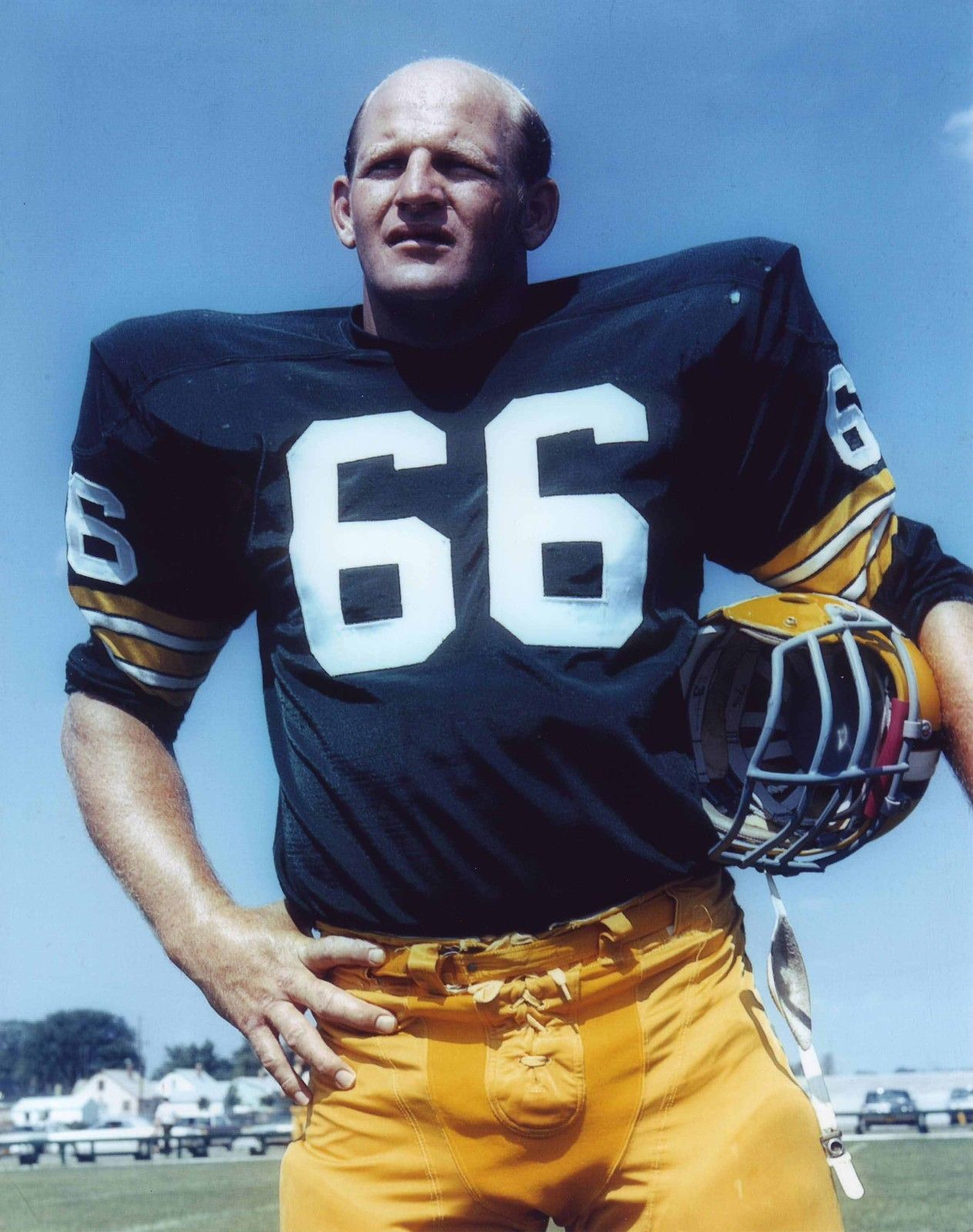
Ray Nitschke was only selected for one Pro Bowl in his career, even though he went on to be inducted into the Pro Football Hall of Fame.

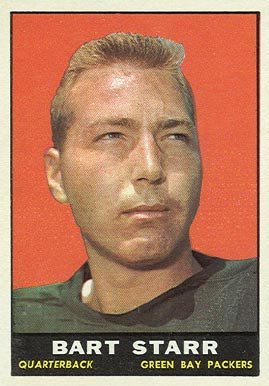
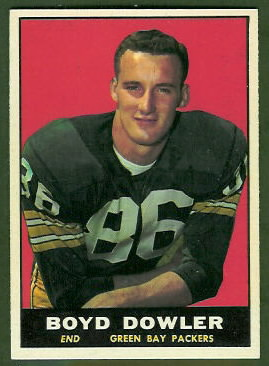
Despite being teammates for 10 seasons and being selected for a total of six Pro Bowls, quarterback Bart Starr (top) and wide receiver Boyd Dowler (bottom) were never selected the same year.

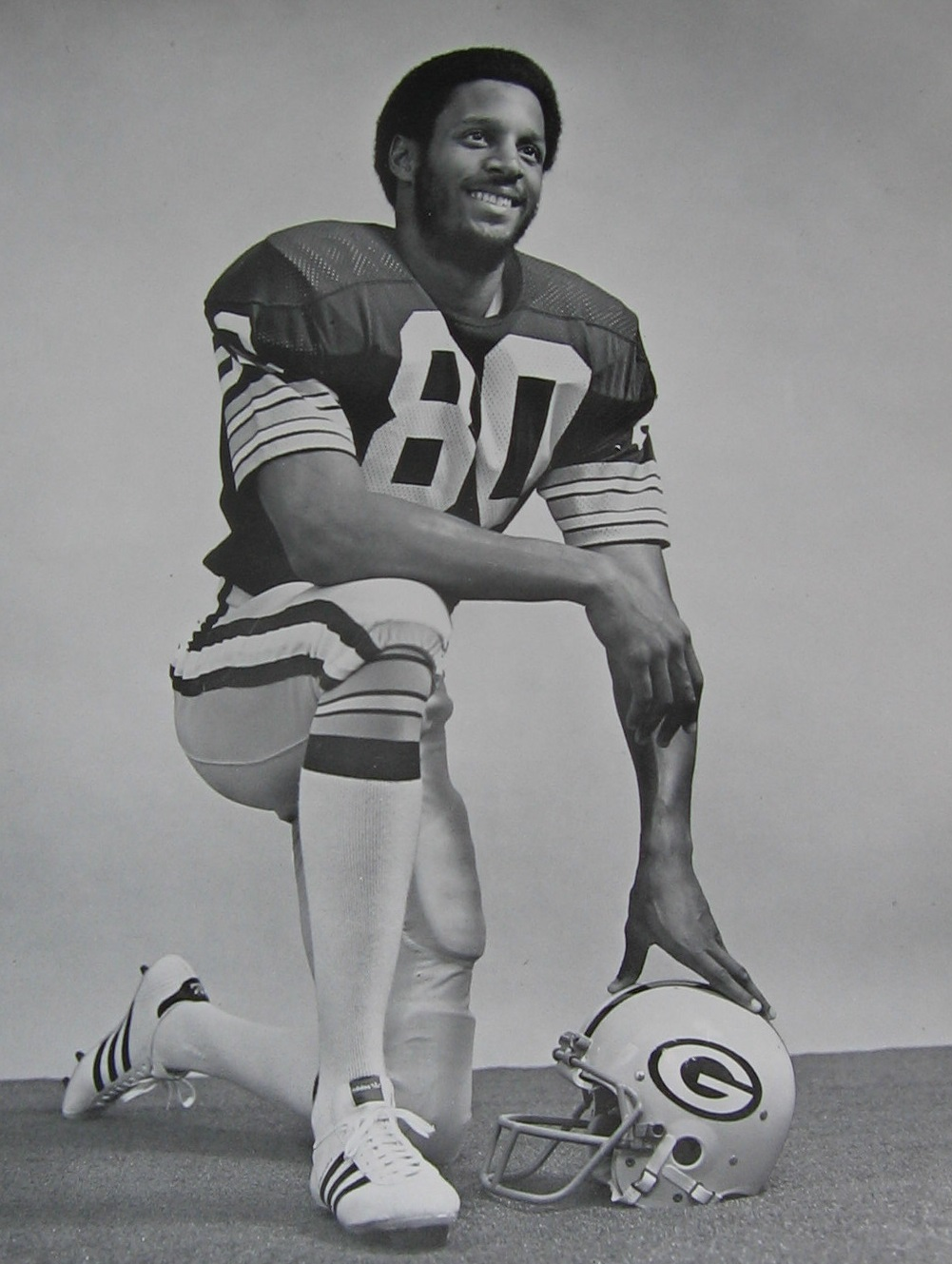
Of James Lofton's seven selections to the Pro Bowl, he was the only Packers player selected for three of them.

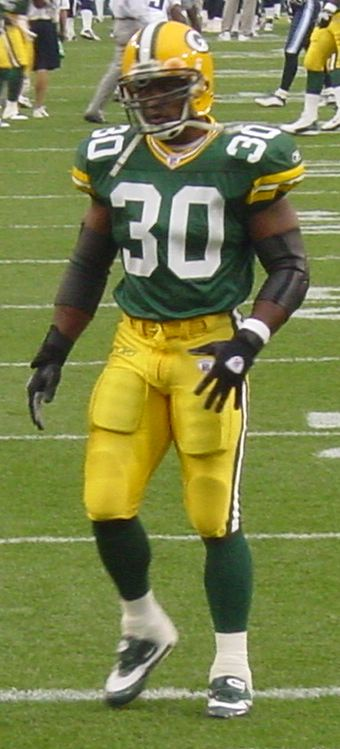
Ahman Green went to four straight Pro Bowls in the early 2000s.

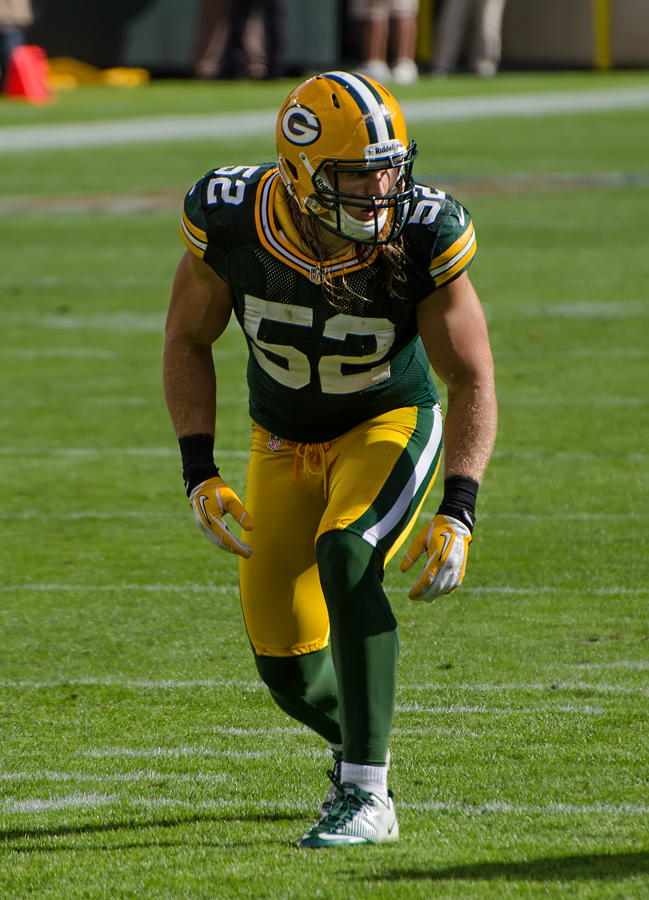
Clay Matthews III became the third member of the Matthews family to be selected for a Pro Bowl, joining his father Clay Matthews Jr. and his uncle Bruce Matthews. Jake Matthews, the son of Bruce and cousin to Clay, later became the fourth.

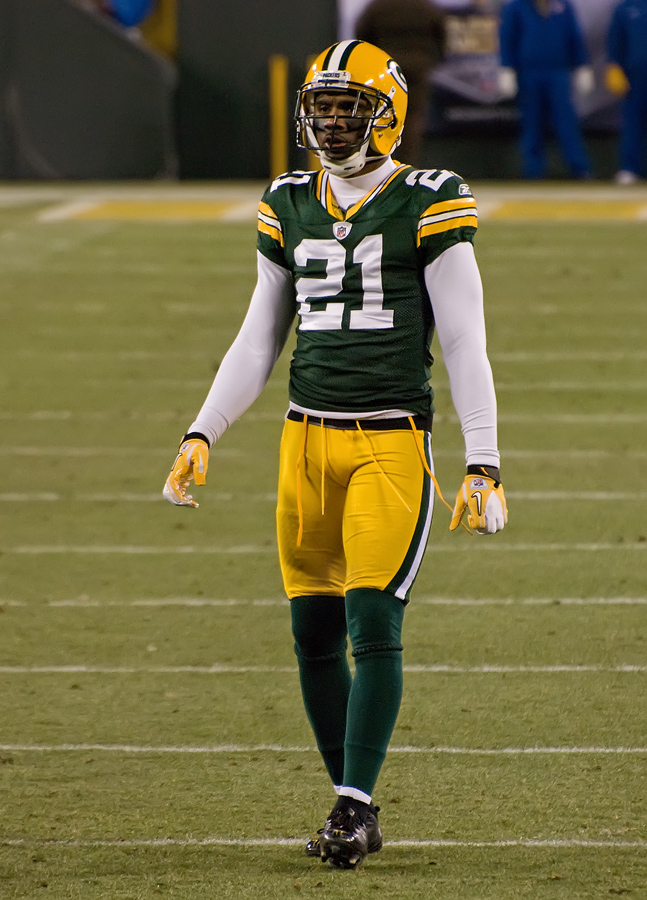
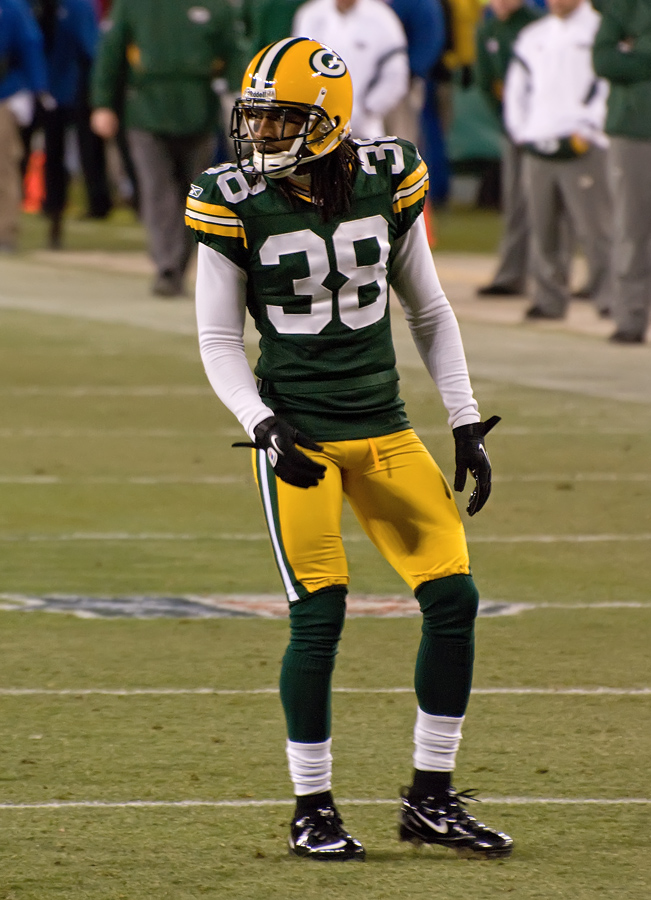
Charles Woodson (top) and Tramon Williams (bottom) formed a Pro Bowl cornerback tandem for the Packers in the 2011 Pro Bowl.

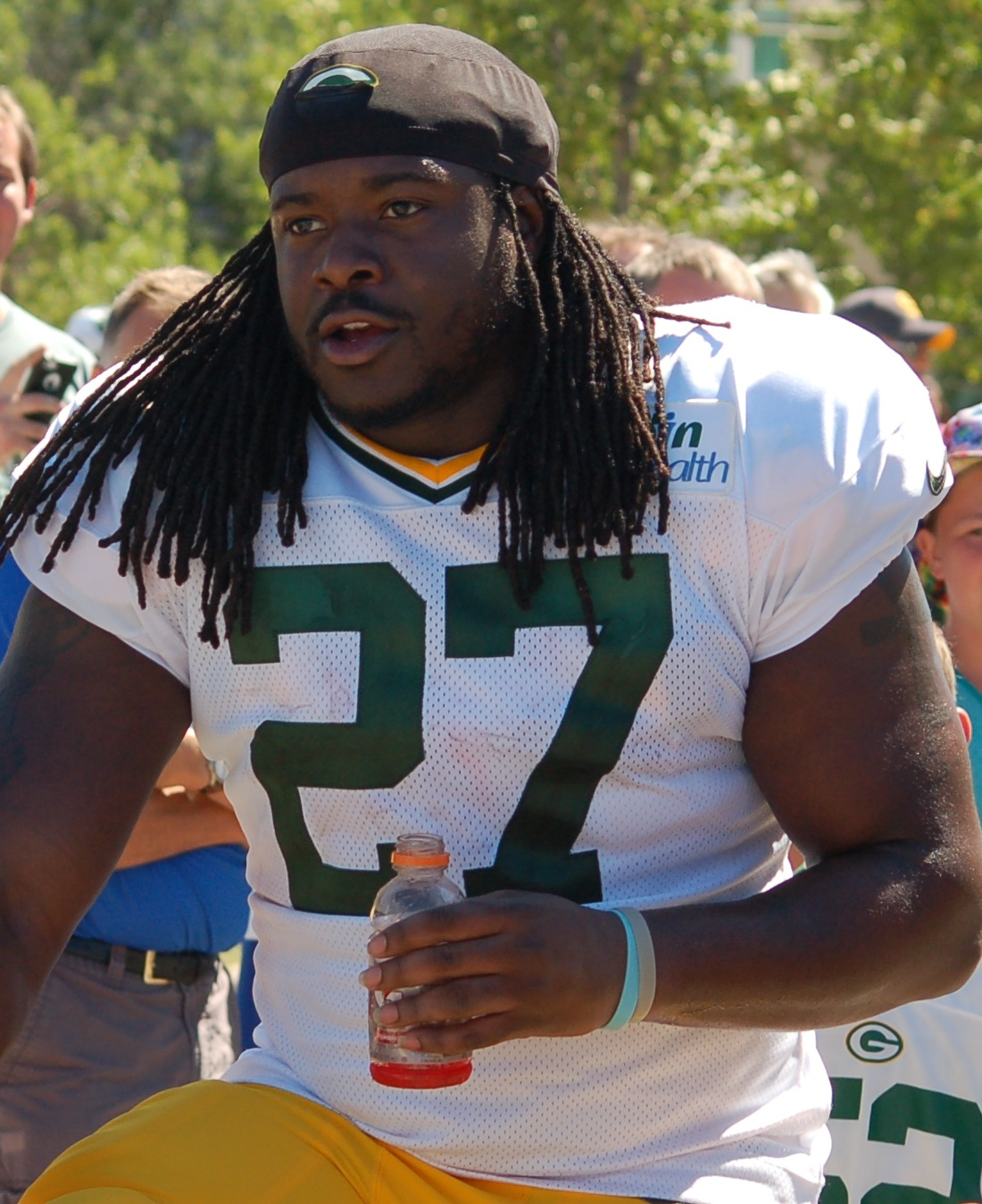
Running back Eddie Lacy was the Packers' only representative to the 2014 Pro Bowl.

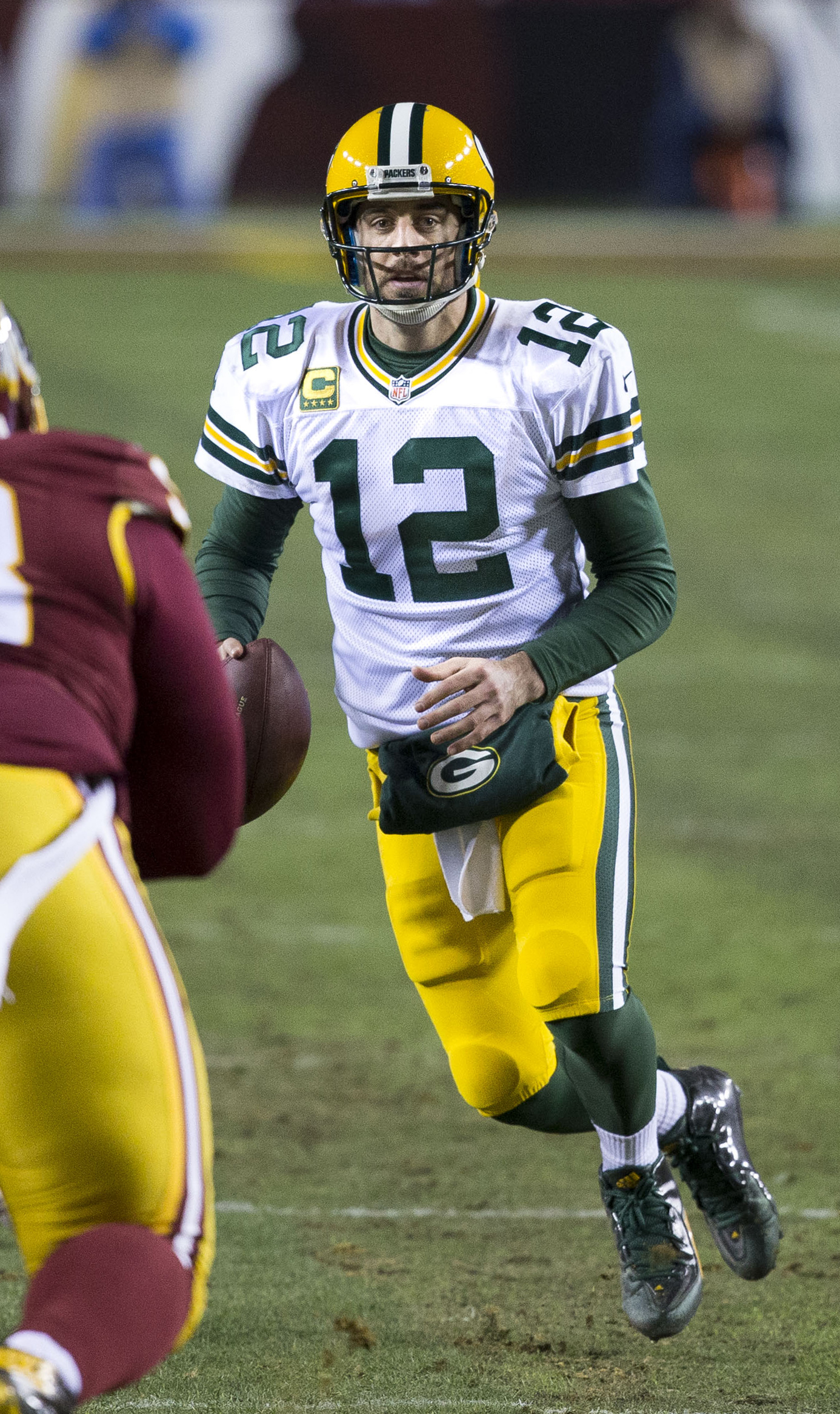
Aaron Rodgers' selection for the 2022 Pro Bowl was his tenth, the most of any Packer ever.

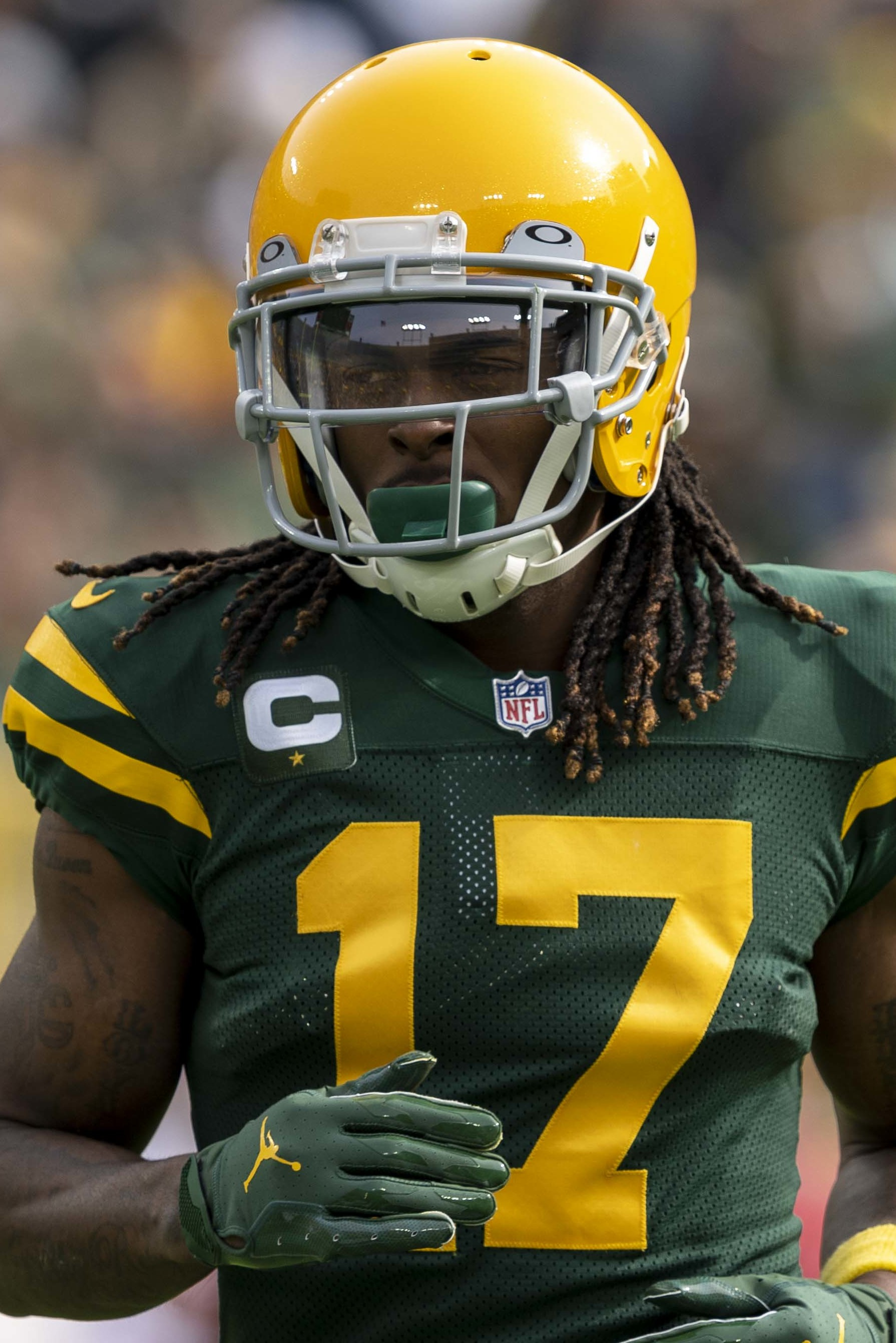
Davante Adams was selected to five straight Pro Bowls before being traded to the Oakland Raiders after the 2021 NFL season.

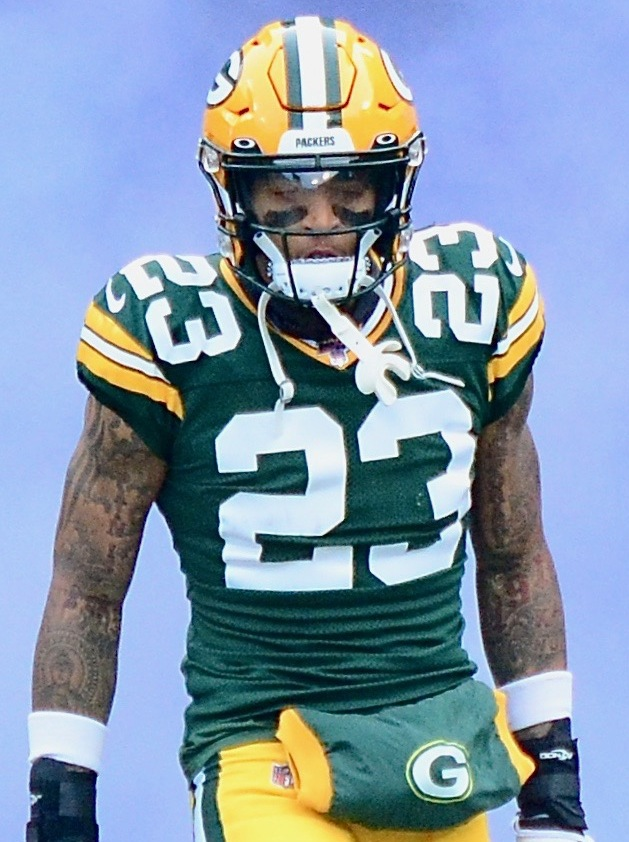
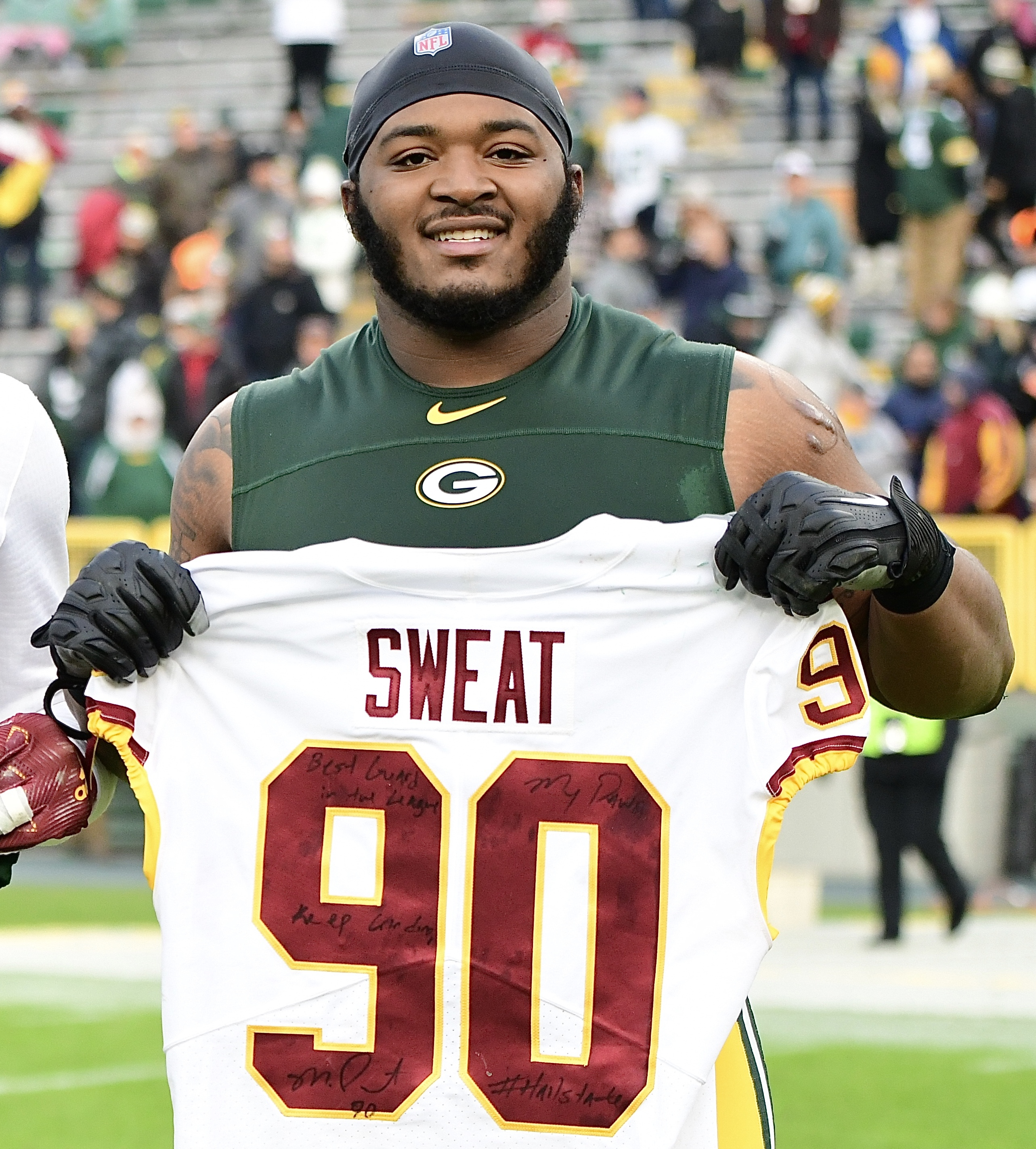
Jaire Alexander (top) and Elgton Jenkins (bottom) were selected for the inaugural Pro Bowl games in 2023.

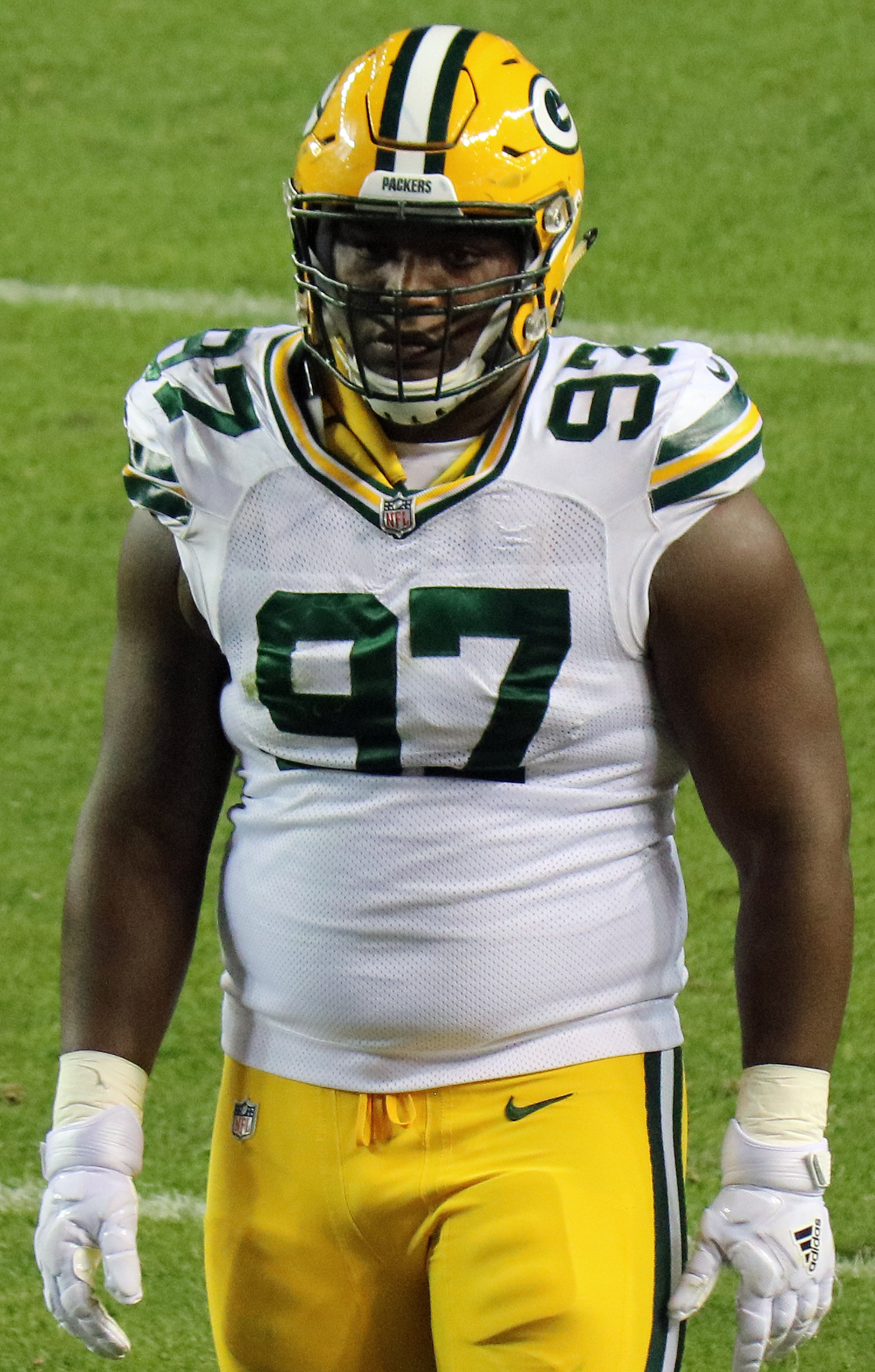
Kenny Clark was the only Packer selected for the 2024 Pro Bowl Games.

Key
*	Selected as Pro Bowl MVP (Note: At different times, the Pro Bowl MVP Award has also been called the "Player of the Game". It has also been handed out to more than one player: in the past it was given to the best back and the best lineman and more recently it is given to the best offensive and defensive players.)
†	Selected as the NFL MVP for that season

Green Bay Packers Pro Bowl selections by year
Season	Pro Bowl (Note: The Pro Bowl is held at the end of the season, which typically occurs during the next calendar year. As an example, the 1951 Pro Bowl included Pro Bowl selectees from the 1950 NFL season.)	# of Packers selected	Players (# of Pro Bowls with Packers)	Position (Note: The position which the player was elected to the Pro Bowl for.)	Refs
1950	1951	2	Billy Grimes (1)	Running back	
1950	1951	2	Ed Neal (1)	Defensive tackle	
1951	1952	2	Billy Grimes (2)	Running back	
1951	1952	2	Dick Wildung (1)	Tackle	
1952	1953	3	Billy Howton (1)	End	
1952	1953	3	Deral Teteak (1)	Linebacker	
1952	1953	3	Abner Wimberly (1)	Defensive end	
1953	1954	3	Dave Hanner (1)	Defensive tackle	
1953	1954	3	John Martinkovic (1)	Defensive end	
1953	1954	3	Clayton Tonnemaker (1)	Linebacker	
1954	1955	3	Dave Hanner (2)	Defensive tackle	
1954	1955	3	John Martinkovic (2) (Note: Sources conflict on whether Martinkovic was selected for the 1955 Pro Bowl. Pro-Football-Reference.com does not include him on the 1955 team, while Packers historian Cliff Christl includes it in his write-up of Martinkovic for the Green Bay Packers Hall of Fame. The Green Bay Press-Gazette notes in Martinkovic's obituary that he was a "three-time Pro Bowl choice" and the Green Bay Packers media guide includes the selection, lending credence to Christl's declaration.)	Defensive end	
1954	1955	3	Roger Zatkoff (1)	Linebacker	
1955	1956	5	Bobby Dillon (1)	Safety	
1955	1956	5	Howie Ferguson (1)	Fullback	
1955	1956	5	Billy Howton (2)	End	
1955	1956	5	John Martinkovic (3)	Defensive end	
1955	1956	5	Roger Zatkoff (2)	Linebacker	
1956	1957	4	Bobby Dillon (2)	Safety	
1956	1957	4	Billy Howton (3)	End	
1956	1957	4	Tobin Rote (1)	Quarterback	
1956	1957	4	Roger Zatkoff (3)	Linebacker	
1957	1958	3	Bobby Dillon (3)	Safety	
1957	1958	3	Billy Howton (4)	End	
1957	1958	3	Jim Ringo (1)	Center	
1958	1959	2	Bobby Dillon (4)	Safety	
1958	1959	2	Jim Ringo (2)	Center	
1959	1960	5	Bill Forester (1)	Linebacker	
1959	1960	5	Forrest Gregg (1)	Tackle	
1959	1960	5	Paul Hornung (1)	Back	
1959	1960	5	Jim Ringo (3)	Center	
1959	1960	5	Emlen Tunnell (1)	Safety	
1960	1961	8	Dan Currie (1)	Linebacker	
1960	1961	8	Bill Forester (2)	Linebacker	
1960	1961	8	Forrest Gregg (2)	Tackle	
1960	1961	8	Paul Hornung (2) †	Back	
1960	1961	8	Henry Jordan (1)	Defensive tackle	
1960	1961	8	Jim Ringo (4)	Center	
1960	1961	8	Bart Starr (1)	Quarterback	
1960	1961	8	Jim Taylor (1)	Fullback	
1961	1962	8	Bill Forester (3)	Linebacker	
1961	1962	8	Forrest Gregg (3)	Tackle	
1961	1962	8	Henry Jordan (2) *	Defensive tackle	
1961	1962	8	Max McGee (1)	End	
1961	1962	8	Jim Ringo (5)	Center	
1961	1962	8	Bart Starr (2)	Quarterback	
1961	1962	8	Jim Taylor (2) †	Fullback	
1961	1962	8	Jesse Whittenton (1)	Cornerback	
1962	1963	9	Bill Forester (4)	Linebacker	
1962	1963	9	Forrest Gregg (4)	Tackle	
1962	1963	9	Jerry Kramer (1)	Guard	
1962	1963	9	Ron Kramer (1)	End	
1962	1963	9	Tom Moore (1)	Running back	
1962	1963	9	Jim Ringo (6)	Center	
1962	1963	9	Bart Starr (3)	Quarterback	
1962	1963	9	Jim Taylor (3)	Fullback	
1962	1963	9	Willie Wood (1)	Safety	
1963	1964	8	Herb Adderley (1)	Cornerback	
1963	1964	8	Willie Davis (1)	Defensive end	
1963	1964	8	Forrest Gregg (5)	Tackle	
1963	1964	8	Henry Jordan (3)	Defensive tackle	
1963	1964	8	Jerry Kramer (2)	Guard	
1963	1964	8	Jim Ringo (7)	Center	
1963	1964	8	Jim Taylor (4)	Fullback	
1963	1964	8	Jesse Whittenton (2)	Cornerback	
1964	1965	6	Herb Adderley (2)	Cornerback	
1964	1965	6	Willie Davis (2)	Defensive end	
1964	1965	6	Forrest Gregg (6)	Tackle	
1964	1965	6	Ray Nitschke (1)	Linebacker	
1964	1965	6	Jim Taylor (5)	Fullback	
1964	1965	6	Willie Wood (2)	Safety	
1965	1966	5	Herb Adderley (3)	Cornerback	
1965	1966	5	Lee Roy Caffey (1)	Linebacker	
1965	1966	5	Willie Davis (3)	Defensive end	
1965	1966	5	Boyd Dowler (1)	Wide receiver	
1965	1966	5	Willie Wood (3)	Safety	
1966	1967	8	Herb Adderley (4)	Cornerback	
1966	1967	8	Willie Davis (4)	Defensive end	
1966	1967	8	Forrest Gregg (7)	Tackle	
1966	1967	8	Henry Jordan (4)	Defensive tackle	
1966	1967	8	Dave Robinson (1)	Linebacker	
1966	1967	8	Bob Skoronski (1)	Tackle	
1966	1967	8	Bart Starr (4) †	Quarterback	
1966	1967	8	Willie Wood (4)	Safety	
1967	1968	9	Herb Adderley (5)	Cornerback	
1967	1968	9	Don Chandler (1)	Placekicker	
1967	1968	9	Willie Davis (5)	Defensive end	
1967	1968	9	Boyd Dowler (2)	Wide receiver	
1967	1968	9	Forrest Gregg (8)	Tackle	
1967	1968	9	Bob Jeter (1)	Cornerback	
1967	1968	9	Jerry Kramer (3)	Guard	
1967	1968	9	Dave Robinson (2) *	Linebacker	
1967	1968	9	Willie Wood (5)	Safety	
1968	1969	4	Donny Anderson (1)	Running back	
1968	1969	4	Carroll Dale (1)	Wide receiver	
1968	1969	4	Forrest Gregg (9)	Tackle	
1968	1969	4	Willie Wood (6)	Safety	
1969	1970	5	Carroll Dale (2)	Wide receiver	
1969	1970	5	Gale Gillingham (1)	Guard	
1969	1970	5	Bob Jeter (2)	Cornerback	
1969	1970	5	Dave Robinson (3)	Linebacker	
1969	1970	5	Willie Wood (7)	Safety	
1970	1971	4	Fred Carr (1) *	Linebacker	
1970	1971	4	Carroll Dale (3)	Wide receiver	
1970	1971	4	Gale Gillingham (2)	Guard	
1970	1971	4	Willie Wood (8)	Safety	
1971	1972	2	John Brockington (1)	Running back	
1971	1972	2	Gale Gillingham (3)	Guard	
1972	1973	4	John Brockington (2)	Running back	
1972	1973	4	Bob Brown (1)	Defensive end	
1972	1973	4	Fred Carr (2)	Linebacker	
1972	1973	4	Chester Marcol (1)	Placekicker	
1973	1974	4	John Brockington (3)	Running back	
1973	1974	4	Jim Carter (1)	Linebacker	
1973	1974	4	Ken Ellis (1)	Cornerback	
1973	1974	4	Gale Gillingham (4)	Guard	
1974	1975	5	Willie Buchanon (1)	Cornerback	
1974	1975	5	Ken Ellis (2)	Cornerback	
1974	1975	5	Gale Gillingham (5)	Guard	
1974	1975	5	Ted Hendricks (1)	Linebacker	
1974	1975	5	Chester Marcol (2)	Placekicker	
1975	1976	2	Fred Carr (3)	Linebacker	
1975	1976	2	Steve Odom (1)	Return specialist	
1976	1977	0	None	N/A	
1977	1978	0	None	N/A	
1978	1979	4	Willie Buchanon (2)	Cornerback	
1978	1979	4	Ezra Johnson (1)	Defensive end	
1978	1979	4	James Lofton (1)	Wide receiver	
1978	1979	4	Terdell Middleton (1)	Running back	
1979	1980	0	None	N/A	
1980	1981	1	James Lofton (2)	Wide receiver	
1981	1982	1	James Lofton (3)	Wide receiver	
1982	1983	4	Paul Coffman (1)	Tight end	
1982	1983	4	John Jefferson (1) *	Wide receiver	
1982	1983	4	James Lofton (4)	Wide receiver	
1982	1983	4	Larry McCarren (1)	Center	
1983	1984	3	Paul Coffman (2)	Tight end	
1983	1984	3	James Lofton (5)	Wide receiver	
1983	1984	3	Larry McCarren (2)	Center	
1984	1985	2	Paul Coffman (3)	Tight end	
1984	1985	2	James Lofton (6)	Wide receiver	
1985	1986	1	James Lofton (7)	Wide receiver	
1986	1987	0	None	N/A	
1987	1988	0	None	N/A	
1988	1989	0	None	N/A	
1989	1990	4	Brent Fullwood (1)	Running back	
1989	1990	4	Tim Harris (1)	Linebacker	
1989	1990	4	Don Majkowski (1)	Quarterback	
1989	1990	4	Sterling Sharpe (1)	Wide receiver	
1990	1991	1	Sterling Sharpe (2)	Wide receiver	
1991	1992	0	None	N/A	
1992	1993	3	Chuck Cecil (1)	Safety	
1992	1993	3	Brett Favre (1)	Quarterback	
1992	1993	3	Sterling Sharpe (3)	Wide receiver	
1993	1994	4	LeRoy Butler (1)	Safety	
1993	1994	4	Brett Favre (2)	Quarterback	
1993	1994	4	Sterling Sharpe (4)	Wide receiver	
1993	1994	4	Reggie White (1)	Defensive end	
1994	1995	3	Bryce Paup (1)	Linebacker	
1994	1995	3	Sterling Sharpe (5)	Wide receiver	
1994	1995	3	Reggie White (2)	Defensive end	
1995	1996	3	Mark Chmura (1)	Tight end	
1995	1996	3	Brett Favre (3) †	Quarterback	
1995	1996	3	Reggie White (3)	Defensive end	
1996	1997	5	LeRoy Butler (2)	Safety	
1996	1997	5	Brett Favre (4) †	Quarterback	
1996	1997	5	Keith Jackson (1)	Tight end	
1996	1997	5	Reggie White (4)	Defensive end	
1996	1997	5	Frank Winters (1)	Center	
1997	1998	6	Mark Chmura (2)	Tight end	
1997	1998	6	Brett Favre (5) †	Quarterback	
1997	1998	6	LeRoy Butler (3)	Safety	
1997	1998	6	Travis Jervey (1)	Special teams	
1997	1998	6	Dorsey Levens	Running back	
1997	1998	6	Reggie White (5)	Defensive end	
1998	1999	5	LeRoy Butler (4)	Safety	
1998	1999	5	Mark Chmura (3)	Tight end	
1998	1999	5	Antonio Freeman (1)	Wide receiver	
1998	1999	5	Roell Preston (1)	Return specialist	
1998	1999	5	Reggie White (6)	Defensive end	
1999	2000	0	None	N/A	
2000	2001	1	Darren Sharper (1)	Safety	
2001	2002	3	Brett Favre (6)	Quarterback	
2001	2002	3	Bubba Franks (1)	Tight end	
2001	2002	3	Ahman Green (1)	Running back	
2002	2003	6	Donald Driver (1)	Wide receiver	
2002	2003	6	Brett Favre (7)	Quarterback	
2002	2003	6	Bubba Franks (2)	Tight end	
2002	2003	6	Ahman Green (2)	Running back	
2002	2003	6	Marco Rivera (1)	Guard	
2002	2003	6	Darren Sharper (2)	Safety	
2003	2004	6	Brett Favre (8)	Quarterback	
2003	2004	6	Mike Flanagan (1)	Center	
2003	2004	6	Bubba Franks (3)	Tight end	
2003	2004	6	Kabeer Gbaja-Biamila (1)	Defensive end	
2003	2004	6	Ahman Green (3)	Running back	
2003	2004	6	Marco Rivera (2)	Guard	
2004	2005	4	Ahman Green (4)	Running back	
2004	2005	4	William Henderson (1)	Fullback	
2004	2005	4	Marco Rivera (3)	Guard	
2004	2005	4	Javon Walker (1)	Wide receiver	
2005	2006	0	None	N/A	
2006	2007	2	Donald Driver (2)	Wide receiver	
2006	2007	2	Aaron Kampman (1)	Defensive end	
2007	2008	5	Chad Clifton (1)	Tackle	
2007	2008	5	Donald Driver (3)	Wide receiver	
2007	2008	5	Brett Favre (9)	Quarterback	
2007	2008	5	Al Harris (1)	Cornerback	
2007	2008	5	Aaron Kampman (2)	Defensive end	
2008	2009	3	Nick Collins (1)	Safety	
2008	2009	3	Al Harris (2)	Cornerback	
2008	2009	3	Charles Woodson (1)	Cornerback	
2009	2010	4	Nick Collins (2)	Safety	
2009	2010	4	Clay Matthews III (1)	Linebacker	
2009	2010	4	Aaron Rodgers (1)	Quarterback	
2009	2010	4	Charles Woodson (2)	Cornerback	
2010	2011	8	Chad Clifton (2)	Tackle	
2010	2011	8	Nick Collins (3)	Safety	
2010	2011	8	Donald Driver (4)	Wide receiver	
2010	2011	8	A. J. Hawk (1)	Linebacker	
2010	2011	8	Greg Jennings (1)	Wide receiver	
2010	2011	8	Clay Matthews III (2)	Linebacker	
2010	2011	8	Tramon Williams (1)	Cornerback	
2010	2011	8	Charles Woodson (3)	Cornerback	
2011	2012	7	Greg Jennings (2)	Wide receiver	
2011	2012	7	John Kuhn (1)	Fullback	
2011	2012	7	Clay Matthews III (3)	Linebacker	
2011	2012	7	B. J. Raji (1)	Defensive tackle	
2011	2012	7	Aaron Rodgers (2) †	Quarterback	
2011	2012	7	Scott Wells (1)	Center	
2011	2012	7	Charles Woodson (4)	Cornerback	
2012	2013	4	Clay Matthews III (4)	Linebacker	
2012	2013	4	Aaron Rodgers (3)	Quarterback	
2012	2013	4	Jeff Saturday (1)	Center	
2012	2013	4	Josh Sitton (1)	Guard	
2013	2014	1	Eddie Lacy (1)	Running back	
2014	2015	7	Randall Cobb (1)	Wide receiver	
2014	2015	7	John Kuhn (2)	Fullback	
2014	2015	7	Clay Matthews III (5)	Linebacker	
2014	2015	7	Jordy Nelson (1)	Wide receiver	
2014	2015	7	Aaron Rodgers (4) †	Quarterback	
2014	2015	7	Sam Shields (1)	Cornerback	
2014	2015	7	Josh Sitton (2)	Guard	
2015	2016	5	John Kuhn (3)	Fullback	
2015	2016	5	Clay Matthews III (6)	Linebacker	
2015	2016	5	Julius Peppers (1)	Defensive end	
2015	2016	5	Aaron Rodgers (5)	Quarterback	
2015	2016	5	Josh Sitton (3)	Guard	
2016	2017	4	David Bakhtiari (1)	Tackle	
2016	2017	4	Ha Ha Clinton-Dix (1)	Safety	
2016	2017	4	T. J. Lang (1)	Guard	
2016	2017	4	Aaron Rodgers (6)	Quarterback	
2017	2018	2	Davante Adams (1)	Wide receiver	
2017	2018	2	Mike Daniels (1)	Defensive tackle	
2018	2019	2	Davante Adams (2)	Wide receiver	
2018	2019	2	Aaron Rodgers (7)	Quarterback	
2019	2020	5	Davante Adams (3)	Wide receiver	
2019	2020	5	David Bakhtiari (2)	Tackle	
2019	2020	5	Kenny Clark (1)	Defensive tackle	
2019	2020	5	Aaron Rodgers (8)	Quarterback	
2019	2020	5	Za'Darius Smith (1)	Linebacker	
2020	2021 (Note: The 2021 Pro Bowl was cancelled due to the COVID-19 pandemic.)	7	Davante Adams (4)	Wide receiver	
2020	2021	7	Jaire Alexander (1)	Cornerback	
2020	2021	7	David Bakhtiari (3)	Tackle	
2020	2021	7	Elgton Jenkins (1)	Guard	
2020	2021	7	Aaron Jones (1)	Running back	
2020	2021	7	Aaron Rodgers (9) †	Quarterback	
2020	2021	7	Za'Darius Smith (2)	Linebacker	
2021	2022	3	Davante Adams (5)	Wide receiver	
2021	2022	3	Kenny Clark (2)	Defensive tackle	
2021	2022	3	Aaron Rodgers (10) †	Quarterback	
2022	2023 (Note: The NFL changed the format for the Pro Bowl; instead of an exhibition full contact game, Pro Bowl selectees competed in various skills competitions and a non-contact flag football game.)	2	Jaire Alexander (2)	Cornerback	
2022	2023	2	Elgton Jenkins (2)	Guard	
2023	2024	1	Kenny Clark (3)	Defensive tackle	
2024	2025	3	Rashan Gary (1)	Defensive end	
2024	2025	3	Josh Jacobs (1)	Running back	
2024	2025	3	Xavier McKinney (1)	Safety	
2025	2026	2	Keisean Nixon (1)	Cornerback	
2025	2026	2	Micah Parsons (1)	Defensive end	

== Most selections ==
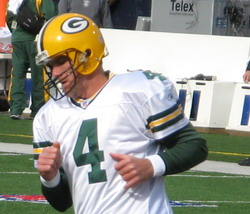
Brett Favre was chosen for nine Pro Bowls during the 1990s and 2000s, tying him with Forrest Gregg for the second most selections.

Green Bay Packers players with the most Pro Bowl selections while part of the team
Selections	Player	Position	Pro Bowls	Refs
10	Aaron Rodgers	Quarterback	2010, 2012, 2013, 2015, 2016, 2017, 2019, 2020, 2021, 2022	
9	Brett Favre	Quarterback	1993, 1994, 1996, 1997, 1998, 2002, 2003, 2004, 2008	
9	Forrest Gregg	Tackle	1960, 1961, 1962, 1963, 1964, 1965, 1966, 1968, 1969	
8	Willie Wood	Safety	1963, 1965, 1966, 1967, 1968, 1969, 1970, 1971	
7	James Lofton	Wide receiver	1979, 1981, 1982, 1983, 1984, 1985, 1986	
7	Jim Ringo	Center	1958, 1959, 1960, 1961, 1962, 1963, 1964	
6	Clay Matthews III	Linebacker	2010, 2011, 2012, 2013, 2015, 2016	
6	Reggie White	Defensive end	1994, 1995, 1996, 1997, 1998, 1999	
5	Davante Adams	Wide receiver	2018, 2019, 2020, 2021, 2022	
5	Herb Adderley	Defensive tackle	1964, 1965, 1966, 1967, 1968	
5	Willie Davis	Defensive end	1964, 1965, 1966, 1967, 1968	
5	Gale Gillingham	Guard	1970, 1971, 1972, 1974, 1975	
5	Sterling Sharpe	Wide receiver	1989, 1990, 1992, 1993, 1994	
5	Jim Taylor	Fullback	1961, 1962, 1963, 1964, 1965	

== See also ==
- Lists of Green Bay Packers players
