= Clemscott, Oklahoma =

Unincorporated community in Oklahoma, US

- Unincorporated community
- Location within Oklahoma Location within the United States
- Coordinates: 34°20′50″N 97°27′24″W
- Country: United States
- State: Oklahoma
- County: Carter
- Elevation: 938 ft (286 m)
- Time zone: UTC-6 (Central (CST))
  - Summer (DST): UTC-5 (CDT)
- Area code: 580
- GNIS feature ID: 1091452

Clemscott (also known as Clemscot) is an unincorporated community in Carter County, Oklahoma, United States. Clemscott is located on Oklahoma State Highway 53, 8.1 miles (13.0 km) north-northeast of Healdton. The community once had a post office.
