= Francis E. Ormsbee Jr. =

American naval aviator

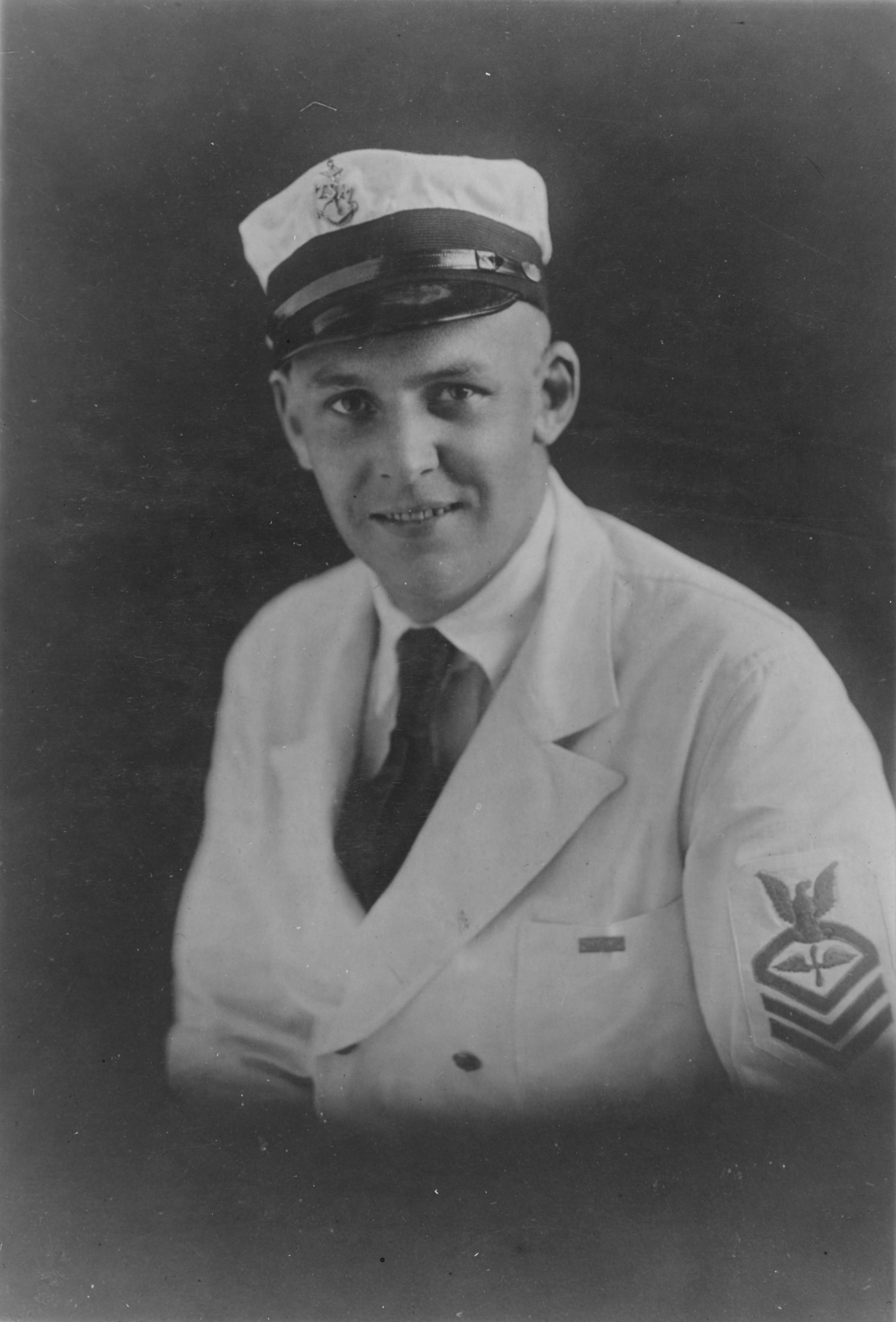
- Francis E. Ormsbee Jr. Medal of Honor recipient
- Born: April 30, 1892; Providence, Rhode Island, US
- Died: October 24, 1936 (aged 44); Near Woodford, Oklahoma, US
- Military career
- Allegiance: United States
- Branch: United States Navy
- Service years: 1917 - 1929
- Rank: Chief Machinist's Mate
- Nickname: Frank
- Conflicts: World War I
- Awards: Medal of Honor
- Other work: Federal Aeronautics Inspector

Francis "Frank" Edward Ormsbee Jr. (April 30, 1892 to October 24, 1936) was an American naval aviator serving in the U.S. Navy during World War I. He received the Medal of Honor for bravery.

== Biography ==
After growing up in Rhode Island, Ormsbee joined the United States Navy in 1917. He was serving at Naval Air Station Pensacola in Florida in 1918 when he rescued a gunner from a downed aircraft at great personal risk. He was awarded the Navy Cross, which was later upgraded to the Medal of Honor. It is worth noting that several sources state that Ormsbee was not a pilot at the time of this incident, but rather a member of the aircrew. He would go on to earn his wings in 1920, receiving the Naval Aviation Number "NAP-25". His brother, Army Second Lieutenant Harry Selfridge Ormsbee, died in a crash just over a year before Frank qualified as a pilot in the Navy.

In 1929, Ormsbee was discharged from the Navy and worked in various private roles, including flying airmail in Central America. He was known for flying what was at the time the world's longest airmail route- Miami, Florida to Santiago, Chile. In 1931, he became a founding member of the Air Line Pilots Association and later joined the Bureau of Air Commerce in 1935, serving as Assistant Manager of the First Air Navigation Division, as well as a Patrol Pilot and Inspector, until his death in 1936.

== Medal of Honor citation ==
For extraordinary heroism while attached to the Naval Air Station, Pensacola, Fla., on 25 September 1918. While flying with Ens. J. A. Jova, Ormsbee saw a plane go into a tailspin and crash about three-quarters of a mile to the right. Having landed near by, Ormsbee lost no time in going overboard and made for the wreck, which was all under water except the 2 wing tips. He succeeded in partially extricating the gunner so that his head was out of water, and held him in this position until the speedboat arrived. Ormsbee then made a number of desperate attempts to rescue the pilot, diving into the midst of the tangled wreckage although cut about the hands, but was too late to save his life.

== Death ==
Francis Ormsbee died in a plane crash while attempting to land to wait for bad weather to clear. On Saturday, October 24, 1936, while flying alone in heavily overcast conditions, Ormsbee crashed into a mountain north of Woodford, Oklahoma. His body was found along with the wreckage of his Curtiss Sedan the following day.

== See also ==
- List of Medal of Honor recipients
- List of Medal of Honor recipients for World War I
