= Wirt, Oklahoma =

Unincorporated community in Oklahoma, US

Wirt
- Unincorporated community
- Location within the state of Oklahoma Wirt (the United States)
- Coordinates: 34°13′51″N 97°31′54″W
- Country: United States
- State: Oklahoma
- County: Carter
- Elevation: 965 ft (294 m)
- Time zone: UTC-6 (Central (CST))
  - Summer (DST): UTC-5 (CDT)
- GNIS feature ID: 1099928

Wirt is an unincorporated community in Carter County, Oklahoma, United States, approximately three miles west of Healdton. First called Ragtown because of the tents the oil workers lived in when the petroleum boom started, the town was formally named after Wirt Franklin, who was in the oil business and drilled the first local well. The community post office began operations on December 12, 1914. At its peak, the town had a school, movie theater, bank, drug store, two gas stations, two churches, and two groceries. But the town burned several times, and the population declined when the oil boom ended.
