= Woodford, Oklahoma =

Unincorporated community in Oklahoma, US

Woodford
- Unincorporated community
- Location within the state of Oklahoma Woodford (the United States)
- Coordinates: 34°20′19″N 97°17′04″W
- Country: United States
- State: Oklahoma
- County: Carter
- Elevation: 929 ft (283 m)
- Time zone: UTC-6 (Central (CST))
  - Summer (DST): UTC-5 (CDT)
- GNIS feature ID: 1099983

Woodford is an unincorporated community located in Carter County, Oklahoma, United States. The townsite plat and cemetery are located within Section 34, Township 2 South, Range 1 West of the Indian Meridian. The zipcode is 73401. Woodford has its own telephone exchange, serviced by the Chickasaw Telephone Company. The Woodford area had its own school district in the past, but it was closed as the community dwindled in population. Students in the area today attend school in the nearby towns of Springer, Lone Grove, or Fox.

The Woodford Shale, a prominent oil and gas source rock and unconventional reservoir across the Midcontinent and Permian Basin, which outcrops nearby, was named for the community.

== History ==
A post office was established at Woodford, Indian Territory on February 4, 1884. It was named for Noah L. Woodford, a prominent Chickasaw Indian.

At the time of its founding, Woodford was located in Pickens County, Chickasaw Nation.

A history of Woodford was compiled by the Oklahoma history class at Woodford High School in 1930 (unpublished manuscript).

The population of Woodford had already started to decline by 1930. In 1940, the census enumerated 138 residents. The school district and at least one church closed in the 1950s. The last remaining store closed in the late 1980s. The community still supports a volunteer fire department, however. Woodford is included in the book "Ghost Towns of Oklahoma".
