= Gene Autry, Oklahoma =

Town in Oklahoma, US

- Town
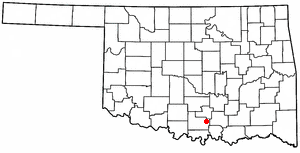
- Location of Gene Autry, Oklahoma
- Coordinates: 34°18′54″N 97°02′18″W
- Country: United States
- State: Oklahoma
- County: Carter

Area
  - Total: 4.11 sq mi (10.65 km^{2})
  - Land: 4.04 sq mi (10.47 km^{2})
  - Water: 0.069 sq mi (0.18 km^{2})
- Elevation: 843 ft (257 m)

Population (2020)
  - Total: 154
  - Density: 38.1/sq mi (14.71/km^{2})
- Time zone: UTC-6 (Central (CST))
  - Summer (DST): UTC-5 (CDT)
- ZIP code: 73436
- Area code: 580
- FIPS code: 40-28950
- GNIS feature ID: 2412674

Gene Autry is a town in Carter County, Oklahoma, United States. Its population was 154 at the time of the 2020 census, down just slightly from the 158 reported in the 2010 census. It is part of the Ardmore, Oklahoma Micropolitan Statistical Area.

== History ==
The town was originally named "Lou" by C.C. Henderson for his wife; the post office was established July 11, 1883. At the time of its founding, the community was located in Pickens County, Chickasaw Nation. On November 22, 1883, it was renamed "Dresden". The name was changed to "Berwyn" on September 1, 1887, after Berwyn, Pennsylvania, making the Oklahoma town one of several along the Santa Fe railroad line through the Territory (re)named for stations on the "Main Line" of the Pennsylvania Railroad.

Finally, on November 16, 1941, it was renamed "Gene Autry" to honor the singer and motion picture star. Though Autry was born in Tioga, Texas, his family moved to Oklahoma while he was an infant. He was raised in the southern Oklahoma towns of Achille and Ravia. Autry had also worked as a telegraph operator near Berwyn. In 1939, he bought the 1,200-acre (4.9 km^{2}) Flying A Ranch on the west edge of Berwyn, and the town decided to honor him by changing its name. About 35,000 people attended the ceremonies broadcast live from the site on Autry's Melody Ranch radio show. Expectations that Autry would make his permanent home on the ranch were heightened when Autry's house in California burned down just eight days before the name change ceremony, but were dashed 21 days after the ceremony with the attack on Pearl Harbor. Autry joined the military in 1942. He sold the ranch after the war. The ranch is now all but gone.

== Geography ==
Gene Autry is located in northeastern Carter County and is bordered to the north by Murray County. A portion of the city of Ardmore, separate from the main part of the city, borders Gene Autry to the east and contains the Ardmore Municipal Airport. The center of Ardmore is 15 miles (24 km) southwest of Gene Autry by highways 53 and 77. The Chickasaw National Recreation Area is to the north.

According to the United States Census Bureau, the town has a total area of 4.1 square miles (10.7 km^{2}), of which 0.08 square miles (0.2 km^{2}), or 1.72%, is covered by water. The town's area has expanded significantly to the north of its original location since the 2000 census, when it was 0.3 square miles (0.78 km^{2}), all land. The Washita River cuts across the northeast corner of the town, flowing southeast toward Lake Texoma on the Texas border.

=== Climate ===
Climate data for Gene Autry, Oklahoma
Month	Jan	Feb	Mar	Apr	May	Jun	Jul	Aug	Sep	Oct	Nov	Dec	Year
Mean daily maximum °F (°C)	53.1 (11.7)	58.5 (14.7)	67.7 (19.8)	76.5 (24.7)	82.9 (28.3)	89.9 (32.2)	95.1 (35.1)	95.0 (35.0)	87.3 (30.7)	77.9 (25.5)	65.7 (18.7)	55.8 (13.2)	75.5 (24.2)
Mean daily minimum °F (°C)	30.4 (−0.9)	34.4 (1.3)	43.2 (6.2)	53.0 (11.7)	61.0 (16.1)	68.7 (20.4)	72.9 (22.7)	71.8 (22.1)	65.0 (18.3)	54.3 (12.4)	43.3 (6.3)	33.6 (0.9)	52.6 (11.4)
Average precipitation inches (mm)	1.5 (38)	2.0 (51)	3.1 (79)	3.5 (89)	5.0 (130)	3.9 (99)	2.1 (53)	2.5 (64)	4.2 (110)	3.8 (97)	2.4 (61)	1.9 (48)	35.9 (910)
Source 1: weather.com
Source 2: Weatherbase.com

== Demographics ==
Historical population
Census	Pop.	Note	%±
1900	276		—
1910	378		37.0%
1920	435		15.1%
1930	300		−31.0%
1940	227		−24.3%
1950	170		−25.1%
1960	110		−35.3%
1970	120		9.1%
1980	178		48.3%
1990	97		−45.5%
2000	99		2.1%
2010	158		59.6%
2020	154		−2.5%
U.S. Decennial Census

=== 2020 census ===
As of the 2020 census, Gene Autry had a population of 154. The median age was 49.6 years. 14.3% of residents were under the age of 18 and 26.0% of residents were 65 years of age or older. For every 100 females there were 97.4 males, and for every 100 females age 18 and over there were 103.1 males age 18 and over.

0.0% of residents lived in urban areas, while 100.0% lived in rural areas.

There were 62 households in Gene Autry, of which 37.1% had children under the age of 18 living in them. Of all households, 40.3% were married-couple households, 25.8% were households with a male householder and no spouse or partner present, and 17.7% were households with a female householder and no spouse or partner present. About 16.2% of all households were made up of individuals and 6.5% had someone living alone who was 65 years of age or older.

There were 75 housing units, of which 17.3% were vacant. The homeowner vacancy rate was 0.0% and the rental vacancy rate was 0.0%.

Racial composition as of the 2020 census
Race	Number	Percent
White	94	61.0%
Black or African American	8	5.2%
American Indian and Alaska Native	20	13.0%
Asian	0	0.0%
Native Hawaiian and Other Pacific Islander	0	0.0%
Some other race	15	9.7%
Two or more races	17	11.0%
Hispanic or Latino (of any race)	10	6.5%

=== 2000 census ===
As of the 2000 census, 99 people, 46 households, and 25 families resided in the town. The population density was 362.7 inhabitants per square mile (140.0/km^{2}). The 55 housing units had an average density of 201.5 per square mile (77.8/km^{2}). The racial makeup of the town was 78.79% White, 5.05% African American, 7.07% Native American, 1.01% Asian, 5.05% from other races, and 3.03% from two or more races. Hispanics or Latinos of any race were 8.08% of the population.

Of the 46 households, 23.9% had children under 18 living with them, 50.0% were married couples living together, 6.5% had a female householder with no husband present, and 43.5% were not families. About 37.0% of all households were made up of individuals, and 19.6% had someone living alone who was 65 or older. The average household size was 2.15 and the average family size was 2.88.

In the town, the age distribution was 20.2% under the age of 18, 5.1% from 18 to 24, 32.3% from 25 to 44, 26.3% from 45 to 64, and 16.2% who were 65 years of age or older. The median age was 40 years. For every 100 females, there were 115.2 males. For every 100 females age 18 and over, there were 113.5 males.

The median income for a household in the town was $16,667, and the median income for a family was $20,833. Males had a median income of $31,000 versus $13,750 for females. The per capita income for the town was $8,295. There were 27.3% of families and 30.0% of the population living below the poverty line, including 39.3% of those under 18 and 22.2% of those over 64.

== Arts and culture ==
The Gene Autry Oklahoma Museum features Gene Autry-related themes, Western-themed entertainers, and local history.
