= Glenn, Oklahoma =

Unincorporated community in Oklahoma, US

Glenn
- Unincorporated community
- Location within the state of Oklahoma Glenn (the United States)
- Coordinates: 34°19′04″N 97°11′44″W
- Country: United States
- State: Oklahoma
- County: Carter
- Elevation: 896 ft (273 m)
- Time zone: UTC-6 (Central (CST))
  - Summer (DST): UTC-5 (CDT)
- GNIS feature ID: 1763558

Glenn is an unincorporated community located in Carter County, Oklahoma, United States. It is about 13 miles north-northwest of Ardmore, being west of Interstate 35 via Brooks Rd., and then north on Horse Apple Rd. The locale is old enough to appear on a 1911 Rand McNally map of the county.
