= Billy Grimes =

American football player (1927–2005)

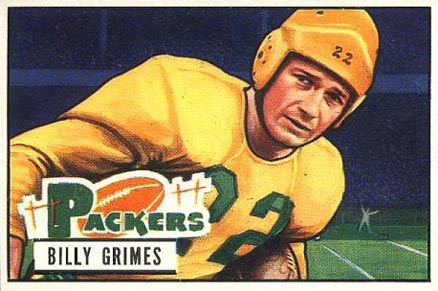

No. 85, 22
- Position: Halfback

Personal information
- Born: July 27, 1927; Countyline, Oklahoma, U.S.
- Died: March 26, 2005 (aged 77); Oklahoma City, Oklahoma, U.S.
- Listed height: 6 ft 1 in (1.85 m)
- Listed weight: 195 lb (88 kg)

Career information
- College: Oklahoma State (1945, 1947–1948)
- NFL draft: 1949: 2nd round, 20th overall pick

Career history
- Los Angeles Dons (1949); Green Bay Packers (1950–1952); Hamilton Tiger-Cats (1953)

Awards and highlights
- 2× Pro Bowl (1950, 1951)

Career NFL/AAFC statistics
- Rushing yards: 1,091
- Rushing average: 4.8
- Receptions: 45
- Receiving yards: 620
- Total touchdowns: 16
- Stats at Pro Football Reference

William Joseph Grimes (July 27, 1927 – March 26, 2005) was an American professional football player who was a running back for three seasons in the National Football League (NFL). He played college football for the Oklahoma State Cowboys.

== Career ==
Grimes played college football at Oklahoma State University. He was selected 20th overall in the second round of the 1949 NFL draft by the Chicago Bears, but instead played for the Los Angeles Dons of the All-America Football Conference. The following year he entered the NFL when he was selected by the Green Bay Packers in the 1950 AAFC dispersal draft. Grimes played for the Packers three years and went to the Pro Bowl after the 1950 and 1951 seasons.
