= Newport, Oklahoma =

Unincorporated community in Oklahoma, US

Newport
- Unincorporated community
- Location within the state of Oklahoma Newport (the United States)
- Coordinates: 34°15′10″N 97°16′29″W
- Country: United States
- State: Oklahoma
- County: Carter
- Elevation: 869 ft (265 m)
- Time zone: UTC-6 (Central (CST))
  - Summer (DST): UTC-5 (CDT)
- GNIS feature ID: 1095863

Newport is an unincorporated community located in Carter County, Oklahoma, United States. It is about 13 miles northwest of Ardmore off US Route 70 on Newport Rd. The locale is old enough to appear on a 1911 Rand McNally map of the county.
