= Milo, Oklahoma =

Unincorporated community in Oklahoma, US

- Unincorporated community
- Location within the state of Oklahoma Milo (the United States)
- Coordinates: 34°19′57″N 97°20′22″W
- Country: United States
- State: Oklahoma
- County: Carter
- Elevation: 892 ft (272 m)

Population (2000)
  - Total: Approx 150 people
- Time zone: UTC-6 (Central (CST))
  - Summer (DST): UTC-5 (CDT)
- ZIP codes: 73401
- GNIS feature ID: 1095425

Milo is a community located in Carter County, Oklahoma, United States. It is on State Highway 53, south of the Arbuckles. The post office opened October 28, 1899. It was later closed. The current ZIP Code is 73458 assigned to Springer. Milo is said to have been a portmanteau of the initials of the four daughters of resident J.W. Johnston. However his (5) daughters were named May Belle, Willie Mallissa, Lola Maude, Ezella Marigold, & Elba aka "Cutchie" Milo was once home to not only several schools, but two grocery stores, a cotton gin, and several other businesses. Milo has been a Farming & Ranching community for many years, with a very rich history, but like many small towns over the years its population has declined. Milo still prides itself on being a small rural community and is also the town where Norman Cattle Co. and the Speake Ranch are located.
