= Cheek, Oklahoma =

Unincorporated community in Oklahoma, US

Cheek
- Unincorporated community
- Location within the state of Oklahoma Cheek (the United States)
- Coordinates: 34°04′42″N 97°16′57″W
- Country: United States
- State: Oklahoma
- County: Carter
- Elevation: 814 ft (248 m)
- Time zone: UTC-6 (Central (CST))
  - Summer (DST): UTC-5 (CDT)
- GNIS feature ID: 1100287

Cheek is an unincorporated community located in Carter County, Oklahoma, United States. It is about 14 miles southwest of Ardmore. The locale is old enough to appear on a 1911 Rand McNally map of the county.
