= Dundee, Oklahoma =

Unincorporated community in Oklahoma, US

- Unincorporated community
- Location within Oklahoma Location within the United States
- Coordinates: 34°13′52″N 97°32′42″W
- Country: United States
- State: Oklahoma
- County: Carter
- Elevation: 984 ft (300 m)
- Time zone: UTC-6 (Central (CST))
  - Summer (DST): UTC-5 (CDT)
- Area code: 580
- GNIS feature ID: 1100371

Dundee is an unincorporated community in Carter County, Oklahoma, United States. The community has also been called McMan. The McMan post office opened in 1916 and closed in 1966.
