= Alpers, Oklahoma =

Unincorporated community in Oklahoma, US

Alpers
- Unincorporated community
- Location within the state of Oklahoma Alpers (the United States)
- Coordinates: 34°29′33″N 97°23′14″W
- Country: United States
- State: Oklahoma
- County: Carter
- Elevation: 965 ft (294 m)
- Time zone: UTC-6 (Central (CST))
  - Summer (DST): UTC-5 (CDT)
- GNIS feature ID: 1100170

Alpers is an unincorporated community in Carter County, Oklahoma, United States. A post office operated in Alpers from July 15, 1918, to November 14, 1931.
