= Brock, Oklahoma =

Unincorporated community in Oklahoma, US

Brock
- Unincorporated community
- Location within the state of Oklahoma Brock (the United States)
- Coordinates: 34°06′57″N 97°14′22″W
- Country: United States
- State: Oklahoma
- County: Carter
- Elevation: 922 ft (281 m)
- Time zone: UTC-6 (Central (CST))
  - Summer (DST): UTC-5 (CDT)
- GNIS feature ID: 1090507

Brock is an unincorporated community located in Carter County, Oklahoma, United States. It is about 9 miles southwest of Ardmore. The locale is old enough to appear on a 1911 Rand McNally map of the county.
