= Baum, Oklahoma =

Unincorporated community in Oklahoma, US

Baum
- Unincorporated community
- Location within the state of Oklahoma Baum (the United States)
- Coordinates: 34°16′05″N 96°58′51″W
- Country: United States
- State: Oklahoma
- County: Carter
- Elevation: 719 ft (219 m)
- Time zone: UTC-6 (Central (CST))
  - Summer (DST): UTC-5 (CDT)
- GNIS feature ID: 1089889

Baum is an unincorporated community in Carter County, Oklahoma, United States. It is about 17 miles northeast of Ardmore off US Route 177. The town was formerly known as Boland. The post office name was changed to Baum on September 18, 1894 and the office closed on March 15, 1918.
