= Oil City, Oklahoma =

Unincorporated community in Oklahoma, US

- an incorporated community
- Location within the state of Oklahoma Oil City (the United States)
- Coordinates: 34°16′28″N 97°25′5″W
- Country: United States
- State: Oklahoma
- County: Carter
- Elevation: 955 ft (291 m)
- Time zone: UTC-6 (Central (CST))
  - Summer (DST): UTC-5 (CDT)
- GNIS feature ID: 1100687

Oil City is a small unincorporated community in Carter County, Oklahoma, United States, located 22 miles northwest of Ardmore. The community was established in 1896.

Oil City was originally named Wheeler, but the name of its post office was officially changed on October 15, 1909. Despite the name, the community was home to several cotton farms and even a brick foundry. The name Oil City came to be due to the crude that would bubble up to the surface. The area was a stop for a wagon trail going to Ardmore. In 2005, a land spout injured two.

In 1965, the population of Oil City was 25 people. The post office closed on January 5, 1930.
