= Caldwell Hill, Oklahoma =

Unincorporated community in Oklahoma, US

Caldwell Hill
- Unincorporated community
- Location within the state of Oklahoma Caldwell Hill (the United States)
- Coordinates: 34°11′14″N 97°00′59″W
- Country: United States
- State: Oklahoma
- County: Carter
- Elevation: 827 ft (252 m)
- Time zone: UTC-6 (Central (CST))
  - Summer (DST): UTC-5 (CDT)
- GNIS feature ID: 1090806

Caldwell Hill is an unincorporated community located in Carter County, Oklahoma, United States.
