= Rexroat, Oklahoma =

Unincorporated community in Oklahoma, US

Rexroat
- Unincorporated community
- Location within the state of Oklahoma Rexroat (the United States)
- Coordinates: 34°12′59″N 97°24′17″W
- Country: United States
- State: Oklahoma
- County: Carter
- Elevation: 879 ft (268 m)
- Time zone: UTC-6 (Central (CST))
  - Summer (DST): UTC-5 (CDT)
- GNIS feature ID: 1100786

Rexroat is an unincorporated community located in Carter County, Oklahoma, United States.
