= Dillard, Oklahoma =

Unincorporated community in Oklahoma, US

Dillard
- Unincorporated community
- Location within the state of Oklahoma Dillard (the United States)
- Coordinates: 34°11′14″N 97°24′17″W
- Country: United States
- State: Oklahoma
- County: Carter
- Elevation: 902 ft (275 m)
- Time zone: UTC-6 (Central (CST))
  - Summer (DST): UTC-5 (CDT)
- GNIS feature ID: 1100354

Dillard is an unincorporated community located in Carter County, Oklahoma, United States.
