= Hewitt, Oklahoma =

Unincorporated community in Oklahoma, US

Hewitt
- Unincorporated community
- Location within the state of Oklahoma Hewitt (the United States)
- Coordinates: 34°10′08″N 97°24′17″W
- Country: United States
- State: Oklahoma
- County: Carter
- Elevation: 909 ft (277 m)
- Time zone: UTC-6 (Central (CST))
  - Summer (DST): UTC-5 (CDT)
- GNIS feature ID: 1100489

Hewitt is an unincorporated community located in Carter County, Oklahoma, United States. It is about 15 miles west of Ardmore, being off US Route 70 on Dillard Rd., located around the east boundary of the present-day City of Wilson, Oklahoma. The locale is old enough to appear on a 1911 Rand McNally map of the county. (The larger Wilson was not established until 1914, the same year it was reached by railroad.)
