= Provence, Oklahoma =

Unincorporated community in Oklahoma, US

Provence
- Unincorporated community
- Location within the state of Oklahoma Provence (the United States)
- Coordinates: 34°09′04″N 97°01′15″W
- Country: United States
- State: Oklahoma
- County: Carter
- Elevation: 883 ft (269 m)
- Time zone: UTC-6 (Central (CST))
  - Summer (DST): UTC-5 (CDT)
- GNIS feature ID: 1100766

Provence is an unincorporated community located in Carter County, Oklahoma, United States. It is about 8 miles east of Ardmore off Springdale Road, which becomes 9th Ave SE. The locale is old enough to appear on a 1911 Rand McNally map of the county.
