= Reck, Oklahoma =

Unincorporated community in Oklahoma, US

Reck
- Unincorporated community
- Location within the state of Oklahoma Reck (the United States)
- Coordinates: 34°06′22″N 97°28′27″W
- Country: United States
- State: Oklahoma
- County: Carter
- Elevation: 994 ft (303 m)
- Time zone: UTC-6 (Central (CST))
  - Summer (DST): UTC-5 (CDT)
- GNIS feature ID: 2582268

Reck is an historical unincorporated community located in Carter County, Oklahoma, United States. It is about 24 miles west-southwest of Ardmore off US Highway 70 on Reck Rd. The locale is old enough to appear on a 1911 Rand McNally map of the county.
