= Countyline, Oklahoma =

Unincorporated community in Oklahoma, US

- Unincorporated community
- Location within the state of Oklahoma Countyline (the United States)
- Coordinates: 34°26′55″N 97°33′46″W
- Country: United States
- State: Oklahoma
- County: Carter and Stephens
- Elevation: 1,053 ft (321 m)
- Time zone: UTC-6 (Central (CST))
  - Summer (DST): UTC-5 (CDT)
- ZIP codes: 73425
- Area code: 580
- GNIS feature ID: 1091753

Countyline, or County Line, is a rural unincorporated community on the Stephens–Carter county line in south central Oklahoma, United States. It is north of State Highway 7. The post office opened June 29, 1928.
