= Springer, Oklahoma =

Town in Oklahoma, US

- Town
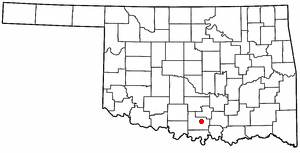
- Location of Springer, Oklahoma
- Coordinates: 34°17′28″N 97°07′31″W
- Country: United States
- State: Oklahoma
- County: Carter

Area
  - Total: 15.12 sq mi (39.16 km^{2})
  - Land: 14.92 sq mi (38.64 km^{2})
  - Water: 0.20 sq mi (0.52 km^{2})
- Elevation: 850 ft (260 m)

Population (2020)
  - Total: 685
  - Density: 45.9/sq mi (17.73/km^{2})
- Time zone: UTC-6 (Central (CST))
  - Summer (DST): UTC-5 (CDT)
- ZIP code: 73458
- Area code: 580
- FIPS code: 40-69500
- GNIS feature ID: 2413322

Springer is a town in Carter County, Oklahoma, United States. As of the 2020 census, the community had 685 residents. It is part of the Ardmore, Oklahoma Micropolitan Statistical Area.

== History ==
A post office was established at Springer, Indian Territory on September 1, 1890. It was named for W.A. Springer, a pioneer rancher and cattleman.

At the time of its founding, Springer was located in Pickens County, Chickasaw Nation.

== Geography ==
Springer is located northeast of the center of Carter County. U.S. Route 77 passes through the center of town, and Interstate 35 runs along the western edge, with access from Exits 40 (Brooks Road) and 42 (State Highway 53). Ardmore, the Carter County seat, is 10 miles (16 km) to the south, and Davis is 14 miles (23 km) to the north.

According to the United States Census Bureau, the town of Springer has a total area of 15.1 square miles (39.2 km^{2}), of which 14.9 square miles (38.7 km^{2}) is land and 0.19 square miles (0.5 km^{2}), or 1.32%, is water. The town is located just south of the Arbuckle Mountains.

== Demographics ==
Historical population
Census	Pop.	Note	%±
1960	212		—
1970	256		20.8%
1980	679		165.2%
1990	485		−28.6%
2000	204		−57.9%
2010	700		243.1%
2020	685		−2.1%
U.S. Decennial Census

=== 2020 census ===
As of the 2020 census, Springer had a population of 685. The median age was 44.9 years. 23.6% of residents were under the age of 18 and 24.7% of residents were 65 years of age or older. For every 100 females there were 110.8 males, and for every 100 females age 18 and over there were 112.6 males age 18 and over.

0.0% of residents lived in urban areas, while 100.0% lived in rural areas.

There were 270 households in Springer, of which 38.1% had children under the age of 18 living in them. Of all households, 45.9% were married-couple households, 20.0% were households with a male householder and no spouse or partner present, and 24.4% were households with a female householder and no spouse or partner present. About 24.4% of all households were made up of individuals and 13.7% had someone living alone who was 65 years of age or older.

There were 308 housing units, of which 12.3% were vacant. The homeowner vacancy rate was 1.0% and the rental vacancy rate was 0.0%.

Racial composition as of the 2020 census
Race	Number	Percent
White	425	62.0%
Black or African American	26	3.8%
American Indian and Alaska Native	72	10.5%
Asian	0	0.0%
Native Hawaiian and Other Pacific Islander	1	0.1%
Some other race	63	9.2%
Two or more races	98	14.3%
Hispanic or Latino (of any race)	20	2.9%

=== 2000 census ===
As of the 2000 census, there were 577 people, 237 households, and 181 families residing in the town. The population density was 39.9 inhabitants per square mile (15.4/km^{2}). There were 267 housing units at an average density of 18.5 per square mile (7.1/km^{2}). The racial makeup of the town was 84.92% White, 2.60% African American, 7.11% Native American, 1.39% from other races, and 3.99% from two or more races. Hispanic or Latino of any race were 4.01% of the population.

There were 237 households, out of which 26.6% had children under the age of 18 living with them, 66.2% were married couples living together, 7.6% had a female householder with no husband present, and 23.6% were non-families. 21.9% of all households were made up of individuals, and 13.5% had someone living alone who was 65 years of age or older. The average household size was 2.43 and the average family size was 2.83.

In the town, the population was spread out, with 23.6% under the age of 18, 7.3% from 18 to 24, 24.6% from 25 to 44, 28.9% from 45 to 64, and 15.6% who were 65 years of age or older. The median age was 40 years. For every 100 females, there were 94.3 males. For every 100 females age 18 and over, there were 90.9 males.

The median income for a household in the town was $32,000, and the median income for a family was $35,375. Males had a median income of $35,500 versus $18,864 for females. The per capita income for the town was $15,640. About 7.0% of families and 7.9% of the population were below the poverty line, including 13.2% of those under age 18 and 9.9% of those age 65 or over.
