= Carter County, Oklahoma =

County in Oklahoma, United States

- County
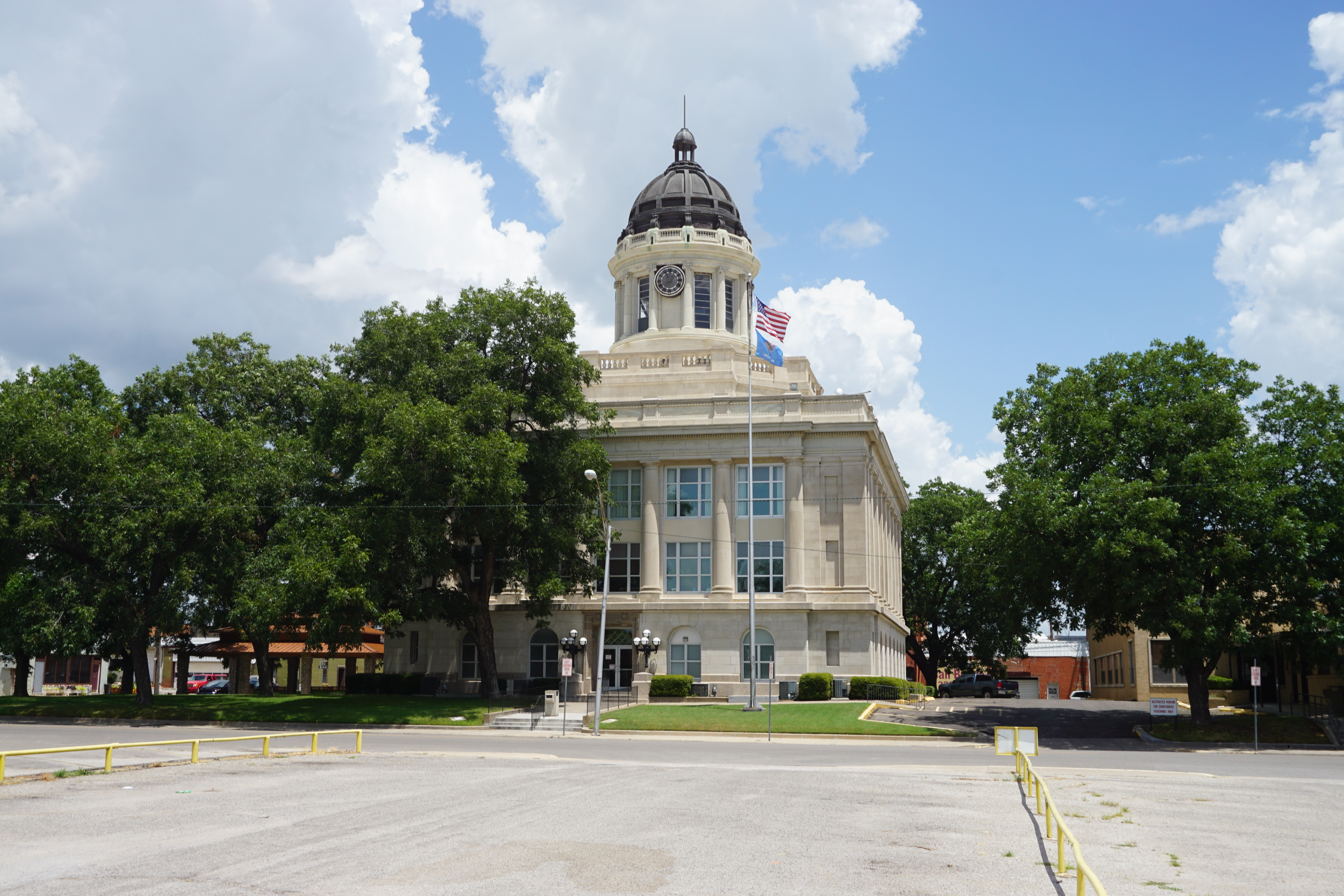
- Carter County Courthouse in Ardmore

- Location within the U.S. state of Oklahoma
- Coordinates: 34°15′N 97°17′W
- Country: United States
- State: Oklahoma
- Founded: 1907
- Named for: Ben W. Carter
- Seat: Ardmore
- Largest city: Ardmore

Area
  - Total: 834 sq mi (2,160 km^{2})
  - Land: 822 sq mi (2,130 km^{2})
  - Water: 12 sq mi (31 km^{2}) 1.4%

Population (2020)
  - Total: 48,003
  - Estimate (2025): 48,910 ▲
  - Density: 58/sq mi (22/km^{2})
- Time zone: UTC−6 (Central)
  - Summer (DST): UTC−5 (CDT)
- Congressional district: 4th
- Website: cartercountyok.us

Carter County is a county in the U.S. state of Oklahoma. As of the 2020 census, the population was 48,003. Its county seat is Ardmore. The county was named for Captain Ben W. Carter, a Cherokee who lived among the Chickasaw. Carter County is part of the Ardmore Micropolitan Statistical Area. It is also a part of the Texoma region.

== History ==
Prior to statehood, the present Carter County, Oklahoma, was part of Pickens County in the Chickasaw Nation of the Indian Territory.

After the Civil War, the government of the United States forced the Chickasaw government to allow railroads built across its territory. The Gulf, Colorado and Santa Fe Railway (controlled by the Atchison, Topeka and Santa Fe Railway, AT&SF) built a line north from Texas to Purcell.

In 1901-1903 the Arkansas and Choctaw Railway (acquired by the St. Louis and San Francisco Railway in 1907) built a line from Arkansas to Ardmore. Oil production spurred further railroad development. In 1913–14, the Oklahoma, New Mexico and Pacific Railway constructed a line from Ardmore west to Ringling. In 1916, the Ringling and Oil Fields Railway laid tracks north from Ringling Junction to Healdton. These last two rail lines were abandoned in 1976.

Oil and gas production began very early in the 20th century. The Healdton field opened in 1913, and led to the development of Ardmore as a major oil production center. However, a disastrous fire occurred in Ardmore in 1915, when a railroad car exploded, killing 43 people and destroying much of the downtown. Ardmore and the local oil industry recovered, and the city also became a manufacturing center. Akron Tire and Rubber Company built and operated a plant in Ardmore as early as 1915. In 1970, Uniroyal built a tire plant there. It was acquired by Michelin North America in 1990. By the start of the 21st century, manufacturing was the largest component of the county economy.

== Geography ==
According to the U.S. Census Bureau, the county has a total area of 834 square miles (2,160 km^{2}), of which 822 square miles (2,130 km^{2}) is land and 12 square miles (31 km^{2}) (1.4%) is water.

The county contains parts of several physiographic regions, including the Arbuckle Mountains, the Coastal Plains, the Red Bed plains and the Cross Timbers. The northern part of the county drains to the Washita River, while several creeks drain the southern part directly to the Red River.

=== Geology ===
The Healdton Field, encompassing Healdton and located in the western portion of Carter County, produces from the Pennsylvanian Healdton sands of the Hoxbar Group and the Ordovician massive carbonate Arbuckle Group. The field is located on the "Healdton uplift", a northwest–southeast trending anticline, which formed with the Wichita Orogeny, and is 8 miles long and up to 3 miles wide. This was followed by deposition of the Healdton sandstones and shales on pre-Pennsylvanian eroded rocks and subsequent folding during the Arbuckle Orogeny. A prospector named Palmer drilled a shallow well, 425 feet, near an oil seep in the 1890s but Federal Law prohibited oil development on "Indian lands" until the early 1900s. Therefore, the discovery of the field is credited to the drilling of No. 1 Wirt Franklin in 1913.

=== Major highways ===
- Interstate 35
- U.S. Highway 70
- U.S. Highway 70A
- U.S. Highway 77
- U.S. Highway 177
- State Highway 7
- State Highway 53
- State Highway 74
- State Highway 76
- State Highway 77S
- State Highway 142
- State Highway 199

=== Adjacent counties ===
- Garvin County (north)
- Murray County (northeast)
- Johnston County (east)
- Marshall County (southeast)
- Love County (south)
- Jefferson County (southwest)
- Stephens County (northwest)

== Demographics ==
Historical population
Census	Pop.	Note	%±
1910	25,358		—
1920	40,247		58.7%
1930	41,419		2.9%
1940	43,292		4.5%
1950	36,455		−15.8%
1960	39,044		7.1%
1970	37,349		−4.3%
1980	43,610		16.8%
1990	42,919		−1.6%
2000	45,621		6.3%
2010	47,557		4.2%
2020	48,003		0.9%
2025 (est.)	48,910	▲	1.9%
U.S. Decennial Census; 1790-1960 1900-1990; 1990-2000 2010

=== 2020 census ===
As of the 2020 United States census, the county had a population of 48,003. Of the residents, 23.6% were under the age of 18 and 19.7% were 65 years of age or older; the median age was 40.6 years. For every 100 females there were 96.6 males, and for every 100 females age 18 and over there were 94.4 males.

The racial makeup of the county was 66.9% White, 6.0% Black or African American, 9.2% American Indian and Alaska Native, 1.2% Asian, 4.2% from some other race, and 12.3% from two or more races. Hispanic or Latino residents of any race comprised 7.5% of the population.

There were 18,957 households in the county, of which 31.4% had children under the age of 18 living with them and 27.3% had a female householder with no spouse or partner present. About 28.1% of all households were made up of individuals and 12.6% had someone living alone who was 65 years of age or older.

There were 21,561 housing units, of which 12.1% were vacant. Among occupied housing units, 67.6% were owner-occupied and 32.4% were renter-occupied. The homeowner vacancy rate was 1.7% and the rental vacancy rate was 11.6%.

=== 2000 census ===
As of the census of 2000, there were 45,621 people, 17,992 households, and 12,648 families residing in the county. The population density was 55 inhabitants per square mile (21/km^{2}). There were 20,577 housing units at an average density of 25 units per square mile (9.7/km^{2}). The racial makeup of the county was 77.4% White, 7.60% Black or African American, 7.92% Native American, 0.60% Asian, 0.03% Pacific Islander, 1.13% from other races, and 4.45% from two or more races; 2.78% of the population were Hispanic or Latino of any race.

As of 2000, there were 17,992 households, out of which 32.50% had children under the age of 18 living with them, 54.50% were married couples living together, 12.00% had a female householder with no husband present, and 29.70% were non-families. 26.60% of all households were made up of individuals, and 12.20% had someone living alone who was 65 years of age or older. The average household size was 2.47 and the average family size was 2.98. In the county, the population was spread out, with 26.20% under the age of 18, 7.90% from 18 to 24, 26.70% from 25 to 44, 23.20% from 45 to 64, and 16.00% who were 65 years of age or older. The median age was 38 years. For every 100 females, there were 92.90 males. For every 100 females age 18 and over, there were 89.00 males.

In 2000, the median income for a household in the county was $29,405, and the median income for a family was $36,729. Males had a median income of $30,018 versus $20,877 for females. The per capita income for the county was $15,511. About 12.70% of families and 16.60% of the population were below the poverty line, including 21.70% of those under age 18 and 12.40% of those age 65 or over. Per 2021 census estimates, the county's median household income was $52,906 and it had a poverty rate of 14.2%.

== Politics ==
Voter Registration and Party Enrollment as of May 31, 2023
Party	Number of Voters	Percentage
Democratic	8,419	28.07%
Republican	15,656	52.20%
Others	5,919	19.73%
Total	29,994	100%

United States presidential election results for Carter County, Oklahoma
Year	Republican		Democratic		Third party(ies)	
Year	No.	%	No.	%	No.	%
1908	1,305	31.99%	2,181	53.46%	594	14.56%
1912	652	20.24%	1,860	57.75%	709	22.01%
1916	1,013	20.64%	2,949	60.09%	946	19.27%
1920	3,561	35.14%	5,997	59.18%	575	5.67%
1924	3,164	29.13%	7,134	65.68%	564	5.19%
1928	6,538	55.80%	5,086	43.41%	92	0.79%
1932	1,733	15.25%	9,633	84.75%	0	0.00%
1936	2,247	19.26%	9,387	80.44%	35	0.30%
1940	3,270	23.79%	10,441	75.96%	35	0.25%
1944	2,446	20.99%	9,184	78.81%	24	0.21%
1948	2,147	18.48%	9,474	81.52%	0	0.00%
1952	5,974	36.76%	10,276	63.24%	0	0.00%
1956	5,974	39.01%	9,341	60.99%	0	0.00%
1960	6,288	42.69%	8,441	57.31%	0	0.00%
1964	4,986	31.90%	10,645	68.10%	0	0.00%
1968	5,127	35.73%	5,807	40.47%	3,414	23.79%
1972	9,368	66.41%	4,577	32.45%	161	1.14%
1976	6,668	44.25%	8,319	55.20%	83	0.55%
1980	9,262	57.34%	6,509	40.29%	383	2.37%
1984	11,578	64.96%	6,161	34.57%	83	0.47%
1988	8,430	50.98%	7,988	48.31%	117	0.71%
1992	5,947	32.38%	7,171	39.04%	5,250	28.58%
1996	6,769	42.83%	6,979	44.16%	2,056	13.01%
2000	9,667	58.74%	6,659	40.46%	132	0.80%
2004	12,178	65.32%	6,466	34.68%	0	0.00%
2008	13,241	70.27%	5,603	29.73%	0	0.00%
2012	12,214	71.34%	4,908	28.66%	0	0.00%
2016	13,752	74.20%	4,002	21.59%	780	4.21%
2020	14,699	75.46%	4,470	22.95%	310	1.59%
2024	14,945	76.69%	4,277	21.95%	266	1.36%

== Communities ==
=== Cities ===
- Ardmore (county seat)
- Healdton
- Lone Grove
- Wilson

=== Towns ===
- Dickson
- Gene Autry
- Ratliff City
- Springer
- Tatums

=== Census-designated place ===
- Fox

=== Unincorporated communities ===
- Alpers
- Baum
- Brock
- Caldwell Hill
- Cheek
- Clemscott
- Countyline
- Dillard
- Dripping Springs
- Dundee
- Durwood
- Glenn
- Graham
- Hewitt
- Milo
- Newport
- Oil City
- Old Scott
- Pooleville
- Post Oak
- Provence
- Pruitt City
- Reck
- Rexroat
- Tussy
- Wirt
- Woodford
- Zaneis

== See also ==
- National Register of Historic Places listings in Carter County, Oklahoma
