= Graham, Oklahoma =

Unincorporated community in Oklahoma, US

Graham
- Unincorporated community
- Location within the state of Oklahoma
- Coordinates: 34°20′26″N 97°26′04″W
- Country: United States
- State: Oklahoma
- County: Carter
- Elevation: 929 ft (283 m)
- Time zone: UTC-6 (Central (CST))
  - Summer (DST): UTC-5 (CDT)
- GNIS feature ID: 1093291

Graham is an unincorporated community located in Carter County, Oklahoma, United States. According to the 2000 U.S. Census it had a population of 158.

== History ==
A post office was established at Graham, Indian Territory on June 16, 1891.

At the time of its founding, Graham was located in Pickens County, Chickasaw Nation.

== Notable people ==
Jim Weatherall – American football player. Played in the NFL for the Detroit Lions, Philadelphia Eagles, and Washington Redskins, as well as the Edmonton Eskimos of the WIFU. He played in college for Norman City College.
