= Fox, Oklahoma =

Unincorporated community in Oklahoma, US

- Unincorporated community
- Location within the state of Oklahoma Fox (the United States)
- Coordinates: 34°21′36″N 97°29′34″W
- Country: United States
- State: Oklahoma
- County: Carter

Area
  - Total: 0.58 sq mi (1.49 km^{2})
  - Land: 0.58 sq mi (1.49 km^{2})
  - Water: 0 sq mi (0.00 km^{2})
- Elevation: 994 ft (303 m)

Population (2020)
  - Total: 92
  - Density: 160.4/sq mi (61.92/km^{2})
- Time zone: UTC-6 (Central (CST))
  - Summer (DST): UTC-5 (CDT)
- FIPS code: 40-27550
- GNIS feature ID: 2805318

Fox is an unincorporated community in Carter County in southern Oklahoma, United States. As of the 2020 census, Fox had a population of 92. The post office was established January 25, 1894. It is named for Frank M. Fox of the Chickasaw Nation.

Robert L. Lynn, the president from 1975 to 1997 of Louisiana College in Pineville, Louisiana, graduated in 1949 from Fox High School.

== Demographics ==
Historical population
Census	Pop.	Note	%±
2020	92		—
U.S. Decennial Census

=== 2020 census ===
As of the 2020 census, Fox had a population of 92. The median age was 48.0 years. 17.4% of residents were under the age of 18 and 31.5% of residents were 65 years of age or older. For every 100 females there were 114.0 males, and for every 100 females age 18 and over there were 100.0 males age 18 and over.

0.0% of residents lived in urban areas, while 100.0% lived in rural areas.

There were 39 households in Fox, of which 20.5% had children under the age of 18 living in them. Of all households, 51.3% were married-couple households, 15.4% were households with a male householder and no spouse or partner present, and 28.2% were households with a female householder and no spouse or partner present. About 33.3% of all households were made up of individuals and 25.6% had someone living alone who was 65 years of age or older.

There were 52 housing units, of which 25.0% were vacant. The homeowner vacancy rate was 4.9% and the rental vacancy rate was 25.0%.

Racial composition as of the 2020 census
Race	Number	Percent
White	73	79.3%
Black or African American	0	0.0%
American Indian and Alaska Native	4	4.3%
Asian	2	2.2%
Native Hawaiian and Other Pacific Islander	0	0.0%
Some other race	2	2.2%
Two or more races	11	12.0%
Hispanic or Latino (of any race)	7	7.6%
