= Healdton, Oklahoma =

City in Oklahoma, US

- City
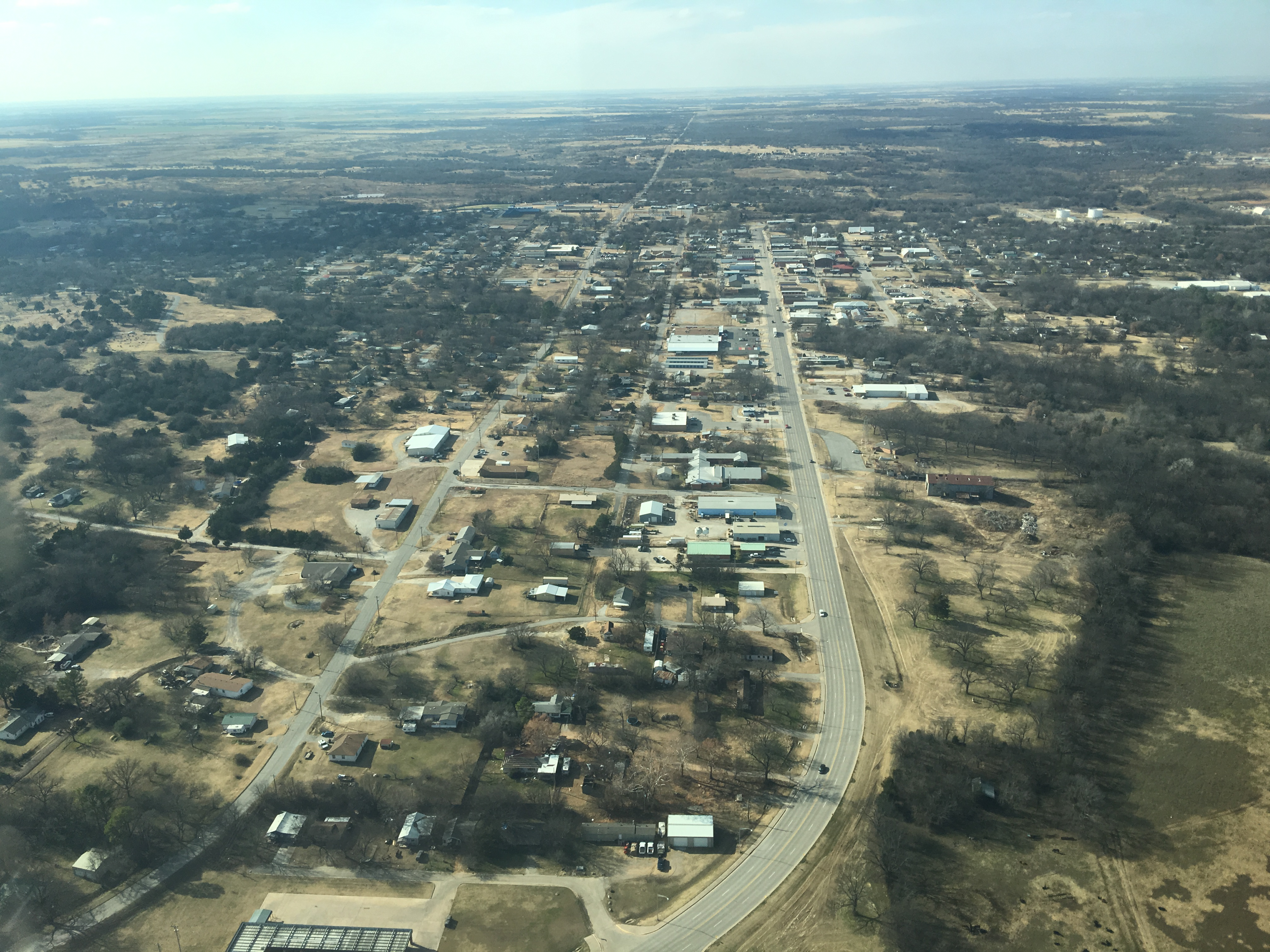
- Aerial view of Healdton, Oklahoma

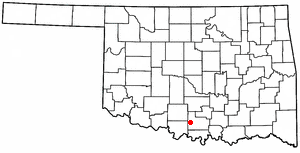
- Location of Healdton, Oklahoma
- Coordinates: 34°13′58″N 97°31′06″W
- Country: United States
- State: Oklahoma
- County: Carter

Area
  - Total: 14.38 sq mi (37.25 km^{2})
  - Land: 14.12 sq mi (36.56 km^{2})
  - Water: 0.27 sq mi (0.69 km^{2})
- Elevation: 951 ft (290 m)

Population (2020)
  - Total: 2,328
  - Density: 164.9/sq mi (63.68/km^{2})
- Time zone: UTC-6 (Central (CST))
  - Summer (DST): UTC-5 (CDT)
- ZIP code: 73438
- Area code: 580
- FIPS code: 40-33350
- GNIS feature ID: 2410727

Healdton is a city in Carter County, Oklahoma, United States. As of the 2020 census, Healdton had a population of 2,328. It is part of the Ardmore micropolitan statistical area .

== History ==
A post office was established at Healdton, Indian Territory, on February 26, 1883. It was named for Charles H. Heald, a prominent resident. At the time of its founding, Healdton was located in Pickens County, Chickasaw Nation. With the August 1913 discovery of oil in the Healdton field near the town, Healdton got rail service from the Ringling and Oil Fields Railway, an affiliate of the Oklahoma, New Mexico and Pacific Railway, in the 1916-1917 timeframe. That line was later acquired by an Atchison, Topeka and Santa Fe Railway affiliate, and was operated until abandoned in 1976.

== Geography ==
Healdton is located in western Carter County. Oklahoma State Highway 76 passes through the city, leading south 5 miles (8 km) to U.S. Route 70, west of Wilson and north 5 miles (8 km) to Oklahoma State Highway 53. Ardmore, the Carter County seat, is 23 miles (37 km) to the east via OK-76 and US-70.

According to the United States Census Bureau, Healdton has a total area of 14.4 square miles (37.3 km^{2}), of which 0.27 square miles (0.7 km^{2}), or 1.86%, is covered by water.

Healdton Municipal Lake, just northeast of Healdton, boasts 7 miles of shoreline and 370 surface acres.

=== Geology ===
The Healdton Field, encompassing Healdton and located in the western portion of Carter County, produces from the Pennsylvanian Healdton sands of the Hoxbar Group and the Ordovician massive carbonate Arbuckle Group. The field is located on the Healdton uplift, a northwest-southeast trending anticline, which formed with the Wichita Orogeny, and is 8 mi long and up to 3 mi wide. This was followed by deposition of the Healdton sandstones and shales on pre-Pennsylvanian eroded rocks and subsequent folding during the Arbuckle Orogeny. A prospector named Palmer drilled a shallow well, 425 feet, near an oil seep in the 1890s, but federal law prohibited oil development on "Indian lands" until the early 1900s. Therefore, the discovery of the field is credited to the drilling of No. 1 Wirt Franklin in 1913.

=== Climate ===
According to the Köppen Climate Classification system, Healdton has a humid subtropical climate, abbreviated "Cfa" on climate maps. The hottest temperature recorded in Healdton was 115 °F (46.1 °C) on August 2, 1896, while the coldest temperature recorded was −17 °F (−27.2 °C) on February 16, 2021.

Climate data for Healdton, Oklahoma, 1991–2020 normals, extremes 1894–present
Month	Jan	Feb	Mar	Apr	May	Jun	Jul	Aug	Sep	Oct	Nov	Dec	Year
Record high °F (°C)	90 (32)	94 (34)	99 (37)	98 (37)	102 (39)	114 (46)	112 (44)	115 (46)	111 (44)	101 (38)	90 (32)	83 (28)	115 (46)
Mean maximum °F (°C)	73.8 (23.2)	78.8 (26.0)	85.3 (29.6)	88.2 (31.2)	92.9 (33.8)	97.1 (36.2)	102.5 (39.2)	102.4 (39.1)	97.9 (36.6)	91.0 (32.8)	81.2 (27.3)	74.9 (23.8)	104.4 (40.2)
Mean daily maximum °F (°C)	52.6 (11.4)	57.1 (13.9)	65.1 (18.4)	73.8 (23.2)	80.8 (27.1)	89.2 (31.8)	94.7 (34.8)	94.6 (34.8)	86.7 (30.4)	76.2 (24.6)	64.4 (18.0)	54.3 (12.4)	74.1 (23.4)
Daily mean °F (°C)	39.6 (4.2)	44.0 (6.7)	51.9 (11.1)	60.4 (15.8)	69.1 (20.6)	77.6 (25.3)	82.1 (27.8)	81.5 (27.5)	73.6 (23.1)	62.3 (16.8)	50.9 (10.5)	41.6 (5.3)	61.2 (16.2)
Mean daily minimum °F (°C)	26.5 (−3.1)	30.9 (−0.6)	38.7 (3.7)	47.0 (8.3)	57.3 (14.1)	66.0 (18.9)	69.4 (20.8)	68.3 (20.2)	60.4 (15.8)	48.3 (9.1)	37.5 (3.1)	28.9 (−1.7)	48.3 (9.0)
Mean minimum °F (°C)	12.1 (−11.1)	16.5 (−8.6)	21.1 (−6.1)	31.4 (−0.3)	41.4 (5.2)	56.1 (13.4)	62.4 (16.9)	60.3 (15.7)	46.3 (7.9)	32.9 (0.5)	21.6 (−5.8)	14.3 (−9.8)	8.3 (−13.2)
Record low °F (°C)	−10 (−23)	−17 (−27)	1 (−17)	19 (−7)	24 (−4)	38 (3)	50 (10)	45 (7)	31 (−1)	10 (−12)	7 (−14)	−10 (−23)	−17 (−27)
Average precipitation inches (mm)	1.75 (44)	2.05 (52)	2.76 (70)	3.26 (83)	5.20 (132)	3.92 (100)	2.82 (72)	2.63 (67)	3.71 (94)	3.85 (98)	2.69 (68)	2.35 (60)	36.99 (940)
Average snowfall inches (cm)	0.6 (1.5)	0.5 (1.3)	0.1 (0.25)	0.0 (0.0)	0.0 (0.0)	0.0 (0.0)	0.0 (0.0)	0.0 (0.0)	0.0 (0.0)	0.0 (0.0)	0.2 (0.51)	0.8 (2.0)	2.2 (5.56)
Average precipitation days (≥ 0.01 in)	5.1	5.9	6.7	6.6	8.7	7.2	5.3	5.7	6.6	6.4	5.2	5.7	75.1
Average snowy days (≥ 0.1 in)	0.5	0.4	0.2	0.0	0.0	0.0	0.0	0.0	0.0	0.0	0.2	0.4	1.7
Source 1: NOAA
Source 2: National Weather Service

== Demographics ==
Historical population
Census	Pop.	Note	%±
1920	2,157		—
1930	2,017		−6.5%
1940	2,067		2.5%
1950	2,578		24.7%
1960	2,898		12.4%
1970	2,324		−19.8%
1980	3,769		62.2%
1990	2,872		−23.8%
2000	2,786		−3.0%
2010	2,788		0.1%
2020	2,328		−16.5%
U.S. Decennial Census

=== 2020 census ===
As of the 2020 census, Healdton had a population of 2,328. The median age was 39.6 years. 25.5% of residents were under the age of 18 and 18.3% of residents were 65 years of age or older. For every 100 females there were 90.8 males, and for every 100 females age 18 and over there were 88.6 males age 18 and over.

0% of residents lived in urban areas, while 100.0% lived in rural areas.

There were 960 households in Healdton, of which 33.1% had children under the age of 18 living in them. Of all households, 45.0% were married-couple households, 18.2% were households with a male householder and no spouse or partner present, and 29.5% were households with a female householder and no spouse or partner present. About 28.6% of all households were made up of individuals and 13.1% had someone living alone who was 65 years of age or older.

There were 1,163 housing units, of which 17.5% were vacant. Among occupied housing units, 69.1% were owner-occupied and 30.9% were renter-occupied. The homeowner vacancy rate was 1.9% and the rental vacancy rate was 8.0%.

Racial composition as of the 2020 census
Race	Percent
White	78.0%
Black or African American	0.8%
American Indian and Alaska Native	7.3%
Asian	0.3%
Native Hawaiian and Other Pacific Islander	0%
Some other race	2.0%
Two or more races	11.6%
Hispanic or Latino (of any race)	4.6%

=== 2000 census ===
As of the 2000 census, 2,786 people, 1,132 households, and 776 families were residing in the city. The population density was 197.4 inhabitants per square mile (76.2/km^{2}). The 1,369 housing units had an average density of 97.0 per square mile (37.5/km^{2}). The racial makeup of the city was 87.08% White, 0.93% African American, 7.47% Native American, 0.11% Asian, 0.90% from other races, and 3.52% from two or more races. Hispanics or Latinos of any race were 1.54% of the population.

Of the 1,132 households, 29.9% had children under 18 living with them, 54.7% were married couples living together, 10.8% had a female householder with no husband present, and 31.4% were not families. About 28.4% of all households were made up of individuals, and 15.1% had someone living alone who was 65 or older. The average household size was 2.39 and the average family size was 2.92.

In the city, the age distribution was 24.0% under 18, 9.0% from 18 to 24, 25.9% from 25 to 44, 22.8% from 45 to 64, and 18.4% who were 65 or older. The median age was 40 years. For every 100 females, there were 90.8 males. For every 100 females 18 and over, there were 88.7 males.

The median income for a household in the city was $23,550, and for a family was $29,363. Males had a median income of $25,636 versus $20,865 for females. The per capita income for the city was $12,842. About 16.8% of families and 21.5% of the population were below the poverty line, including 28.1% of those under 18 and 13.2% of those 65 or over.

== Notable people ==
- Emmy Award-winning actress Rue McClanahan was born in Healdton.
- University of Oklahoma women's head basketball coach Sherri Coale is from Healdton.

== Museums and historic buildings ==
The Healdton Oil Museum at 10734 Hwy 76 gives a glimpse into the oil boom days of Carter County.

The Healdton Armory at the junction of 4th and Franklin Sts. is NRHP-listed.

== Medical services ==
Healdton is a regional medical provider, with Mercy Hospital Healdton dispensing critical-access hospital care in rural Carter, Jefferson, and Stephens Counties in southern Oklahoma.
