= List of Miami Dolphins in the Pro Football Hall of Fame =

The list of inductees into the Pro Football Hall of Fame includes players, coaches, and contributors (e.g., owners and team or league officials) who have "made outstanding contributions to professional football". The "charter" class of seventeen was selected in 1963.

As of 2023, 18 inductees have played for, coached, or contributed to the Miami Dolphins. Zach Thomas was the most recent Dolphin selected.

According to the Pro Football Hall of Fame, 11 of these men made the major part of their primary contribution to the Miami Dolphins. Six more spent a minor portion of their career with the Dolphins, and Bill Parcells held an administrative position after his coaching career.

Hall of Famers with a had a significant portion of their career with the Dolphins
Miami Dolphins
Inductee	Class	Position	Seasons	Major part of Primary Contribution
Bobby Beathard	2018	Player Personnel Director	1972–1977	Noted for his adept ability to recognize talent through a career that lasted more than three decades. Served as scout for Chiefs and Falcons before joining the Dolphins in 1972. He was an integral part of Miami's two Super Bowl wins. His major impact was as General Manager for the Redskins.
Nick Buoniconti	2001		1969–1974; 1976	Thirteenth-round AFL draft pick, 1962 but made starting lineup with Patriots. Five AFL All-Star Games with Patriots, one with Dolphins. Two Pro Bowls after merger. Leader on Miami's "No-Name Defense". Played in three Super Bowls, including the "Perfect" 17-0 squad. First-team All-AFL/AFC eight times. Named to All-Time AFL team, 1969. Also had major impact for the Boston Patriots
Cris Carter	2013	Wide Receiver	2002	Minnesota Vikings
Larry Csonka	1987	Fullback	1968–1974; 1979	No. 1 draft pick, 1968. Powerful runner. Only 21 fumbles in 1,891 carries. Over 1,000 yards rushing three seasons. Four-time All-AFC, Five Pro Bowls. MVP in Super Bowl VIII. Made comeback with 1979 Dolphins.
Bob Griese	1990	Quarterback	1967–1980	No. 1 draft pick, 1967. Led ball-control offense. Super Bowl VII win capped the "Perfect" season. QB for three AFC titles, also Super Bowl VIII win. NFL Player of the Year, 1971. All-Pro twice, All-AFC three times. Two AFL All-Star games, six AFC-NFC Pro Bowls. Career Record: 25,092 yards, 192 TDs, 77.1 rating passing; 994 yards, 7 TDs rushing
Jimmy Johnson	2020	Coach	1996–1999	Dallas Cowboys
Jim Langer	1987	Offensive Lineman	1970–1979	Signed as free agent, 1970. Played every offensive down in perfect 1972 season, and only had help on three of 500 blocking assignments. First-team All-Pro four times; All-AFC five straight years. Three AFC title games, three Super Bowls, six Pro Bowls
Larry Little	1993	Guard	1969–1980	Free-agent signee with 1967 Chargers. Traded to Miami, 1969. Won starting right guard job. Excellent as pulling guard on sweeps. Outstanding pass blocker. All-Pro six years. Five-time Pro Bowls. Started in three Super Bowls
Dan Marino	2005	Quarterback	1983–1999	At retirement, was the most prolific passer in NFL history – Career statistics: 4,967 completions, 8,358 attempts for 61,361 yards, 420 touchdowns, all records at the time. First player ever to pass for 5,000 yards in a season. Had then-record 48 TDs, 1984. Thirteen 3,000-yard seasons. First or second-team All-Pro eight times. Elected to nine Pro Bowls
Bill Parcells	2013	Executive Vice President of Football Operations	2008-2010	New York Giants as a Coach
Junior Seau	2015	Linebacker	2003–2005	San Diego Chargers
Don Shula	1997	Coach	1970–1995	Most wins of any coach in NFL history. Regular-season record: 328-156-6, .676. Overall record: 347-173-6, .665. First head coaching job at age 33. Seven straight winning seasons with Colts. Only 2 losing seasons in 26 years in Miami. Coached in six Super Bowls. Won Super Bowls VII, VIII. Coached only 17-0 perfect season in NFL history, 1972. Played seven season as defensive back/halfback with Browns, Colts, Redskins.
Dwight Stephenson	1998	Center	1980–1987	Great blocker with quick charge off snap. Best center of his time. All-Pro, All-AFC five straight years, 1983-1987. Five consecutive Pro Bowls. Starting center in Super Bowls XVII, XIX and 1982, 1984, 1985 AFC championship games. Dolphins' offensive captain.
Jason Taylor	2017	Defensive End	1997–2007; 2009, 2011	Registered double-digit sack totals six times over eight seasons (2000–07). Defensive player of the year, 2006. Led NFL with career-high 18.5 sacks, 2002. Career Statistics: 139.5 sacks; 8 interceptions for 110 yards and 3 touchdowns. League record-tying 29 opponents fumbles recovered; NFL record six touchdowns on fumble recoveries, and three safeties. Voted to six Pro Bowls. First-team All-Pro three times. Named to NFL’s All-Decade Team Of The 2000s.
Thurman Thomas	2007	Running Back	2000	Buffalo Bills
Zach Thomas	2023	Linebacker	1996–2007	Registered 10 seasons of 100+ Combined Tackles out of 12 years with Dolphins. AFC Defensive Rookie of the year of 1996. Career Statistics: 1,734 combined tackles; 20.5 sacks; 17 interceptions for 170 yards and 4 touchdowns. Voted to seven Pro Bowls. First-team All-Pro five times. Second-team All-Pro twice. Two-Time NFL LB of the Year. Named to NFL’s All-Decade Team Of The 2000s.
Paul Warfield	1983	Wide Receiver	1970–1974	Cleveland star before 1970 trade to Miami. Opened up Dolphins ball control offense. Precise pattern runner, excellent blocker. Career 427 passes, 8,565 yards, 85 touchdowns. Amazing 20.1-yard per catch average. Elected to eight Pro Bowls. Also had major impact with the Cleveland Browns
George Young	2020	Director of player personnel	1975–1978	New York Giants as General manager
