= List of Pro Football Hall of Fame inductees from defunct NFL franchises =

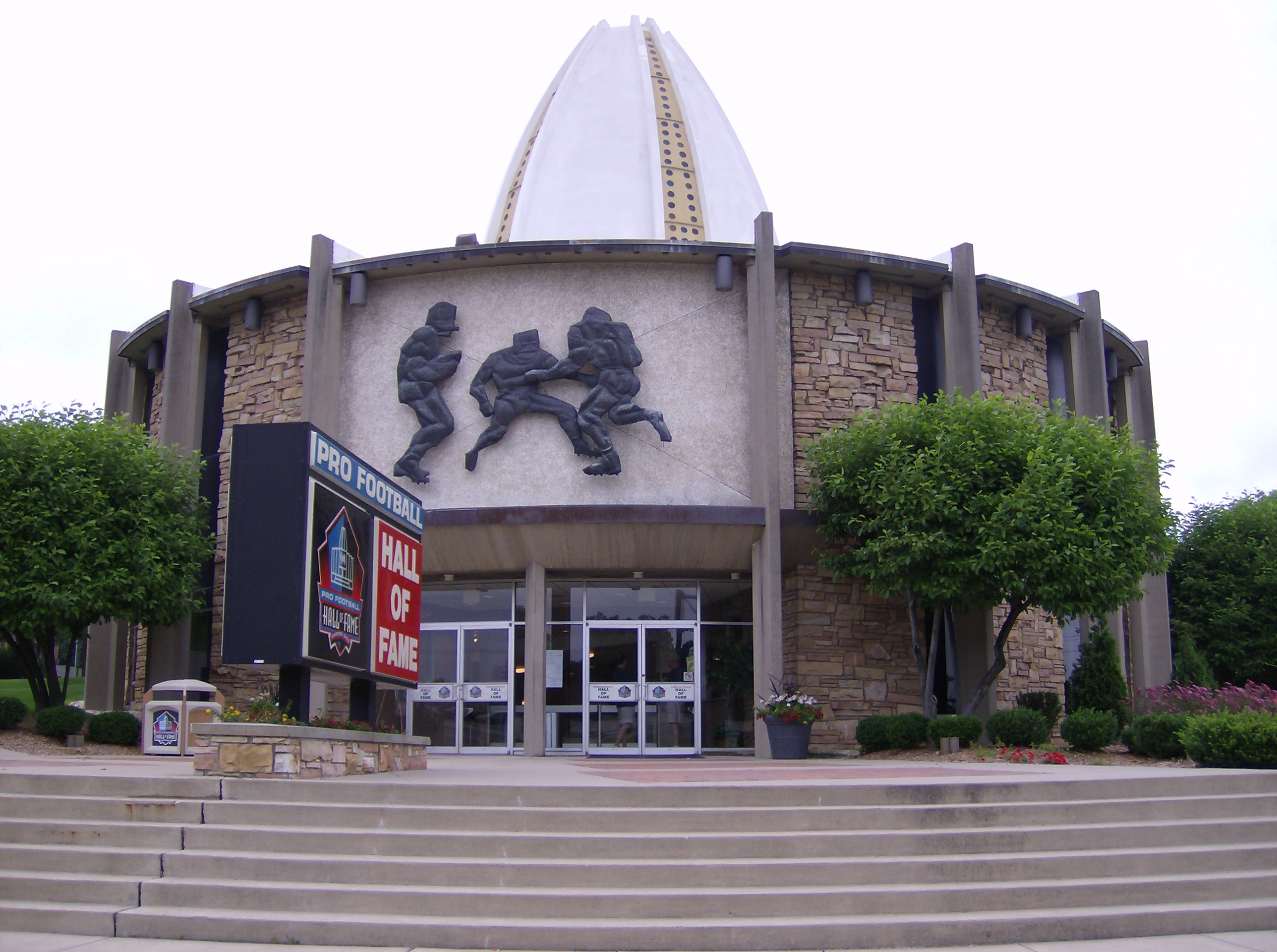
The Pro Football Hall of Fame, located in Canton, Ohio

This is a list of inductees into the Pro Football Hall of Fame that includes inductees who played or coached for franchises that are no longer active. The "charter" class of seventeen was selected in 1963.

Enshrinees are selected by a 44-person Selection Committee which meets each year at the time and location of the Super Bowl. Current rules of the committee stipulate that between four and seven individuals are selected each year. Any person may nominate an individual to the hall, provided the nominee has not played or coached for at least five seasons prior to the nomination. Not including the charter class, 67 players have been inducted in their first year of eligibility.

In addition to the regular Selection Committee, which primarily focuses on contributions made over the past approximately thirty seasons, a nine-member Seniors Committee (which is a subset of the larger committee) submits two nominees each year whose contributions came prior to 1985. These nominees are referred as "Seniors nominees" (formerly "old-timer" nominees).

Two Hall of Famers, Joe Guyon and another Indian halfback, Jim Thorpe, stayed paired together from 1919 to 1924 on four defunct teams. Starting with the 1919–1920 Canton Bulldogs, they next played for the 1921 Cleveland Indians, 1922–1923 Oorang Indians, and the 1924 Rock Island Independents.

== Hall of Famers by team ==
- Hall of Famers who made the major part of their primary contribution for any club have a bronze star in the right column.
- Hall of Famers who spent only a minor portion of their career with a club are listed without the star, and the team list where they made their major contribution is linked in the column.
- These tables use the Pro Football Hall of Fame enshrinees by Team list to credit the Hall of Famers with stars.
- The statistical and biographical information came from the Pro Football Hall of Fame website.
- The list is complete up to the 2013 Hall of Fame class.

=== Akron, Baltimore, Boston, Brooklyn ===
Hall of Famers with a made the Major Part of their Primary Contribution to that Team
Inductee	Class	Position	Seasons	Major part of Primary Contribution
Akron Pros / Indians
Fritz Pollard	2005	Coach	1921	All-America halfback, pro football pioneer. Helped Akron become NFL's first champion, 1920. One of just two African Americans in the NFL at time. NFL's first African American head coach, 1921. Played and sometimes coached four teams in NFL career.
Fritz Pollard	2005	Halfback	1919–1921; 1925–1926	All-America halfback, pro football pioneer. Helped Akron become NFL's first champion, 1920. One of just two African Americans in the NFL at time. NFL's first African American head coach, 1921. Played and sometimes coached four teams in NFL career.
1950 Baltimore Colts
George Blanda	1981	Quarterback/ Kicker	1950	Chicago Bears, Houston Oilers and Oakland Raiders
Art Donovan	1968	Defensive tackle	1950	Baltimore Colts
Y. A. Tittle	1971	Quarterback	1950	San Francisco 49ers, New York Giants
Boston Yanks
Ace Parker	1972	Quarterback	1945	Brooklyn Dodgers
Brooklyn Dodgers/Tigers
Red Badgro	1981	Offensive end Defensive end	1936	New York Giants
Benny Friedman	2005	Quarterback; Coach	1932–1934; 1932	NFL's first great passer. League record 11 touchdown passes as rookie, 1927 – Another record with 20 TDs, 1929. Led league in touchdown passes four consecutive years (1927–1930). NFL record 66 career touchdown passes lasted for years. Triple-threat player, could run, pass, kick. Also had major impact for the New York Giants
Frank "Bruiser" Kinard	1971	Offensive tackle Defensive tackle	1938–1944	Two-time Mississippi All-America, Dodgers' third-round draft pick, 1938. Was small for tackle position, but was tough, aggressive, fast, durable. Only missed one game due to injury, 60-minute performer, excellent tackler. All-NFL, 1940, 1941, 1943, 1944.
Ace Parker	1972	Quarterback	1937–1941	All-American tailback at Duke, All-NFL, 1938–1940, NFL's Most Valuable Player, 1940, Triple-threat, two-way back who led Dodgers to their greatest seasons in 1940, 1941, Led Yankees to AAFC Eastern title in 1946

=== Canton, Cleveland, Columbus, Dallas ===
Hall of Famers with a made the Major Part of their Primary Contribution to that Team
Inductee	Class	Position	Seasons	Major part of Primary Contribution
Canton Bulldogs
Guy Chamberlin	1965	End/ Coach; Pre-Modern Era: Two-Way Performer	1922–1923	Football hero at Nebraska, Was the premier end of the NFL in the 1920s, Iron man two-way performer. Player-coach of four NFL championship teams: 1922–1923 Canton Bulldogs, 1924 Cleveland Bulldogs, 1926 Frankford Yellow Jackets. Six-year coaching record 58-16-7 for an amazing .759 percentage.
Joe Guyon	1966	Halfback	1919–1920	All-America tackle at Georgia Tech, 1918. Triple-threat halfback in pros. Played with Jim Thorpe on four NFL teams. Helped 1927 Giants compile an 11-1-1 record with his many abilities – passing, running, punting, tackling and blocking. His TD pass gave Giants win over Bears for 1927 NFL title.
Pete Henry	1963	Offensive tackle Defensive tackle Punter; Place kicker	1920–1923; 1925–1926	Signed with Bulldogs same day NFL organized, 1920. Largest player of his time, leader of Canton's championship lines, 1922–1923. A 60-minute performer, also punted, kicked field goals. NFL records for longest punt (94 yards), longest dropkick field goal (50 yards)
Pete Henry	1963	Coach	1926	Signed with Bulldogs same day NFL organized, 1920. Largest player of his time, leader of Canton's championship lines, 1922–1923. A 60-minute performer, also punted, kicked field goals. NFL records for longest punt (94 yards), longest dropkick field goal (50 yards)
William R. Lyman	1964	Offensive tackle Defensive tackle	1922–1923; 1925	Started on four title teams: 1922–1923 Canton, 1924 Cleveland, 1933 Bears. Possibly invented the constant shifting by defensive players before each play. Also had major impact with the Chicago Bears
Jim Thorpe	1963	Coach / Halfback	1915–1917; 1919–1920; 1926	1912 Olympic decathlon champion. First big-time athlete to play pro football, playing for pre-NFL Canton Bulldogs in 1915. NickNamed "The Legend" on the all-time NFL team. Was voted top American athlete of first half of 20th century. First president of the NFL.
Cleveland Bulldogs
Guy Chamberlin	1965	End/ Coach; Pre-Modern Era: Two-Way Performer	1924	Canton Bulldogs
Benny Friedman	2005	Quarterback	1927	New York Giants
William R. Lyman	1964	Offensive tackle Defensive tackle	1924	Canton Bulldogs, Chicago Bears
Steve Owen	1966	Offensive tackle Defensive tackle	1925	New York Giants
Cleveland Indians 1921
Joe Guyon	1966	Halfback	1921	New York Giants
Jim Thorpe	1963	Coach / Halfback	1921	Canton Bulldogs
Columbus Panhandles
Joseph Carr	1963	Team Owner	1904, 1907–1922	NFL president 1921–1939
Dallas Texans (NFL)
Art Donovan	1968	Defensive tackle	1952	Baltimore Colts
Gino Marchetti	1972	Defensive end	1952	Baltimore Colts

- All Career Highlights listed at the Pro Football Hall of Fame website.

=== Detroit, Duluth, Frankford, Hammond ===
Hall of Famers with a made the Major Part of their Primary Contribution to that Team
Inductee	Class	Position	Seasons	Major part of Primary Contribution
Detroit Panthers
Jimmy Conzelman	1964	Quarterback; Coach; Team owner	1925–1926	Chicago Cardinals as a coach
Detroit Wolverines
Benny Friedman	2005	Quarterback	1928	New York Giants
Duluth Eskimos
Walt Kiesling	1966	Offensive guard Defensive line	1926–1927	Pittsburgh Steelers
Johnny Blood	1963	Halfback	1926–1927	Green Bay Packers
Ernie Nevers	1963	Fullback; Coach	1926–1927; 1927	Scored record 40 points in one game against Bears, 1929 – Iron man, playing 1714 of 1740 minutes in 29-game 1926 season – All-league all five NFL seasons Also had major impact for the Chicago Cardinals
Frankford Yellow Jackets
Guy Chamberlin	1965	End/ Coach; Pre-Modern Era: Two-Way Performer	1925–1926	Canton Bulldogs
William R. Lyman	1964	Offensive tackle Defensive tackle	1925	Canton Bulldogs, Chicago Bears
Hammond Pros
John "Paddy" Driscoll	1965	Quarterback	pre-NFL 1919	Chicago Cardinals, Chicago Bears
George Halas	1963	Offensive end Defensive end	pre-NFL 1919	Chicago Bears
Fritz Pollard	2005	Halfback; Coach	1923, 1925; 1925	Akron Pros/Indians

- All Career Highlights listed at the Pro Football Hall of Fame website.

=== Kansas City, Milwaukee, New York ===
Hall of Famers with a made the Major Part of their Primary Contribution to that Team
Inductee	Class	Position	Seasons	Major part of Primary Contribution
Kansas City Cowboys
Joe Guyon	1966	Halfback	1924–1925	New York Giants
Steve Owen	1966	Offensive tackle Defensive tackle	1924–1925	New York Giants
Milwaukee Badgers
Jimmy Conzelman	1964	Quarterback; Coach	1922–1924; 1922–1923	Chicago Cardinals as a coach
Johnny Blood	1963	Halfback	1925–1926	Green Bay Packers
Fritz Pollard	2005	Halfback	1922	Akron Pros/Indians
New York Bulldogs/Yanks
Art Donovan	1968	Defensive tackle	1951	Baltimore Colts
Bobby Layne	1967	Quarterback; Placekicker	1949	Detroit Lions, Pittsburgh Steelers
Mike McCormack	1984	Offensive tackle	1951	Cleveland Browns
New York Yankees
Red Badgro	1981	Offensive end Defensive end	1927–1928	New York Giants
Ray Flaherty	1976	Offensive end	1927–1928	Boston/ Washington Redskins as Head Coach
Harold "Red" Grange	1963	Halfback	1927	Chicago Bears
Mike Michalske	1964	Offensive guard Defensive line	1927–1928	Green Bay Packers

- All Career Highlights listed at the Pro Football Hall of Fame website.

=== Oorang, Pottsville, Providence ===
Hall of Famers with a made the Major Part of their Primary Contribution to that Team
Inductee	Class	Position	Seasons	Major part of Primary Contribution
Oorang Indians
Joe Guyon	1966	Halfback	1922–1923	New York Giants
Jim Thorpe	1963	Coach / Halfback	1922–1923	Canton Bulldogs
Pottsville Maroons
Pete Henry	1963	Offensive tackle Defensive tackle Punter; Place Kicker	1927–1928	Canton Bulldogs
Pete Henry	1963	Coach	1928	Canton Bulldogs
Walt Kiesling	1966	Offensive guard Defensive line	1928	Pittsburgh Steelers
Johnny Blood	1963	Halfback	1928	Green Bay Packers
Providence Steam Roller
Jimmy Conzelman	1964	Quarterback; Coach	1927–1929; 1927–1930	Chicago Cardinals as a coach
Fritz Pollard	2005	Halfback	1925	Akron Pros/Indians

- All Career Highlights listed at the Pro Football Hall of Fame website.

=== Rock Island, Staten Island, Washington ===
Hall of Famers with a made the Major Part of their Primary Contribution to that Team
Inductee	Class	Position	Seasons	Major part of Primary Contribution
Rock Island Independents
Jimmy Conzelman	1964	Quarterback; Coach	1921–1922	Chicago Cardinals as a coach
Joe Guyon	1966	Halfback	1924	New York Giants
Ed Healey	1964	Offensive tackle Defensive tackle	1920–1922	Chicago Bears
Jim Thorpe	1963	Halfback	1924–1925	Canton Bulldogs
Staten Island Stapletons
Ken Strong	1967	Halfback; Placekicker	1929–1932	New York Giants
Washington Senators
Joe Guyon	1966	Halfback	1921	New York Giants

- All Career Highlights listed at the Pro Football Hall of Fame website.

== See also ==
- List of Pro Football Hall of Fame inductees
