= List of Buffalo Bills in the Pro Football Hall of Fame =

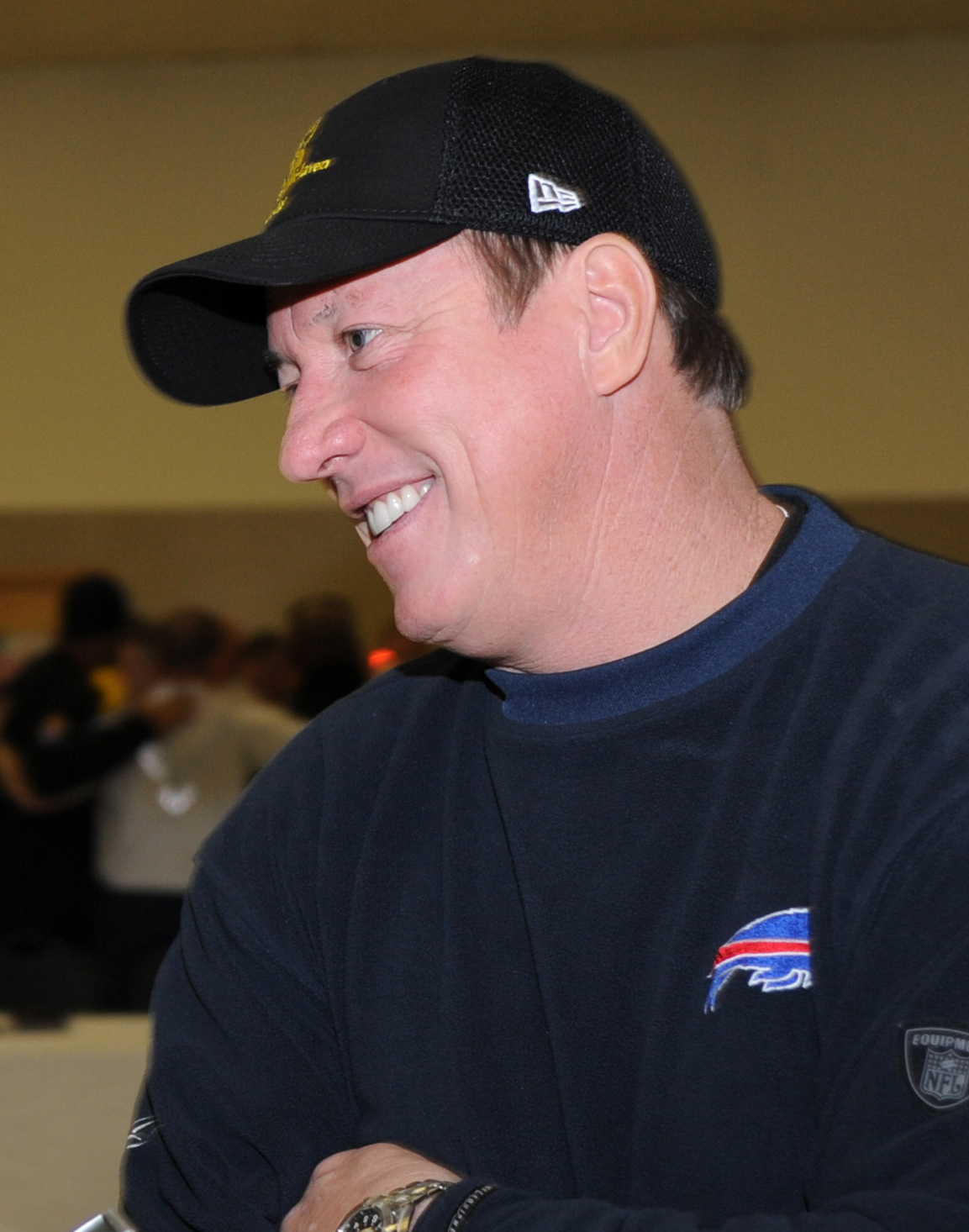
Under the "K-Gun" offense, Jim Kelly led Buffalo to a record four consecutive Super Bowl appearances. He played all eleven seasons of his career for the Bills, and was inducted in 2002.

The Buffalo Bills are a professional American football team based in the Buffalo, New York metropolitan area. They are members of the Eastern Division of the American Football Conference (AFC) in the National Football League (NFL). The Bills franchise was formed in 1960 as a charter member of the American Football League (AFL), before joining the NFL as part of the AFL-NFL merger of 1970.

In 1963, the Pro Football Hall of Fame was created to honor the history of professional American football and the individuals who have greatly influenced it. Since the charter induction class of 1963, 14 individuals who have played, coached, or held an administrative position for the Bills have been inducted into the Pro Football Hall of Fame.

According to the Pro Football Hall of Fame, 10 of these men made the major part of their primary contribution to the Buffalo Bills. James Lofton and Terrell Owens spent a minor portion of their careers with the Bills, and two others (Jim Ringo and Dick LeBeau) were assistant coaches.

== Inductees ==
Hall of Famers with a had a significant portion of their career with the Bills
Buffalo Bills
Inductee	Class	Position	Seasons	Major part of Primary Contribution	Ref
Joe DeLamielleure	2003	Offensive Guard	1973–1979; 1985	Selected by Bills in 1st round, 1973 draft, All-American at Michigan State, earned All-Rookie Honor, played in 185 consecutive games, was the 'anchor' of Bills' famed "Electric Company" offensive line, best known as lead blocker for O.J. Simpson, NFL's first 2,000-yard rusher, 1973 - selected All-Pro and All-AFC 1975 through 1980, made six Pro Bowls, named to NFL's 1970s all-decade team Also had major impact for the Cleveland Browns	
Jim Kelly	2002	Quarterback	1986–1996	Selected by Bills in 1st round, 1983 draft, passed for more than 3,000 in a season eight times, Master of "No-Huddle" offense, led Buffalo to 8 postseason berths, starting QB in a record 4 straight AFC Championships and Super Bowls, named to 4 Pro Bowls - Career stats: 35,467 yards, 237 touchdowns, 84.4 passer rating, led NFL with 101.2 rating, 1990	
Dick LeBeau	2010	Asst. Head Coach	2003	Detroit Lions as a Cornerback (12 straight seasons with three or more interceptions. Voted to three consecutive Pro Bowls. All-NFL second-team four times. NFC-leading nine interceptions, 1970. - 62 career interceptions for 762 yards and three touchdowns, ranked third all-time at retirement.)	
Marv Levy	2001	Coach; General Manager	1986–1997; 2006–2007	Designed high-powered “No-Huddle" offense, record four consecutive Super Bowl appearances, 1988 NFL Coach of the Year, AFC Coach of the Year 1988, 1993, 1995 - had 154-120-0 overall record, his coaching victories ranked 10th in NFL history at his retirement, guided Buffalo to 8 playoff appearances in 11 seasons.	
James Lofton	2003	Wide Receiver	1989–1992	Green Bay Packers; More than 50 receptions in a season nine times. First NFL player to score a touchdown in the 1970s, 1980s, and 1990s. - 16 seasons, 764 passes for 14,004 yards, which was the NFL record at the time of his retirement. All-Pro four times, All-NFC three times, Eight Pro Bowls.	
Terrell Owens	2018	Wide Receiver	2009	San Francisco 49ers More than 60 receptions in twelve of his fifteen seasons. Eclipsed the 1,000 yard mark in nine seasons, in addition to eight seasons with double-digit TD receptions. - 15 seasons, 1,078 receptions for 15,934 yards, and 153 receiving touchdowns. Named an All-Pro five times, in addition to six Pro Bowl selections.	
Bill Polian	2015	Personnel Director General Manager	1984 1985–1992	Turned fortunes around of three different teams with eight combined championship games, five Super Bowls appearances; Guided Buffalo to four straight division titles, three Super Bowl berths; Led Carolina to NFC championship in just second season; Colts GM for eight division titles, two Super Bowl appearances and Super Bowl XLI win; Named NFL’s Executive of Year by The Sporting News six times Also had major impact for the Indianapolis Colts	
Andre Reed	2014	Wide Receiver	1985–1999	Fourth round pick by Buffalo, 1985; His 941 career receptions are third all-time at the time of his retirement; 13,198 career receiving yards; Known for his “yards after catch,”; His 13 seasons with 50-plus receptions second only to Jerry Rice; All-AFC four times; seven Pro Bowls	
Jim Ringo	1981	Coach; Off. Coordinator	1976–1977; 1985–1988	Green Bay Packers as a Center; All-Pro before Packers dynasty years. All-NFL seven times. 10 Pro Bowls, three NFL championship games. Great down-field blocker, pass protector. Started in then-record 182 straight games, 1954–1967, playing through many injuries.	
Billy Shaw	1999	Offensive Guard	1961–1969	First player to spend entire career in AFL to be elected to Hall of Fame, Two-way collegiate player, drafted by Cowboys (NFL) and Bills (AFL), chose Bills to play on offensive line, adept at both pass blocking and run blocking, was a driving force behind offensive unit that led Buffalo to back-to-back AFL championships in 1964, 1965, 8 AFL All-Star games - All AFL Team 5 times.	
O. J. Simpson	1985	Running Back	1969–1977	Heisman Trophy winner, 1968; first overall NFL draft pick, 1969, career highlighted by 2,003 yards rushing 1973, unanimous All-Pro plus exceeded 1,000 yards rushing, 1972–1976, won four NFL rushing titles, career record 11,236 yards rushing, 203 receptions, 990 yards kickoff returns, 14,368 combined net yards.	
Bruce Smith	2009	Defensive End	1985–1999	Bills’ first-round draft pick (1st player overall), 1985 NFL draft, considered one of the most dominant defensive players in NFL history, his 200 career sacks is the NFL all-time record, had 10 or more sacks in an NFL record 13 seasons, NFL Defensive player of the year, 1990 and 1996 - named to NFL's All Decade teams of the 1980s and 1990s, 1st or 2nd team All-Pro 11 times, chosen for 11 Pro Bowls.	
Thurman Thomas	2007	Running Back	1988–1999	Bills’ 2nd round pick in 1988 NFL draft, led NFL in total yards from scrimmage a record 4 consecutive seasons, NFL’s most valuable player, 1991, rushed for 1,000 yards in 8 consecutive seasons His ability to catch the ball as well as run with it was a key ingredient to the Bills' "No-Huddle" offensive attack, 5 straight Pro-Bowls, career numbers 12,074 yards rushing and 16,532 all-purpose yards.	
Ralph Wilson	2009	Team owner	1959–2014	Original owner in the American Football League - known among NFL owners as "the voice of reason,” for his ability to tackle some of the NFL's toughest issues. During his tenure as Bills owner, team won 2 AFL Championships and a remarkable 4 straight AFC championships. Bills 103 regular season wins were 2nd most in the NFL during 1990S. Began talks with Carroll Rosenbloom, then owner of NFL’s Colts in January 1965, that eventually resulted in AFL-NFL merger	

- All Career Highlights listed at the Pro Football Hall of Fame website.
