= List of Pro Football Hall of Fame inductees =

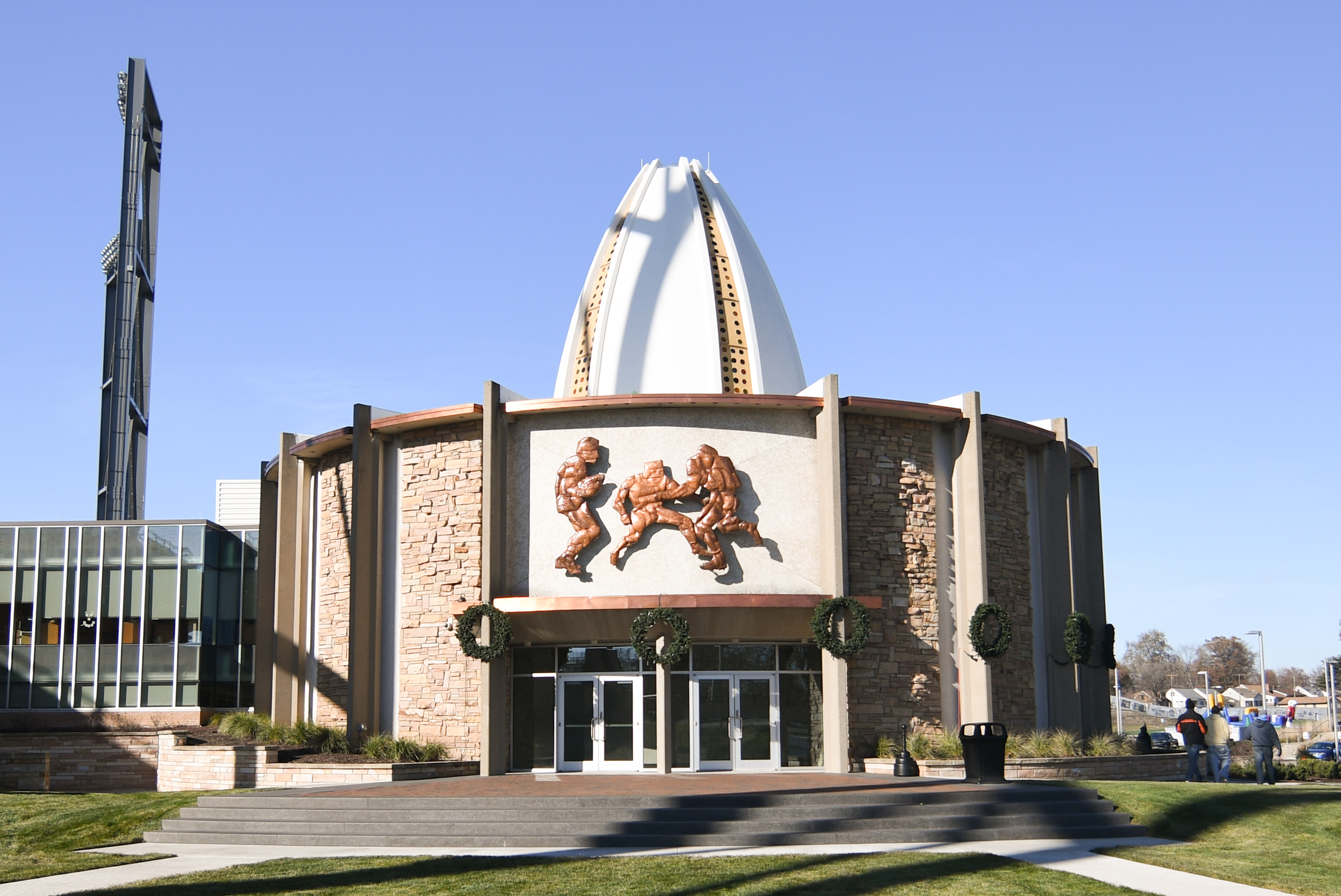
The Pro Football Hall of Fame in Canton, Ohio

The Pro Football Hall of Fame includes players, coaches, donors, and contributors (e.g., owners, general managers and team or league officials or other non-players) who have "made outstanding contributions to professional football". The charter class of seventeen was selected in 1963.

Enshrinees are selected by a 48-person selection committee which meets each year at the time and location of the Super Bowl. The rules of the committee stipulate that between four and eight individuals are selected each year. Any person may nominate an individual to the hall, provided the nominee has been retired for at least five years. Not including the charter class, 76 players have been inducted in their first year of eligibility.

In addition to the regular selection committee, which primarily focuses on contributions made over the past approximately thirty seasons, a nine-member seniors committee (which is a subset of the larger committee) submits two nominees each year whose contributions came prior to 1985. These nominees are referred as "seniors nominees" (formerly "old-timer" nominees).

In 2020, a special Blue-Ribbon Panel selected an additional 15 new members, known as the "Centennial Slate", to be inducted into the Hall of Fame to celebrate the 100th anniversary of the National Football League (NFL).

== Inductees ==
All 32 active NFL teams have at least one player in the Hall of Fame who played for their team at some point in that player's career, with the Houston Texans (Andre Johnson, class of 2024) and Jacksonville Jaguars (Tony Boselli, class of 2022) being the last two teams to gain representation. Ray Guy was the first full-time punter inducted (class of 2014), while Devin Hester was the first primary return specialist (class of 2024). As of 2026, both are the only honorees at their respective positions.

The hall is not officially affiliated with the National Football League (NFL), although, as of 2026, all but one enshrinee, Billy Shaw, played in the NFL for at least a portion of his career. In addition to Shaw, there are 37 other inductees who spent all or part of their careers in the American Football League that merged with the NFL. Shaw was the only player not to make the formal transition to the NFL, as he had retired the year before the merger. Three players, Red Grange, Ray Flaherty, Mike Michalske, played a portion of their career in the first American Football League from 1926. Ken Strong is the lone Hall of Fame inductee who played during the second iteration of the American Football League from 1936. Strong is also one of two Hall of Famers (the other being Sid Luckman) to play in the American Association. Fifteen inductees spent some of their playing career in the All-America Football Conference during the late 1940s. Five players played at least one year in the Ohio League, the predecessor to the NFL. Seven players or coaches who spent part of their careers in the original incarnation of the United States Football League (USFL) have been inducted. Two coaches (Marv Levy, Bud Grant), one administrator (Jim Finks), and five players (Warren Moon, Fred Biletnikoff, John Henry Johnson, Don Maynard, Arnie Weinmeister) who spent part of their careers in the Canadian Football League (CFL) have been inducted. Of these inductees, three have been or are scheduled to be inducted into the Canadian Football Hall of Fame: Marv Levy, Warren Moon and Bud Grant. Four players, Larry Csonka, Leroy Kelly, Don Maynard, and Paul Warfield, played a portion of their career in the short-lived World Football League. Fritz Pollard is the only player to play in the Anthracite League's only season. One player (Kurt Warner) and one owner (Pat Bowlen) made significant contributions in the Arena Football League; Warner, Art McNally, and Adam Vinatieri are also the only NFL Europe/World League alumni in the Hall. Terrell Owens played one season of professional football in the Indoor Football League and, after his induction, played in Fan Controlled Football. Bill Walsh and Ken Stabler each played one season in the Continental Football League.

Each entry includes the year of induction (i.e., "class"), position(s) played, team(s) each was associated with, and tenures with each team. As some inductees were both players and coaches, the position indicated here is the position indicated on the Hall of Fame website. The Pro Football Hall of Fame website does not include CFL, USFL, WFL, indoor football leagues, and other lesser known league teams. The Canadian Football League and the Arena Football League both have their own halls of fame. NFL, American Football League, All-America Football Conference, and Ohio League (listed as pre-NFL) teams are recognized in the Hall of Fame. The list is complete through the Class of 2026.

Sorting tips:

- Sorting by position will line up players by the year they were inducted
- Sorting by position also groups all similar positions together
  - Running backs, halfbacks, fullbacks are grouped together
  - Linebackers, middle linebackers, outside linebackers are grouped together
  - Ends and flankers are grouped with wide receivers
  - General managers and team administrators are grouped together
- Sorting by teams groups all names of a franchise together, i.e., all Cardinal teams listed under Arizona Cardinals
- When sorting, a person has a row for every team he has been with

| Elected in 1st year of eligibility** | Elected 1st year as a finalist ^ but not first year of eligibility | Seventeen charter members § | Fifteen Centennial Slate members † |

Biographies and statistics can be referenced at the Hall of Fame web site.
| Inductee | Class | Position | Team(s) | Years |
|---|---|---|---|---|
| Herb Adderley | 1980 | Cornerback | Green Bay Packers | 1961–1969 |
| Herb Adderley | 1980 | Cornerback | Dallas Cowboys | 1970–1972 |
| Troy Aikman** | 2006 | Quarterback | Dallas Cowboys | 1989–2000 |
| Eric Allen | 2025 | Cornerback | Philadelphia Eagles | 1988–1994 |
| Eric Allen | 2025 | Cornerback | New Orleans Saints | 1995–1997 |
| Eric Allen | 2025 | Cornerback | Oakland Raiders | 1998–2001 |
| George Allen^{[3]} | 2002 | Coach | Los Angeles Rams | 1966–1970 |
| George Allen^{[3]} | 2002 | Coach | Washington Redskins | 1971–1977 |
| George Allen^{[3]} | 2002 | General manager | Washington Redskins | 1971–1977 |
| Jared Allen | 2025 | Defensive end | Kansas City Chiefs | 2004–2007 |
| Jared Allen | 2025 | Defensive end | Minnesota Vikings | 2008–2013 |
| Jared Allen | 2025 | Defensive end | Chicago Bears | 2014–2015 |
| Jared Allen | 2025 | Defensive end | Carolina Panthers | 2015 |
| Larry Allen** | 2013 | Guard/tackle | Dallas Cowboys | 1994–2005 |
| Larry Allen** | 2013 | Guard/tackle | San Francisco 49ers | 2006–2007 |
| Marcus Allen** ^{[4]} | 2003 | Running back | Los Angeles Raiders | 1982–1992 |
| Marcus Allen** ^{[4]} | 2003 | Running back | Kansas City Chiefs | 1993–1997 |
| Lance Alworth** | 1978 | Wide receiver | San Diego Chargers | 1962–1970 |
| Lance Alworth** | 1978 | Wide receiver | Dallas Cowboys | 1971–1972 |
| Morten Andersen | 2017 | Placekicker | New Orleans Saints | 1982–1994 |
| Morten Andersen | 2017 | Placekicker | Atlanta Falcons | 1995–2000; 2006–2007 |
| Morten Andersen | 2017 | Placekicker | New York Giants | 2001 |
| Morten Andersen | 2017 | Placekicker | Kansas City Chiefs | 2002–2003 |
| Morten Andersen | 2017 | Placekicker | Minnesota Vikings | 2004 |
| Doug Atkins | 1982 | Defensive end | Cleveland Browns | 1953–1954 |
| Doug Atkins | 1982 | Defensive end | Chicago Bears | 1955–1966 |
| Doug Atkins | 1982 | Defensive end | New Orleans Saints | 1967–1969 |
| Steve Atwater | 2020 | Safety | Denver Broncos | 1989–1998 |
| Steve Atwater | 2020 | Safety | New York Jets | 1999 |
| Red Badgro ^^{[3]} | 1981 | End Pre-Modern Era: Two-Way Performer | New York Yankees (NFL) | 1927–1928 |
| Red Badgro ^^{[3]} | 1981 | End Pre-Modern Era: Two-Way Performer | New York Giants | 1930–1935 |
| Red Badgro ^^{[3]} | 1981 | End Pre-Modern Era: Two-Way Performer | Brooklyn Dodgers | 1936 |
| Champ Bailey** | 2019 | Cornerback | Washington Redskins | 1999–2003 |
| Champ Bailey** | 2019 | Cornerback | Denver Broncos | 2004–2013 |
| Ronde Barber | 2023 | Cornerback/safety | Tampa Bay Buccaneers | 1997–2012 |
| Lem Barney | 1992 | Cornerback | Detroit Lions | 1967–1977 |
| Cliff Battles | 1968 | Halfback Pre-Modern Era: Two-Way Performer | Boston Braves/ Boston Redskins/ Washington Redskins | 1932–1937 |
| Sammy Baugh § | 1963 | Quarterback Pre-Modern Era: Two-Way Performer | Washington Redskins | 1937–1952 |
| Sammy Baugh § | 1963 | Defensive back Pre-Modern Era: Two-Way Performer | Washington Redskins | 1937–1952 |
| Sammy Baugh § | 1963 | Punter | Washington Redskins | 1937–1952 |
| Bobby Beathard ^ | 2018 | Personnel administrator | Kansas City Chiefs | 1963, 1966–1967 |
| Bobby Beathard ^ | 2018 | Personnel administrator | Atlanta Falcons | 1968–1971 |
| Bobby Beathard ^ | 2018 | Personnel administrator | Miami Dolphins | 1972–1977 |
| Bobby Beathard ^ | 2018 | General manager | Washington Redskins | 1978–1989 |
| Bobby Beathard ^ | 2018 | General manager | San Diego Chargers | 1990–2000 |
| Chuck Bednarik** | 1967 | Center Two-Way Performer | Philadelphia Eagles | 1949–1962 |
| Chuck Bednarik** | 1967 | Linebacker Two-Way Performer | Philadelphia Eagles | 1949–1962 |
| Bert Bell § | 1963 | Team owner/founder | Philadelphia Eagles | 1933–1940 |
| Bert Bell § | 1963 | Coach | Philadelphia Eagles | 1936–1940 |
| Bert Bell § | 1963 | Coach | Pittsburgh Steelers | 1941 |
| Bert Bell § | 1963 | Team co-owner | Pittsburgh Steelers | 1941–1946 |
| Bert Bell § | 1963 | NFL commissioner | n/a | 1946–1959 |
| Bobby Bell ^ | 1983 | Linebacker/defensive end | Kansas City Chiefs | 1963–1974 |
| Raymond Berry** | 1973 | Wide receiver | Baltimore Colts | 1955–1967 |
| Elvin Bethea ^ | 2003 | Defensive end | Houston Oilers | 1968–1983 |
| Jerome Bettis | 2015 | Running back | Los Angeles/ St. Louis Rams | 1993–1995 |
| Jerome Bettis | 2015 | Running back | Pittsburgh Steelers | 1996–2005 |
| Charles Bidwill | 1967 | Team owner | Chicago Cardinals | 1933–1946 |
| Fred Biletnikoff | 1988 | Wide receiver | Oakland Raiders | 1965–1978 |
| George Blanda** | 1981 | Quarterback/placekicker | Chicago Bears | 1949–1958 |
| George Blanda** | 1981 | Quarterback/placekicker | Baltimore Colts (1950 Colts folded) | 1950 |
| George Blanda** | 1981 | Quarterback/placekicker | Houston Oilers | 1960–1966 |
| George Blanda** | 1981 | Quarterback/placekicker | Oakland Raiders | 1967–1975 |
| Johnny Blood § | 1963 | Halfback Pre-Modern Era: Two-Way Performer | Milwaukee Badgers | 1925–1926 |
| Johnny Blood § | 1963 | Halfback Pre-Modern Era: Two-Way Performer | Duluth Eskimos | 1926–1927 |
| Johnny Blood § | 1963 | Halfback Pre-Modern Era: Two-Way Performer | Pottsville Maroons | 1928 |
| Johnny Blood § | 1963 | Halfback Pre-Modern Era: Two-Way Performer | Green Bay Packers | 1929–1933, 1935–1936 |
| Johnny Blood § | 1963 | Halfback Pre-Modern Era: Two-Way Performer | Pittsburgh Pirates | 1934, 1937–1938 |
| Mel Blount** | 1989 | Cornerback | Pittsburgh Steelers | 1970–1983 |
| Tony Boselli | 2022 | Offensive tackle | Jacksonville Jaguars | 1995–2001 |
| Pat Bowlen ^ | 2019 | Team owner | Denver Broncos | 1984–2019 |
| Terry Bradshaw** | 1989 | Quarterback | Pittsburgh Steelers | 1970–1983 |
| Cliff Branch ^{[3]} | 2022 | Wide receiver | Oakland/Los Angeles Raiders | 1972–1985 |
| Gil Brandt ^ | 2019 | VP of player personnel | Dallas Cowboys | 1960–1988 |
| Gil Brandt ^ | 2019 | Contributor | NFL.com | 1995–2023 |
| Robert Brazile ^^{[3]} | 2018 | Linebacker | Houston Oilers | 1975–1984 |
| Drew Brees** | 2026 | Quarterback | San Diego Chargers | 2001–2005 |
| Drew Brees** | 2026 | Quarterback | New Orleans Saints | 2006–2020 |
| Derrick Brooks** | 2014 | Linebacker | Tampa Bay Buccaneers | 1995–2008 |
| Bob Brown^{[3]} | 2004 | Offensive tackle | Philadelphia Eagles | 1964–1968 |
| Bob Brown^{[3]} | 2004 | Offensive tackle | Los Angeles Rams | 1969–1970 |
| Bob Brown^{[3]} | 2004 | Offensive tackle | Oakland Raiders | 1971–1973 |
| Jim Brown** | 1971 | Fullback | Cleveland Browns | 1957–1965 |
| Paul Brown | 1967 | Coach/general manager | Cleveland Browns (AAFC/ NFL) | 1946–1962 |
| Paul Brown | 1967 | Coach/general manager | Cincinnati Bengals | 1968–1975 |
| Paul Brown | 1967 | Team owner/general manager | Cincinnati Bengals | 1968–1991 |
| Rosey Brown | 1975 | Offensive tackle | New York Giants | 1953–1965 |
| Tim Brown^{[4]} | 2015 | Wide receiver/punt returner | Los Angeles/Oakland Raiders | 1988–2003 |
| Tim Brown^{[4]} | 2015 | Wide receiver | Tampa Bay Buccaneers | 2004 |
| Willie Brown** | 1984 | Cornerback | Denver Broncos | 1963–1966 |
| Willie Brown** | 1984 | Cornerback | Oakland Raiders | 1967–1978 |
| Isaac Bruce | 2020 | Wide receiver | Los Angeles/ St. Louis Rams | 1994–2007 |
| Isaac Bruce | 2020 | Wide receiver | San Francisco 49ers | 2008–2009 |
| Buck Buchanan | 1990 | Defensive tackle | Kansas City Chiefs | 1963–1975 |
| Nick Buoniconti ^^{[3]} | 2001 | Linebacker | Boston Patriots | 1962–1968 |
| Nick Buoniconti ^^{[3]} | 2001 | Linebacker | Miami Dolphins | 1969–1974, 1976 |
| Dick Butkus** | 1979 | Linebacker | Chicago Bears | 1965–1973 |
| Jack Butler ^^{[3]} | 2012 | Cornerback | Pittsburgh Steelers | 1951–1959 |
| LeRoy Butler | 2022 | Safety | Green Bay Packers | 1990–2001 |
| Earl Campbell** ^{[4]} | 1991 | Running back | Houston Oilers | 1978–1984 |
| Earl Campbell** ^{[4]} | 1991 | Running back | New Orleans Saints | 1984–1985 |
| Tony Canadeo^{[3]} | 1974 | Halfback Pre-Modern Era: Two-Way Performer | Green Bay Packers | 1941–1944, 1946–1952 |
| Harold Carmichael †^{[3]} | 2020 | Wide receiver | Philadelphia Eagles | 1971–1983 |
| Harold Carmichael †^{[3]} | 2020 | Wide receiver | Dallas Cowboys | 1984 |
| Joseph Carr § | 1963 | Team owner | Columbus Panhandles | 1904, 1907–1922 |
| Joseph Carr § | 1963 | NFL co-organizer | n/a | 1920 |
| Joseph Carr § | 1963 | NFL president | n/a | 1921–1939 |
| Harry Carson | 2006 | Linebacker | New York Giants | 1976–1988 |
| Cris Carter | 2013 | Wide receiver | Philadelphia Eagles | 1987–1989 |
| Cris Carter | 2013 | Wide receiver | Minnesota Vikings | 1990–2001 |
| Cris Carter | 2013 | Wide receiver | Miami Dolphins | 2002 |
| Dave Casper | 2002 | Tight end | Oakland/ Los Angeles Raiders | 1974–1980, 1984 |
| Dave Casper | 2002 | Tight end | Houston Oilers | 1980–1983 |
| Dave Casper | 2002 | Tight end | Minnesota Vikings | 1983 |
| Guy Chamberlin | 1965 | End Pre-Modern Era: Two-Way Performer | Canton Bulldogs (pre-NFL) | 1919 |
| Guy Chamberlin | 1965 | End Pre-Modern Era: Two-Way Performer | Decatur Staleys/ Chicago Staleys | 1920–1921 |
| Guy Chamberlin | 1965 | Coach/end Pre-Modern Era: Two-Way Performer | Canton Bulldogs | 1922–1923 |
| Guy Chamberlin | 1965 | Coach/end Pre-Modern Era: Two-Way Performer | Cleveland Bulldogs | 1924 |
| Guy Chamberlin | 1965 | Coach/end Pre-Modern Era: Two-Way Performer | Frankford Yellow Jackets | 1925–1926 |
| Guy Chamberlin | 1965 | Coach/end Pre-Modern Era: Two-Way Performer | Chicago Cardinals | 1927 |
| Jack Christiansen ^ | 1970 | Safety/kick returner | Detroit Lions | 1951–1958 |
| Dutch Clark § | 1963 | Running back Pre-Modern Era: Two-Way Performer | Portsmouth Spartans/ Detroit Lions | 1931–1932; 1934–1938 |
| George Connor | 1975 | Linebacker | Chicago Bears | 1948–1955 |
| Jimmy Conzelman | 1964 | Quarterback Pre-Modern Era: Two-Way Performer | Decatur Staleys | 1920 |
| Jimmy Conzelman | 1964 | Quarterback/coach Pre-Modern Era: Two-Way Performer | Rock Island Independents | 1921–1922 |
| Jimmy Conzelman | 1964 | Quarterback/coach Pre-Modern Era: Two-Way Performer | Milwaukee Badgers | 1922–1923 |
| Jimmy Conzelman | 1964 | Quarterback Pre-Modern Era: Two-Way Performer | Milwaukee Badgers | 1924 |
| Jimmy Conzelman | 1964 | Team owner/quarterback/coach Pre-Modern Era: Two-Way Performer | Detroit Panthers | 1925–1926 |
| Jimmy Conzelman | 1964 | Quarterback/coach Pre-Modern Era: Two-Way Performer | Providence Steam Roller | 1927–1929 |
| Jimmy Conzelman | 1964 | Coach | Providence Steam Roller | 1927–1930 |
| Jimmy Conzelman | 1964 | Coach | Chicago Cardinals | 1940–1942, 1946–1948 |
| Don Coryell | 2023 | Coach | St. Louis Cardinals | 1973–1977 |
| Don Coryell | 2023 | Coach | San Diego Chargers | 1978–1986 |
| Jim Covert †^{[3]} | 2020 | Offensive tackle | Chicago Bears | 1983–1990 |
| Bill Cowher † | 2020 | Coach | Pittsburgh Steelers | 1992–2006 |
| Roger Craig ^{[3]} | 2026 | Running back | San Francisco 49ers | 1983–1990 |
| Roger Craig ^{[3]} | 2026 | Running back | Los Angeles Raiders | 1991 |
| Roger Craig ^{[3]} | 2026 | Running back | Minnesota Vikings | 1992–1993 |
| Lou Creekmur^{[3]} | 1996 | Offensive tackle/guard | Detroit Lions | 1950–1959 |
| Larry Csonka | 1987 | Fullback | Miami Dolphins | 1968–1974, 1979 |
| Larry Csonka | 1987 | Fullback | New York Giants | 1976–1978 |
| Curley Culp ^^{[3]} | 2013 | Defensive tackle | Kansas City Chiefs | 1968–1974 |
| Curley Culp ^^{[3]} | 2013 | Defensive tackle | Houston Oilers | 1974–1980 |
| Curley Culp ^^{[3]} | 2013 | Defensive tackle | Detroit Lions | 1980–1981 |
| Al Davis | 1992 | Coach | Oakland Raiders | 1963–1965 |
| Al Davis | 1992 | General manager | Oakland/ Los Angeles Raiders | 1963–2011 |
| Al Davis | 1992 | Team owner | Oakland/ Los Angeles Raiders | 1966–2011 |
| Al Davis | 1992 | AFL commissioner | n/a | 1966 |
| Terrell Davis | 2017 | Running back | Denver Broncos | 1995–2001 |
| Willie Davis | 1981 | Defensive end | Cleveland Browns | 1958–1959 |
| Willie Davis | 1981 | Defensive end | Green Bay Packers | 1960–1969 |
| Brian Dawkins | 2018 | Safety | Philadelphia Eagles | 1996–2008 |
| Brian Dawkins | 2018 | Safety | Denver Broncos | 2009–2011 |
| Dermontti Dawson | 2012 | Center | Pittsburgh Steelers | 1988–2000 |
| Len Dawson | 1987 | Quarterback | Pittsburgh Steelers | 1957–1959 |
| Len Dawson | 1987 | Quarterback | Cleveland Browns | 1960–1961 |
| Len Dawson | 1987 | Quarterback | Dallas Texans (AFL)/ Kansas City Chiefs | 1962–1975 |
| Fred Dean | 2008 | Defensive end | San Diego Chargers | 1975–1981 |
| Fred Dean | 2008 | Defensive end | San Francisco 49ers | 1981–1985 |
| Edward J. DeBartolo, Jr. | 2016 | Team owner | San Francisco 49ers | 1977–2000 |
| Joe DeLamielleure ^ | 2003 | Guard | Buffalo Bills | 1973–1979, 1985 |
| Joe DeLamielleure ^ | 2003 | Guard | Cleveland Browns | 1980–1984 |
| Richard Dent | 2011 | Defensive end | Chicago Bears | 1983–1993, 1995 |
| Richard Dent | 2011 | Defensive end | San Francisco 49ers | 1994 |
| Richard Dent | 2011 | Defensive end | Indianapolis Colts | 1996 |
| Richard Dent | 2011 | Defensive end | Philadelphia Eagles | 1997 |
| Eric Dickerson** | 1999 | Running back | Los Angeles Rams | 1983–1987 |
| Eric Dickerson** | 1999 | Running back | Indianapolis Colts | 1987–1991 |
| Eric Dickerson** | 1999 | Running back | Los Angeles Raiders | 1992 |
| Eric Dickerson** | 1999 | Running back | Atlanta Falcons | 1993 |
| Dan Dierdorf | 1996 | Offensive tackle | St. Louis Cardinals | 1971–1983 |
| Bobby Dillon †^{[3]} | 2020 | Defensive back | Green Bay Packers | 1952–1959 |
| Mike Ditka | 1988 | Tight end | Chicago Bears | 1961–1966 |
| Mike Ditka | 1988 | Tight end | Philadelphia Eagles | 1967–1968 |
| Mike Ditka | 1988 | Tight end | Dallas Cowboys | 1969–1972 |
| Chris Doleman | 2012 | Defensive end/linebacker | Minnesota Vikings | 1985–1993, 1999 |
| Chris Doleman | 2012 | Defensive end/linebacker | Atlanta Falcons | 1994–1995 |
| Chris Doleman | 2012 | Defensive end/linebacker | San Francisco 49ers | 1996–1998 |
| Art Donovan | 1968 | Defensive tackle | Baltimore Colts (1950 Colts folded) | 1950 |
| Art Donovan | 1968 | Defensive tackle | New York Yanks | 1951 |
| Art Donovan | 1968 | Defensive tackle | Dallas Texans (NFL) | 1952 |
| Art Donovan | 1968 | Defensive tackle | Baltimore Colts | 1953–1961 |
| Tony Dorsett** ^{[4]} | 1994 | Running back | Dallas Cowboys | 1977–1987 |
| Tony Dorsett** ^{[4]} | 1994 | Running back | Denver Broncos | 1988 |
| John "Paddy" Driscoll | 1965 | Quarterback Pre-Modern Era: Two-Way Performer | Hammond Pros (pre-NFL) | 1919 |
| John "Paddy" Driscoll | 1965 | Quarterback Pre-Modern Era: Two-Way Performer | Decatur Staleys | 1920 |
| John "Paddy" Driscoll | 1965 | Quarterback Pre-Modern Era: Two-Way Performer | Racine/ Chicago Cardinals | 1920–1925 |
| John "Paddy" Driscoll | 1965 | Quarterback Pre-Modern Era: Two-Way Performer | Chicago Bears | 1926–1929 |
| Bill Dudley | 1966 | Halfback Pre-Modern Era: Two-Way Performer | Pittsburgh Steelers | 1942, 1945–1946 |
| Bill Dudley | 1966 | Halfback Pre-Modern Era: Two-Way Performer | Detroit Lions | 1947–1949 |
| Bill Dudley | 1966 | Halfback Pre-Modern Era: Two-Way Performer | Washington Redskins | 1950–1951, 1953 |
| Tony Dungy | 2016 | Coach | Tampa Bay Buccaneers | 1996–2001 |
| Tony Dungy | 2016 | Coach | Indianapolis Colts | 2002–2008 |
| Kenny Easley^^{[3]} | 2017 | Safety | Seattle Seahawks | 1981–1987 |
| Albert Glen "Turk" Edwards | 1969 | Tackle Pre-Modern Era: Two-Way Performer | Boston Braves/ Boston Redskins/ Washington Redskins | 1932–1940 |
| Carl Eller | 2004 | Defensive end | Minnesota Vikings | 1964–1978 |
| Carl Eller | 2004 | Defensive end | Seattle Seahawks | 1979 |
| John Elway** | 2004 | Quarterback | Denver Broncos | 1983–1998 |
| Weeb Ewbank | 1978 | Coach | Baltimore Colts | 1954–1962 |
| Weeb Ewbank | 1978 | Coach/general manager | New York Jets | 1963–1973 |
| Alan Faneca | 2021 | Guard | Pittsburgh Steelers | 1998–2007 |
| Alan Faneca | 2021 | Guard | New York Jets | 2008–2009 |
| Alan Faneca | 2021 | Guard | Arizona Cardinals | 2010 |
| Marshall Faulk** | 2011 | Running back | Indianapolis Colts | 1994–1998 |
| Marshall Faulk** | 2011 | Running back | St. Louis Rams | 1999–2005 |
| Brett Favre** | 2016 | Quarterback | Atlanta Falcons | 1991 |
| Brett Favre** | 2016 | Quarterback | Green Bay Packers | 1992–2007 |
| Brett Favre** | 2016 | Quarterback | New York Jets | 2008 |
| Brett Favre** | 2016 | Quarterback | Minnesota Vikings | 2009–2010 |
| Tom Fears ^ | 1970 | Wide receiver | Los Angeles Rams | 1948–1956 |
| Jim Finks ^ | 1995 | Team administrator | Minnesota Vikings | 1964–1973 |
| Jim Finks ^ | 1995 | Team administrator | Chicago Bears | 1974–1982 |
| Jim Finks ^ | 1995 | Team administrator | New Orleans Saints | 1986–1992 |
| Larry Fitzgerald** | 2026 | Wide receiver | Arizona Cardinals | 2004–2020 |
| Ray Flaherty ^^{[3]} | 1976 | End Pre-Modern Era: Two-Way Performer | New York Yankees (NFL) | 1927–1928 |
| Ray Flaherty ^^{[3]} | 1976 | End Pre-Modern Era: Two-Way Performer | New York Giants | 1928–1929, 1931–1935 |
| Ray Flaherty ^^{[3]} | 1976 | Coach | Boston/Washington Redskins | 1936–1942 |
| Ray Flaherty ^^{[3]} | 1976 | Coach | New York Yankees (AAFC) | 1946–1948 |
| Ray Flaherty ^^{[3]} | 1976 | Coach | Chicago Hornets (AAFC) | 1949 |
| Tom Flores | 2021 | Coach | Oakland/ Los Angeles Raiders | 1979–1987 |
| Tom Flores | 2021 | Coach | Seattle Seahawks | 1992–1994 |
| Len Ford | 1976 | Defensive end | Los Angeles Dons (AAFC) | 1948–1949 |
| Len Ford | 1976 | Defensive end | Cleveland Browns | 1950–1957 |
| Len Ford | 1976 | Defensive end | Green Bay Packers | 1958 |
| Dan Fortmann | 1965 | Guard Pre-Modern Era: Two-Way Performer | Chicago Bears | 1936–1943 |
| Dan Fouts** | 1993 | Quarterback | San Diego Chargers | 1973–1987 |
| Dwight Freeney | 2024 | Defensive end | Indianapolis Colts | 2002–2012 |
| Dwight Freeney | 2024 | Defensive end | San Diego Chargers | 2013–2014 |
| Dwight Freeney | 2024 | Defensive end | Arizona Cardinals | 2015 |
| Dwight Freeney | 2024 | Defensive end | Atlanta Falcons | 2016 |
| Dwight Freeney | 2024 | Defensive end | Seattle Seahawks | 2017 |
| Dwight Freeney | 2024 | Defensive end | Detroit Lions | 2017 |
| Benny Friedman ^^{[3]} | 2005 | Quarterback Pre-Modern Era: Two-Way Performer | Cleveland Bulldogs | 1927 |
| Benny Friedman ^^{[3]} | 2005 | Quarterback Pre-Modern Era: Two-Way Performer | Detroit Wolverines | 1928 |
| Benny Friedman ^^{[3]} | 2005 | Quarterback Pre-Modern Era: Two-Way Performer | New York Giants | 1929–1931 |
| Benny Friedman ^^{[3]} | 2005 | Quarterback Pre-Modern Era: Two-Way Performer | Brooklyn Dodgers | 1932–1934 |
| Antonio Gates | 2025 | Tight End | San Diego/Los Angeles Chargers | 2003–2018 |
| Frank Gatski^{[3]} | 1985 | Center | Cleveland Browns (AAFC/ NFL) | 1946–1956 |
| Frank Gatski^{[3]} | 1985 | Center | Detroit Lions | 1957 |
| Bill George | 1974 | Linebacker | Chicago Bears | 1952–1965 |
| Bill George | 1974 | Linebacker | Los Angeles Rams | 1966 |
| Joe Gibbs ^ | 1996 | Coach | Washington Redskins | 1981–1992, 2004–2007 |
| Frank Gifford | 1977 | Halfback/flanker | New York Giants | 1952–1960, 1962–1964 |
| Sid Gillman | 1983 | Coach | Los Angeles Rams | 1955–1959 |
| Sid Gillman | 1983 | Coach | Los Angeles/San Diego Chargers | 1960–1969, 1971 |
| Sid Gillman | 1983 | General manager | Los Angeles/San Diego Chargers | 1960–1970 |
| Sid Gillman | 1983 | Coach/general manager | Houston Oilers | 1973–1974 |
| Tony Gonzalez** | 2019 | Tight end | Kansas City Chiefs | 1997–2008 |
| Tony Gonzalez** | 2019 | Tight end | Atlanta Falcons | 2009–2013 |
| Randy Gradishar | 2024 | Linebacker | Denver Broncos | 1974–1983 |
| Otto Graham | 1965 | Quarterback | Cleveland Browns (AAFC/ NFL) | 1946–1955 |
| Harold "Red" Grange § | 1963 | Halfback Pre-Modern Era: Two-Way Performer | Chicago Bears | 1925, 1929–1934 |
| Harold "Red" Grange § | 1963 | Halfback Pre-Modern Era: Two-Way Performer | New York Yankees (AFL I) | 1926 |
| Harold "Red" Grange § | 1963 | Halfback Pre-Modern Era: Two-Way Performer | New York Yankees (NFL) | 1927 |
| Bud Grant | 1994 | Coach | Minnesota Vikings | 1967–1983, 1985 |
| Darrell Green** | 2008 | Cornerback | Washington Redskins | 1983–2002 |
| Joe Greene** | 1987 | Defensive tackle | Pittsburgh Steelers | 1969–1981 |
| Kevin Greene | 2016 | Linebacker | Los Angeles Rams | 1985–1992 |
| Kevin Greene | 2016 | Linebacker | Pittsburgh Steelers | 1993–1995 |
| Kevin Greene | 2016 | Linebacker | Carolina Panthers | 1996, 1998–1999 |
| Kevin Greene | 2016 | Linebacker | San Francisco 49ers | 1997 |
| Forrest Gregg** | 1977 | Offensive tackle/guard | Green Bay Packers | 1956, 1958–1970 |
| Forrest Gregg** | 1977 | Offensive tackle/guard | Dallas Cowboys | 1971 |
| Bob Griese | 1990 | Quarterback | Miami Dolphins | 1967–1980 |
| Russ Grimm | 2010 | Guard | Washington Redskins | 1981–1991 |
| Lou Groza | 1974 | Offensive tackle/kicker | Cleveland Browns (AAFC/ NFL) | 1946–1959, 1961–1967 |
| Ray Guy^{[3]} | 2014 | Punter | Oakland/ Los Angeles Raiders | 1973–1986 |
| Joe Guyon | 1966 | Halfback Pre-Modern Era: Two-Way Performer | Canton Bulldogs | 1919–1920 |
| Joe Guyon | 1966 | Halfback Pre-Modern Era: Two-Way Performer | Washington Senators | 1921 |
| Joe Guyon | 1966 | Halfback Pre-Modern Era: Two-Way Performer | Cleveland Indians | 1921 |
| Joe Guyon | 1966 | Halfback Pre-Modern Era: Two-Way Performer | Oorang Indians | 1922–1923 |
| Joe Guyon | 1966 | Halfback Pre-Modern Era: Two-Way Performer | Rock Island Independents | 1924 |
| Joe Guyon | 1966 | Halfback Pre-Modern Era: Two-Way Performer | Kansas City Cowboys | 1924–1925 |
| Joe Guyon | 1966 | Halfback Pre-Modern Era: Two-Way Performer | New York Giants | 1927 |
| George Halas § | 1963 | NFL co-organizer | n/a | 1920 |
| George Halas § | 1963 | Team owner | Decatur Staleys/ Chicago Staleys/ Chicago Bears | 1920–1983 |
| George Halas § | 1963 | End Pre-Modern Era: Two-Way Performer | Decatur Staleys/ Chicago Staleys/ Chicago Bears | 1920–1928 |
| George Halas § | 1963 | Coach | Decatur Staleys/ Chicago Staleys/ Chicago Bears | 1920–1929; 1933–1942; 1946–1955; 1958–1967 |
| Charles Haley | 2015 | Defensive end/linebacker | San Francisco 49ers | 1986–1991, 1998–1999 |
| Charles Haley | 2015 | Defensive end | Dallas Cowboys | 1992–1996 |
| Jack Ham** | 1988 | Outside linebacker | Pittsburgh Steelers | 1971–1982 |
| Dan Hampton | 2002 | Defensive tackle/end | Chicago Bears | 1979–1990 |
| Chris Hanburger ^^{[3]} | 2011 | Linebacker | Washington Redskins | 1965–1978 |
| John Hannah** | 1991 | Guard | New England Patriots | 1973–1985 |
| Cliff Harris †^{[3]} | 2020 | Free safety | Dallas Cowboys | 1970–1979 |
| Franco Harris** | 1990 | Running back | Pittsburgh Steelers | 1972–1983 |
| Franco Harris** | 1990 | Running back | Seattle Seahawks | 1984 |
| Marvin Harrison | 2016 | Wide receiver | Indianapolis Colts | 1996–2008 |
| Bob Hayes^{[3]} | 2009 | Wide receiver | Dallas Cowboys | 1965–1974 |
| Bob Hayes^{[3]} | 2009 | Wide receiver | San Francisco 49ers | 1975 |
| Mike Haynes | 1997 | Cornerback | New England Patriots | 1976–1982 |
| Mike Haynes | 1997 | Cornerback | Los Angeles Raiders | 1983–1989 |
| Ed Healey | 1964 | Tackle Pre-Modern Era: Two-Way Performer | Rock Island Independents | 1920–1922 |
| Ed Healey | 1964 | Tackle Pre-Modern Era: Two-Way Performer | Chicago Bears | 1922–1927 |
| Mel Hein § | 1963 | Center Pre-Modern Era: Two-Way Performer | New York Giants | 1931–1945 |
| Ted Hendricks | 1990 | Linebacker | Baltimore Colts | 1969–1973 |
| Ted Hendricks | 1990 | Linebacker | Green Bay Packers | 1974 |
| Ted Hendricks | 1990 | Linebacker | Oakland/ Los Angeles Raiders | 1975–1983 |
| Pete Henry § | 1963 | Tackle Pre-Modern Era: Two-Way Performer Punter; Kicker | Canton Bulldogs | 1920–1923, 1925–1926 |
| Pete Henry § | 1963 | Tackle Pre-Modern Era: Two-Way Performer Punter; Kicker | New York Giants | 1927 |
| Pete Henry § | 1963 | Tackle Pre-Modern Era: Two-Way Performer Punter; Kicker | Pottsville Maroons | 1927–1928 |
| Arnie Herber | 1966 | Quarterback Pre-Modern Era: Two-Way Performer | Green Bay Packers | 1930–1940 |
| Arnie Herber | 1966 | Quarterback Pre-Modern Era: Two-Way Performer | New York Giants | 1944–1945 |
| Devin Hester | 2024 | Wide receiver/return specialist | Chicago Bears | 2006–2013 |
| Devin Hester | 2024 | Wide receiver/return specialist | Atlanta Falcons | 2014–2015 |
| Devin Hester | 2024 | Wide receiver/return specialist | Baltimore Ravens | 2016 |
| Devin Hester | 2024 | Wide receiver/return specialist | Seattle Seahawks | 2016 |
| Bill Hewitt | 1971 | End Pre-Modern Era: Two-Way Performer | Chicago Bears | 1932–1936 |
| Bill Hewitt | 1971 | End Pre-Modern Era: Two-Way Performer | Philadelphia Eagles | 1937–1939, 1943 |
| Gene Hickerson^{[3]} | 2007 | Guard | Cleveland Browns | 1958–1973 |
| Winston Hill †^{[3]} | 2020 | Offensive tackle | New York Jets | 1963–1976 |
| Winston Hill †^{[3]} | 2020 | Offensive tackle | Los Angeles Rams | 1977 |
| Clarke Hinkle | 1964 | Fullback Pre-Modern Era: Two-Way Performer | Green Bay Packers | 1932–1941 |
| Clarke Hinkle | 1964 | Linebacker Pre-Modern Era: Two-Way Performer | Green Bay Packers | 1932–1941 |
| Elroy (Crazylegs) Hirsch | 1968 | Halfback | Chicago Rockets (AAFC) | 1946–1948 |
| Elroy (Crazylegs) Hirsch | 1968 | Flanker/halfback | Los Angeles Rams | 1949–1957 |
| Paul Hornung ^{[4]} | 1986 | Halfback/placekicker | Green Bay Packers | 1957–1962, 1964–1966 |
| Ken Houston** | 1986 | Safety | Houston Oilers | 1967–1972 |
| Ken Houston** | 1986 | Safety | Washington Redskins | 1973–1980 |
| Chuck Howley ^^{[3]} | 2023 | Linebacker | Chicago Bears | 1958–1959 |
| Chuck Howley ^^{[3]} | 2023 | Linebacker | Dallas Cowboys | 1961–1973 |
| Cal Hubbard § | 1963 | Tackle Pre-Modern Era: Two-Way Performer | New York Giants | 1927–1928, 1936 |
| Cal Hubbard § | 1963 | Tackle Pre-Modern Era: Two-Way Performer | Green Bay Packers | 1929–1933, 1935 |
| Cal Hubbard § | 1963 | Tackle Pre-Modern Era: Two-Way Performer | Pittsburgh Pirates | 1936 |
| Sam Huff | 1982 | Linebacker | New York Giants | 1956–1963 |
| Sam Huff | 1982 | Linebacker | Washington Redskins | 1964–1967, 1969 |
| Claude Humphrey^{[3]} | 2014 | Defensive end | Atlanta Falcons | 1968–1974; 1976–1978 |
| Claude Humphrey^{[3]} | 2014 | Defensive end | Philadelphia Eagles | 1979–1981 |
| Lamar Hunt ^ | 1972 | AFL co-founder | n/a | 1959 |
| Lamar Hunt ^ | 1972 | Team owner | Dallas Texans (AFL)/ Kansas City Chiefs | 1959–2006 |
| Steve Hutchinson | 2020 | Guard | Seattle Seahawks | 2001–2005 |
| Steve Hutchinson | 2020 | Guard | Minnesota Vikings | 2006–2011 |
| Steve Hutchinson | 2020 | Guard | Tennessee Titans | 2012 |
| Don Hutson § | 1963 | Offensive end Pre-Modern Era: Two-Way Performer | Green Bay Packers | 1935–1945 |
| Don Hutson § | 1963 | Safety Pre-Modern Era: Two-Way Performer | Green Bay Packers | 1935–1945 |
| Don Hutson § | 1963 | Placekicker | Green Bay Packers | 1935–1945 |
| Michael Irvin | 2007 | Wide receiver | Dallas Cowboys | 1988–1999 |
| Rickey Jackson ^ | 2010 | Linebacker/defensive end | New Orleans Saints | 1981–1993 |
| Rickey Jackson ^ | 2010 | Linebacker/defensive end | San Francisco 49ers | 1994–1995 |
| Edgerrin James | 2020 | Running back | Indianapolis Colts | 1999–2005 |
| Edgerrin James | 2020 | Running back | Arizona Cardinals | 2006–2008 |
| Edgerrin James | 2020 | Running back | Seattle Seahawks | 2009 |
| Andre Johnson | 2024 | Wide receiver | Houston Texans | 2003–2014 |
| Andre Johnson | 2024 | Wide receiver | Indianapolis Colts | 2015 |
| Andre Johnson | 2024 | Wide receiver | Tennessee Titans | 2016 |
| Calvin Johnson** | 2021 | Wide receiver | Detroit Lions | 2007–2015 |
| Jimmy Johnson ^ | 1994 | Cornerback | San Francisco 49ers | 1961–1976 |
| Jimmy Johnson † | 2020 | Coach | Dallas Cowboys | 1989–1993 |
| Jimmy Johnson † | 2020 | Coach | Miami Dolphins | 1996–1999 |
| John Henry Johnson^{[3]} | 1987 | Fullback | San Francisco 49ers | 1954–1956 |
| John Henry Johnson^{[3]} | 1987 | Fullback | Detroit Lions | 1957–1959 |
| John Henry Johnson^{[3]} | 1987 | Fullback | Pittsburgh Steelers | 1960–1965 |
| John Henry Johnson^{[3]} | 1987 | Fullback | Houston Oilers | 1966 |
| Charlie Joiner | 1996 | Wide receiver | Houston Oilers | 1969–1972 |
| Charlie Joiner | 1996 | Wide receiver | Cincinnati Bengals | 1972–1975 |
| Charlie Joiner | 1996 | Wide receiver | San Diego Chargers | 1976–1986 |
| Deacon Jones** | 1980 | Defensive end | Los Angeles Rams | 1961–1971 |
| Deacon Jones** | 1980 | Defensive end | San Diego Chargers | 1972–1973 |
| Deacon Jones** | 1980 | Defensive end | Washington Redskins | 1974 |
| Jerry Jones^ | 2017 | Team owner, president, general manager | Dallas Cowboys | 1989–present |
| Stan Jones ^^{[3]} | 1991 | Offensive tackle/guard | Chicago Bears | 1954–1962 |
| Stan Jones ^^{[3]} | 1991 | Defensive tackle | Chicago Bears | 1962–1965 |
| Stan Jones ^^{[3]} | 1991 | Defensive tackle | Washington Redskins | 1966 |
| Walter Jones** | 2014 | Offensive tackle | Seattle Seahawks | 1997–2008 |
| Henry Jordan^{[3]} | 1995 | Defensive tackle | Cleveland Browns | 1957–1958 |
| Henry Jordan^{[3]} | 1995 | Defensive tackle | Green Bay Packers | 1959–1969 |
| Sonny Jurgensen | 1983 | Quarterback | Philadelphia Eagles | 1957–1963 |
| Sonny Jurgensen | 1983 | Quarterback | Washington Redskins | 1964–1974 |
| Alex Karras †^{[3]} | 2020 | Defensive tackle | Detroit Lions | 1958–1962; 1964–1970 |
| Jim Kelly** | 2002 | Quarterback | Buffalo Bills | 1986–1996 |
| Leroy Kelly^{[3]} | 1994 | Running back | Cleveland Browns | 1964–1973 |
| Cortez Kennedy | 2012 | Defensive tackle | Seattle Seahawks | 1990–2000 |
| Walt Kiesling | 1966 | Guard Pre-Modern Era: Two-Way Performer | Duluth Eskimos | 1926–1927 |
| Walt Kiesling | 1966 | Guard Pre-Modern Era: Two-Way Performer | Pottsville Maroons | 1928 |
| Walt Kiesling | 1966 | Guard Pre-Modern Era: Two-Way Performer | Chicago Cardinals | 1929–1933 |
| Walt Kiesling | 1966 | Guard Pre-Modern Era: Two-Way Performer | Chicago Bears | 1934 |
| Walt Kiesling | 1966 | Guard Pre-Modern Era: Two-Way Performer | Green Bay Packers | 1935–1936 |
| Walt Kiesling | 1966 | Guard Pre-Modern Era: Two-Way Performer | Pittsburgh Pirates | 1937–1938 |
| Walt Kiesling | 1966 | Coach | Pittsburgh Pirates/ Steelers | 1939–1942; 1954–1956 |
| Walt Kiesling | 1966 | Coach | Steagles | 1943 |
| Walt Kiesling | 1966 | Coach | Card-Pitt | 1944 |
| Frank "Bruiser" Kinard | 1971 | Tackle Pre-Modern Era: Two-Way Performer | Brooklyn Dodgers/ Tigers | 1938–1944 |
| Frank "Bruiser" Kinard | 1971 | Tackle Pre-Modern Era: Two-Way Performer | New York Yankees (AAFC) | 1946–1947 |
| Joe Klecko ^^{[3]} | 2023 | Defensive end/defensive tackle/nose tackle | New York Jets | 1977–1987 |
| Joe Klecko ^^{[3]} | 2023 | Defensive end/defensive tackle/nose tackle | Indianapolis Colts | 1988 |
| Jerry Kramer ^{[3]} | 2018 | Guard | Green Bay Packers | 1958–1968 |
| Paul Krause | 1998 | Safety | Washington Redskins | 1964–1967 |
| Paul Krause | 1998 | Safety | Minnesota Vikings | 1968–1979 |
| Luke Kuechly | 2026 | Linebacker | Carolina Panthers | 2012–2019 |
| Earl "Curly" Lambeau § | 1963 | Founder | Green Bay Packers | 1919 |
| Earl "Curly" Lambeau § | 1963 | Halfback Pre-Modern Era: Two-Way Performer | Green Bay Packers | 1919–1929 |
| Earl "Curly" Lambeau § | 1963 | Coach | Green Bay Packers | 1919–1949 |
| Earl "Curly" Lambeau § | 1963 | General manager | Green Bay Packers | 1919–1949 |
| Earl "Curly" Lambeau § | 1963 | Coach | Chicago Cardinals | 1950–1951 |
| Earl "Curly" Lambeau § | 1963 | Coach | Washington Redskins | 1952–1953 |
| Jack Lambert** | 1990 | Middle linebacker | Pittsburgh Steelers | 1974–1984 |
| Tom Landry** | 1990 | Coach | Dallas Cowboys | 1960–1988 |
| Dick "Night Train" Lane | 1974 | Cornerback | Los Angeles Rams | 1952–1953 |
| Dick "Night Train" Lane | 1974 | Cornerback | Chicago Cardinals | 1954–1959 |
| Dick "Night Train" Lane | 1974 | Cornerback | Detroit Lions | 1960–1965 |
| Jim Langer** | 1987 | Center | Miami Dolphins | 1970–1979 |
| Jim Langer** | 1987 | Center | Minnesota Vikings | 1980–1981 |
| Willie Lanier | 1986 | Middle linebacker | Kansas City Chiefs | 1967–1977 |
| Steve Largent** | 1995 | Wide receiver | Seattle Seahawks | 1976–1989 |
| Yale Lary | 1979 | Safety/punter | Detroit Lions | 1952–1953, 1956–1964 |
| Dante Lavelli | 1975 | Offensive end | Cleveland Browns (AAFC/ NFL) | 1946–1956 |
| Ty Law | 2019 | Cornerback | New England Patriots | 1995–2004 |
| Ty Law | 2019 | Cornerback | New York Jets | 2005, 2008 |
| Ty Law | 2019 | Cornerback | Kansas City Chiefs | 2006–2007 |
| Ty Law | 2019 | Cornerback | Denver Broncos | 2009 |
| Bobby Layne** | 1967 | Quarterback/placekicker | Chicago Bears | 1948 |
| Bobby Layne** | 1967 | Quarterback/placekicker | New York Bulldogs | 1949 |
| Bobby Layne** | 1967 | Quarterback/placekicker | Detroit Lions | 1950–1958 |
| Bobby Layne** | 1967 | Quarterback/placekicker | Pittsburgh Steelers | 1958–1962 |
| Dick LeBeau ^^{[3]} | 2010 | Cornerback | Detroit Lions | 1959–1972 |
| Alphonse "Tuffy" Leemans^^{[3]} | 1978 | Halfback/fullback Pre-Modern Era: Two-Way Performer | New York Giants | 1936–1943 |
| Alphonse "Tuffy" Leemans^^{[3]} | 1978 | Coach/halfback/fullback Pre-Modern Era: Two-Way Performer | New York Giants | 1943 |
| Marv Levy | 2001 | Coach | Kansas City Chiefs | 1978–1982 |
| Marv Levy | 2001 | Coach | Buffalo Bills | 1986–1997 |
| Ray Lewis** | 2018 | Middle linebacker | Baltimore Ravens | 1996–2012 |
| Bob Lilly** | 1980 | Defensive tackle | Dallas Cowboys | 1961–1974 |
| Floyd Little ^^{[3]} | 2010 | Running back | Denver Broncos | 1967–1975 |
| Larry Little | 1993 | Guard | San Diego Chargers | 1967–1968 |
| Larry Little | 1993 | Guard | Miami Dolphins | 1969–1980 |
| James Lofton | 2003 | Wide receiver | Green Bay Packers | 1978–1986 |
| James Lofton | 2003 | Wide receiver | Los Angeles Raiders | 1987–1988 |
| James Lofton | 2003 | Wide receiver | Buffalo Bills | 1989–1992 |
| James Lofton | 2003 | Wide receiver | Los Angeles Rams | 1993 |
| James Lofton | 2003 | Wide receiver | Philadelphia Eagles | 1993 |
| Vince Lombardi ^ | 1971 | General manager | Green Bay Packers | 1959–1968 |
| Vince Lombardi ^ | 1971 | Coach | Green Bay Packers | 1959–1967 |
| Vince Lombardi ^ | 1971 | Coach | Washington Redskins | 1969 |
| Howie Long | 2000 | Defensive end | Oakland/ Los Angeles Raiders | 1981–1993 |
| Ronnie Lott** | 2000 | Cornerback/safety | San Francisco 49ers | 1981–1990 |
| Ronnie Lott** | 2000 | Cornerback/safety | Los Angeles Raiders | 1991–1992 |
| Ronnie Lott** | 2000 | Cornerback/safety | New York Jets | 1993–1994 |
| Sid Luckman | 1965 | Quarterback Pre-Modern Era: Two-Way Performer | Chicago Bears | 1939–1950 |
| William R. Lyman | 1964 | Tackle Pre-Modern Era: Two-Way Performer | Canton Bulldogs | 1922–23, 1925 |
| William R. Lyman | 1964 | Tackle Pre-Modern Era: Two-Way Performer | Cleveland Bulldogs | 1924 |
| William R. Lyman | 1964 | Tackle Pre-Modern Era: Two-Way Performer | Frankford Yellow Jackets | 1925 |
| William R. Lyman | 1964 | Tackle Pre-Modern Era: Two-Way Performer | Chicago Bears | 1926–1934 |
| John Lynch | 2021 | Safety | Tampa Bay Buccaneers | 1993–2003 |
| John Lynch | 2021 | Safety | Denver Broncos | 2004–2007 |
| Tom Mack | 1999 | Guard | Los Angeles Rams | 1966–1978 |
| John Mackey | 1992 | Tight end | Baltimore Colts | 1963–1971 |
| John Mackey | 1992 | Tight end | San Diego Chargers | 1972 |
| John Madden^{[3]} | 2006 | Coach | Oakland Raiders | 1969–1978 |
| Peyton Manning** | 2021 | Quarterback | Indianapolis Colts | 1998–2011 |
| Peyton Manning** | 2021 | Quarterback | Denver Broncos | 2012–2015 |
| Tim Mara § | 1963 | Team owner/founder | New York Giants | 1925–1959 |
| Wellington Mara | 1997 | Team owner/team administrator | New York Giants | 1937–2005 |
| Gino Marchetti** | 1972 | Defensive end | Dallas Texans (NFL) | 1952 |
| Gino Marchetti** | 1972 | Defensive end | Baltimore Colts | 1953–1964, 1966 |
| Dan Marino** | 2005 | Quarterback | Miami Dolphins | 1983–1999 |
| George Preston Marshall § | 1963 | Team owner/founder | Boston Braves/ Boston Redskins/ Washington Redskins | 1932–1969 |
| Curtis Martin | 2012 | Running back | New England Patriots | 1995–1997 |
| Curtis Martin | 2012 | Running back | New York Jets | 1998–2005 |
| Ollie Matson** | 1972 | Halfback | Chicago Cardinals | 1952, 1954–1958 |
| Ollie Matson** | 1972 | Halfback | Los Angeles Rams | 1959–1962 |
| Ollie Matson** | 1972 | Halfback | Detroit Lions | 1963 |
| Ollie Matson** | 1972 | Halfback | Philadelphia Eagles | 1964–1966 |
| Bruce Matthews** | 2007 | Guard; Center; Tackle | Houston Oilers/ Tennessee Oilers/ Tennessee Titans | 1983–2001 |
| Kevin Mawae | 2019 | Center/guard | Seattle Seahawks | 1994–1997 |
| Kevin Mawae | 2019 | Center/guard | New York Jets | 1998–2005 |
| Kevin Mawae | 2019 | Center/guard | Tennessee Titans | 2006–2009 |
| Don Maynard | 1987 | Wide receiver | New York Giants | 1958 |
| Don Maynard | 1987 | Wide receiver | New York Titans/ Jets (AFL) | 1960–1972 |
| Don Maynard | 1987 | Wide receiver | St. Louis Cardinals | 1973 |
| George McAfee | 1966 | Halfback Pre-Modern Era: Two-Way Performer | Chicago Bears | 1940–1941, 1945–1950 |
| Mike McCormack | 1984 | Offensive tackle | New York Yanks | 1951 |
| Mike McCormack | 1984 | Defensive lineman | Cleveland Browns | 1954 |
| Mike McCormack | 1984 | Offensive tackle | Cleveland Browns | 1955–1962 |
| Randall McDaniel | 2009 | Guard | Minnesota Vikings | 1988–1999 |
| Randall McDaniel | 2009 | Guard | Tampa Bay Buccaneers | 2000–2001 |
| Tommy McDonald^{[3]} | 1998 | Wide receiver | Philadelphia Eagles | 1957–1963 |
| Tommy McDonald^{[3]} | 1998 | Wide receiver | Dallas Cowboys | 1964 |
| Tommy McDonald^{[3]} | 1998 | Wide receiver | Los Angeles Rams | 1965–1966 |
| Tommy McDonald^{[3]} | 1998 | Wide receiver | Atlanta Falcons | 1967 |
| Tommy McDonald^{[3]} | 1998 | Wide receiver | Cleveland Browns | 1968 |
| Hugh McElhenny** | 1970 | Halfback | San Francisco 49ers | 1952–1960 |
| Hugh McElhenny** | 1970 | Halfback | Minnesota Vikings | 1961–1962 |
| Hugh McElhenny** | 1970 | Halfback | New York Giants | 1963 |
| Hugh McElhenny** | 1970 | Halfback | Detroit Lions | 1964 |
| Steve McMichael | 2024 | Defensive tackle | New England Patriots | 1980 |
| Steve McMichael | 2024 | Defensive tackle | Chicago Bears | 1981–1993 |
| Steve McMichael | 2024 | Defensive tackle | Green Bay Packers | 1994 |
| Art McNally | 2022 | Supervisor of officials | n/a | 1968–1990 |
| Mike Michalske | 1964 | Guard Pre-Modern Era: Two-Way Performer | New York Yankees (AFL I) | 1926 |
| Mike Michalske | 1964 | Guard Pre-Modern Era: Two-Way Performer | New York Yankees (NFL) | 1927–1928 |
| Mike Michalske | 1964 | Guard Pre-Modern Era: Two-Way Performer | Green Bay Packers | 1929–1935, 1937 |
| Wayne Millner | 1968 | End Pre-Modern Era: Two-Way Performer | Boston/Washington Redskins | 1936–1941, 1945 |
| Wayne Millner | 1968 | Coach/end Pre-Modern Era: Two-Way Performer | Boston/Washington Redskins | 1945 |
| Sam Mills | 2022 | Linebacker | New Orleans Saints | 1986–1994 |
| Sam Mills | 2022 | Linebacker | Carolina Panthers | 1995–1997 |
| Bobby Mitchell ^ | 1983 | Flanker/halfback/kickoff/punt returner | Cleveland Browns | 1958–1961 |
| Bobby Mitchell ^ | 1983 | Flanker/halfback/kickoff/punt returner | Washington Redskins | 1962–1968 |
| Ron Mix ^ | 1979 | Offensive tackle | Los Angeles/San Diego Chargers | 1960–1969 |
| Ron Mix ^ | 1979 | Offensive tackle | Oakland Raiders | 1971 |
| Art Monk | 2008 | Wide receiver | Washington Redskins | 1980–1993 |
| Art Monk | 2008 | Wide receiver | New York Jets | 1994 |
| Art Monk | 2008 | Wide receiver | Philadelphia Eagles | 1995 |
| Joe Montana** | 2000 | Quarterback | San Francisco 49ers | 1979–1992 |
| Joe Montana** | 2000 | Quarterback | Kansas City Chiefs | 1993–1994 |
| Warren Moon** | 2006 | Quarterback | Houston Oilers | 1984–1993 |
| Warren Moon** | 2006 | Quarterback | Minnesota Vikings | 1994–1996 |
| Warren Moon** | 2006 | Quarterback | Seattle Seahawks | 1997–1998 |
| Warren Moon** | 2006 | Quarterback | Kansas City Chiefs | 1999–2000 |
| Lenny Moore | 1975 | Halfback | Baltimore Colts | 1956–1967 |
| Randy Moss** | 2018 | Wide receiver | Minnesota Vikings | 1998–2004, 2010 |
| Randy Moss** | 2018 | Wide receiver | Oakland Raiders | 2005–2006 |
| Randy Moss** | 2018 | Wide receiver | New England Patriots | 2007–2010 |
| Randy Moss** | 2018 | Wide receiver | Tennessee Titans | 2010 |
| Randy Moss** | 2018 | Wide receiver | San Francisco 49ers | 2012 |
| Marion Motley | 1968 | Fullback | Cleveland Browns (AAFC/ NFL) | 1946–1953 |
| Marion Motley | 1968 | Fullback | Pittsburgh Steelers | 1955 |
| Mike Munchak | 2001 | Guard | Houston Oilers | 1982–1993 |
| Anthony Muñoz** | 1998 | Offensive tackle | Cincinnati Bengals | 1980–1992 |
| George Musso ^^{[3]} | 1982 | Tackle, Guard Pre-Modern Era: Two-Way Performer | Chicago Bears | 1933–1944 |
| Bronko Nagurski § | 1963 | Fullback Pre-Modern Era: Two-Way Performer | Chicago Bears | 1930–1937, 1943 |
| Bronko Nagurski § | 1963 | Linebacker Pre-Modern Era: Two-Way Performer | Chicago Bears | 1930–1937, 1943 |
| Joe Namath | 1985 | Quarterback | New York Jets | 1965–1976 |
| Joe Namath | 1985 | Quarterback | Los Angeles Rams | 1977 |
| Greasy Neale | 1969 | Coach | Philadelphia Eagles | 1941–1950 |
| Ernie Nevers § | 1963 | Fullback Pre-Modern Era: Two-Way Performer | Duluth Eskimos | 1926–1927 |
| Ernie Nevers § | 1963 | Coach/fullback Pre-Modern Era: Two-Way Performer | Duluth Eskimos | 1927 |
| Ernie Nevers § | 1963 | Fullback Pre-Modern Era: Two-Way Performer | Chicago Cardinals | 1929–1931 |
| Ernie Nevers § | 1963 | Coach/fullback Pre-Modern Era: Two-Way Performer | Chicago Cardinals | 1930–1931 |
| Ernie Nevers § | 1963 | Coach | Chicago Cardinals | 1939 |
| Ozzie Newsome | 1999 | Tight end | Cleveland Browns | 1978–1990 |
| Ray Nitschke** | 1978 | Middle linebacker | Green Bay Packers | 1958–1972 |
| Chuck Noll** | 1993 | Coach | Pittsburgh Steelers | 1969–1991 |
| Leo Nomellini | 1969 | Defensive tackle | San Francisco 49ers | 1950–1963 |
| Bill Nunn ^ | 2021 | Scout | Pittsburgh Steelers | 1968–2014 |
| Jonathan Ogden** | 2013 | Offensive tackle | Baltimore Ravens | 1996–2007 |
| Merlin Olsen** | 1982 | Defensive tackle | Los Angeles Rams | 1962–1976 |
| Jim Otto** | 1980 | Center | Oakland Raiders | 1960–1974 |
| Steve Owen | 1966 | Tackle Pre-Modern Era: Two-Way Performer | Kansas City Cowboys | 1924–1925 |
| Steve Owen | 1966 | Tackle Pre-Modern Era: Two-Way Performer | Cleveland Bulldogs | 1925 |
| Steve Owen | 1966 | Tackle Pre-Modern Era: Two-Way Performer | New York Giants | 1926–1931, 1933 |
| Steve Owen | 1966 | Coach | New York Giants | 1930–1953 |
| Terrell Owens | 2018 | Wide receiver | San Francisco 49ers | 1996–2003 |
| Terrell Owens | 2018 | Wide receiver | Philadelphia Eagles | 2004–2005 |
| Terrell Owens | 2018 | Wide receiver | Dallas Cowboys | 2006–2008 |
| Terrell Owens | 2018 | Wide receiver | Buffalo Bills | 2009 |
| Terrell Owens | 2018 | Wide receiver | Cincinnati Bengals | 2010 |
| Orlando Pace | 2016 | Offensive tackle | St. Louis Rams | 1997–2008 |
| Orlando Pace | 2016 | Offensive tackle | Chicago Bears | 2009 |
| Alan Page | 1988 | Defensive tackle | Minnesota Vikings | 1967–1978 |
| Alan Page | 1988 | Defensive tackle | Chicago Bears | 1978–1981 |
| Bill Parcells | 2013 | Coach | New York Giants | 1983–1990 |
| Bill Parcells | 2013 | Coach | New England Patriots | 1993–1996 |
| Bill Parcells | 2013 | Coach | New York Jets | 1997–1999 |
| Bill Parcells | 2013 | Coach | Dallas Cowboys | 2003–2006 |
| Ace Parker ^^{[3]} | 1972 | Quarterback Pre-Modern Era: Two-Way Performer | Brooklyn Dodgers | 1937–1941 |
| Ace Parker ^^{[3]} | 1972 | Quarterback Pre-Modern Era: Two-Way Performer | Yanks | 1945 |
| Ace Parker ^^{[3]} | 1972 | Quarterback Pre-Modern Era: Two-Way Performer | New York Yankees (AAFC) | 1946 |
| Jim Parker** | 1973 | Guard/tackle | Baltimore Colts | 1957–1967 |
| Walter Payton** | 1993 | Running back | Chicago Bears | 1975–1987 |
| Drew Pearson ^{[3]} | 2021 | Wide receiver | Dallas Cowboys | 1973–1983 |
| Julius Peppers** | 2024 | Defensive end | Carolina Panthers | 2002–2009, 2017–2018 |
| Julius Peppers** | 2024 | Defensive end | Chicago Bears | 2010–2013 |
| Julius Peppers** | 2024 | Defensive end | Green Bay Packers | 2014–2016 |
| Joe Perry | 1969 | Fullback | San Francisco 49ers (AAFC/NFL) | 1948–1960, 1963 |
| Joe Perry | 1969 | Fullback | Baltimore Colts | 1961–1962 |
| Pete Pihos ^ | 1970 | End Pre-Modern Era: Two-Way Performer | Philadelphia Eagles | 1947–1955 |
| Troy Polamalu** | 2020 | Safety | Pittsburgh Steelers | 2003–2014 |
| Bill Polian | 2015 | General manager | Buffalo Bills | 1986–1992 |
| Bill Polian | 2015 | General manager | Carolina Panthers | 1995–1997 |
| Bill Polian | 2015 | General manager | Indianapolis Colts | 1998–2008 |
| Bill Polian | 2015 | Team president | Indianapolis Colts | 1998–2011 |
| Fritz Pollard ^^{[3]} | 2005 | Halfback Pre-Modern Era: Two-Way Performer | Akron Pros/ Indians (1919 pre-NFL) | 1919–1921, 1925–1926 |
| Fritz Pollard ^^{[3]} | 2005 | Halfback Pre-Modern Era: Two-Way Performer | Milwaukee Badgers | 1922 |
| Fritz Pollard ^^{[3]} | 2005 | Halfback Pre-Modern Era: Two-Way Performer | Hammond Pros | 1923, 1925 |
| Fritz Pollard ^^{[3]} | 2005 | Halfback Pre-Modern Era: Two-Way Performer | Providence Steam Roller | 1925 |
| Fritz Pollard ^^{[3]} | 2005 | Coach ^{[5]} | Akron Pros ^{[5]} | 1921 |
| Fritz Pollard ^^{[3]} | 2005 | Coach ^{[5]} | Hammond Pros | 1925 |
| John Randle | 2010 | Defensive tackle | Minnesota Vikings | 1990–2000 |
| John Randle | 2010 | Defensive tackle | Seattle Seahawks | 2001–2003 |
| Hugh "Shorty" Ray | 1966 | Technical advisor on rules, Supervisor of officials | n/a | 1938–1952 |
| Andre Reed | 2014 | Wide receiver | Buffalo Bills | 1985–1999 |
| Andre Reed | 2014 | Wide receiver | Washington Redskins | 2000 |
| Ed Reed** | 2019 | Free safety | Baltimore Ravens | 2002–2012 |
| Ed Reed** | 2019 | Free safety | New York Jets | 2013 |
| Ed Reed** | 2019 | Free safety | Houston Texans | 2013 |
| Dan Reeves | 1967 | Team owner | Cleveland/ Los Angeles Rams | 1941–1971 |
| Mel Renfro | 1996 | Safety/cornerback | Dallas Cowboys | 1964–1977 |
| Darrelle Revis** | 2023 | Cornerback | New York Jets | 2007–2012, 2015–2016 |
| Darrelle Revis** | 2023 | Cornerback | Tampa Bay Buccaneers | 2013 |
| Darrelle Revis** | 2023 | Cornerback | New England Patriots | 2014 |
| Darrelle Revis** | 2023 | Cornerback | Kansas City Chiefs | 2017 |
| Jerry Rice** | 2010 | Wide receiver | San Francisco 49ers | 1985–2000 |
| Jerry Rice** | 2010 | Wide receiver | Oakland Raiders | 2001–2004 |
| Jerry Rice** | 2010 | Wide receiver | Seattle Seahawks | 2004 |
| Les Richter ^^{[3]} | 2011 | Linebacker/center/kicker | Los Angeles Rams | 1954–1962 |
| John Riggins | 1992 | Running back | New York Jets | 1971–1975 |
| John Riggins | 1992 | Running back | Washington Redskins | 1976–1979, 1981–1985 |
| Ken Riley ^^{[3]} | 2023 | Cornerback | Cincinnati Bengals | 1969–1983 |
| Jim Ringo | 1981 | Center | Green Bay Packers | 1953–1963 |
| Jim Ringo | 1981 | Center | Philadelphia Eagles | 1964–1967 |
| Willie Roaf | 2012 | Offensive tackle | New Orleans Saints | 1993–2001 |
| Willie Roaf | 2012 | Offensive tackle | Kansas City Chiefs | 2002–2005 |
| Dave Robinson ^^{[3]} | 2013 | Linebacker | Green Bay Packers | 1963–1972 |
| Dave Robinson ^^{[3]} | 2013 | Linebacker | Washington Redskins | 1973–1974 |
| Johnny Robinson | 2019 | Safety | Dallas Texans (AFL)/ Kansas City Chiefs | 1960–1971 |
| Andy Robustelli | 1971 | Defensive end | Los Angeles Rams | 1951–1955 |
| Andy Robustelli | 1971 | Defensive end | New York Giants | 1956–1964 |
| Art Rooney | 1964 | Team owner/founder | Pittsburgh Pirates/ Steelers | 1933–1988 |
| Dan Rooney | 2000 | Team owner | Pittsburgh Steelers | 1955–2017 |
| Dan Rooney | 2000 | Team administrator | Pittsburgh Steelers | 1955–2003 |
| Pete Rozelle | 1985 | General manager | Los Angeles Rams | 1957–1959 |
| Pete Rozelle | 1985 | NFL commissioner | n/a | 1960–1989 |
| Ed Sabol ^ | 2011 | Founder of NFL Films | n/a | 1964–1995 |
| Steve Sabol † | 2020 | NFL Films co-founder | n/a | 1964–2012 |
| Barry Sanders**^{[4]} | 2004 | Running back | Detroit Lions | 1989–1998 |
| Charlie Sanders ^^{[3]} | 2007 | Tight end | Detroit Lions | 1968–1977 |
| Deion Sanders** | 2011 | Cornerback/kick returner | Atlanta Falcons | 1989–1993 |
| Deion Sanders** | 2011 | Cornerback/kick returner | San Francisco 49ers | 1994 |
| Deion Sanders** | 2011 | Cornerback/kick returner | Dallas Cowboys | 1995–1999 |
| Deion Sanders** | 2011 | Cornerback/kick returner | Washington Redskins | 2000 |
| Deion Sanders** | 2011 | Cornerback/kick returner | Baltimore Ravens | 2004–2005 |
| Warren Sapp** | 2013 | Defensive tackle | Tampa Bay Buccaneers | 1995–2003 |
| Warren Sapp** | 2013 | Defensive tackle | Oakland Raiders | 2004–2007 |
| Gale Sayers** | 1977 | Halfback | Chicago Bears | 1965–1971 |
| Joe Schmidt | 1973 | Linebacker | Detroit Lions | 1953–1965 |
| Tex Schramm ^ | 1991 | Team administrator | Los Angeles Rams | 1947–1956 |
| Tex Schramm ^ | 1991 | Team administrator | Dallas Cowboys | 1960–1989 |
| Junior Seau | 2015 | Linebacker | San Diego Chargers | 1990–2002 |
| Junior Seau | 2015 | Linebacker | Miami Dolphins | 2003–2005 |
| Junior Seau | 2015 | Linebacker | New England Patriots | 2006–2009 |
| Lee Roy Selmon ^ | 1995 | Defensive end | Tampa Bay Buccaneers | 1976–1984 |
| Richard Seymour | 2022 | Defensive end/tackle | New England Patriots | 2001–2008 |
| Richard Seymour | 2022 | Defensive end/tackle | Oakland Raiders | 2009–2012 |
| Sterling Sharpe ^^{[3]} | 2025 | Wide receiver | Green Bay Packers | 1988–1994 |
| Shannon Sharpe | 2011 | Tight end | Denver Broncos | 1990–1999, 2002–2003 |
| Shannon Sharpe | 2011 | Tight end | Baltimore Ravens | 2000–2001 |
| Billy Shaw ^^{[3]} | 1999 | Guard | Buffalo Bills (AFL) | 1961–1969 |
| Art Shell | 1989 | Offensive tackle | Oakland/ Los Angeles Raiders | 1968–1982 |
| Donnie Shell †^{[3]} | 2020 | Defensive back | Pittsburgh Steelers | 1974–1987 |
| Will Shields | 2015 | Guard | Kansas City Chiefs | 1993–2006 |
| Don Shula** | 1997 | Coach | Baltimore Colts | 1963–1969 |
| Don Shula** | 1997 | Coach | Miami Dolphins | 1970–1995 |
| O. J. Simpson** ^{[4]} | 1985 | Running back | Buffalo Bills | 1969–1977 |
| O. J. Simpson** ^{[4]} | 1985 | Running back | San Francisco 49ers | 1978–1979 |
| Mike Singletary** | 1998 | Middle linebacker | Chicago Bears | 1981–1992 |
| Duke Slater †^{[3]} | 2020 | Tackle Pre-Modern Era: Two-Way Performer | Milwaukee Badgers | 1922 |
| Duke Slater †^{[3]} | 2020 | Tackle Pre-Modern Era: Two-Way Performer | Rock Island Independents | 1922–1925 |
| Duke Slater †^{[3]} | 2020 | Tackle Pre-Modern Era: Two-Way Performer | Chicago Cardinals | 1926–1931 |
| Jackie Slater** | 2001 | Offensive tackle | Los Angeles/ St. Louis Rams | 1976–1995 |
| Bruce Smith** | 2009 | Defensive end | Buffalo Bills | 1985–1999 |
| Bruce Smith** | 2009 | Defensive end | Washington Redskins | 2000–2003 |
| Emmitt Smith** | 2010 | Running back | Dallas Cowboys | 1990–2002 |
| Emmitt Smith** | 2010 | Running back | Arizona Cardinals | 2003–2004 |
| Jackie Smith | 1994 | Tight end | St. Louis Cardinals | 1963–1977 |
| Jackie Smith | 1994 | Tight end | Dallas Cowboys | 1978 |
| Mac Speedie †^{[3]} | 2020 | End | Cleveland Browns | 1946–1952 |
| Ed Sprinkle †^{[3]} | 2020 | End Pre-Modern Era: Two-Way Performer | Chicago Bears | 1944–1955 |
| Bob St. Clair ^^{[3]} | 1990 | Offensive tackle | San Francisco 49ers | 1953–1963 |
| Ken Stabler^{[3]} | 2016 | Quarterback | Oakland Raiders | 1970–1979 |
| Ken Stabler^{[3]} | 2016 | Quarterback | Houston Oilers | 1980–1981 |
| Ken Stabler^{[3]} | 2016 | Quarterback | New Orleans Saints | 1982–1984 |
| John Stallworth | 2002 | Wide receiver | Pittsburgh Steelers | 1974–1987 |
| Dick Stanfel^{[3]} | 2016 | Guard | Detroit Lions | 1952–1955 |
| Dick Stanfel^{[3]} | 2016 | Guard | Washington Redskins | 1956–1958 |
| Bart Starr** | 1977 | Quarterback | Green Bay Packers | 1956–1971 |
| Roger Staubach**^{[4]} | 1985 | Quarterback | Dallas Cowboys | 1969–1979 |
| Ernie Stautner | 1969 | Defensive tackle | Pittsburgh Steelers | 1950–1963 |
| Jan Stenerud** | 1991 | Placekicker | Kansas City Chiefs | 1967–1979 |
| Jan Stenerud** | 1991 | Placekicker | Green Bay Packers | 1980–1983 |
| Jan Stenerud** | 1991 | Placekicker | Minnesota Vikings | 1984–1985 |
| Dwight Stephenson | 1998 | Center | Miami Dolphins | 1980–1987 |
| Michael Strahan | 2014 | Defensive end | New York Giants | 1993–2007 |
| Hank Stram ^^{[3]} | 2003 | Coach | Dallas Texans (AFL)/ Kansas City Chiefs | 1960–1974 |
| Hank Stram ^^{[3]} | 2003 | Coach | New Orleans Saints | 1976–1977 |
| Ken Strong | 1967 | Halfback/placekicker Pre-Modern Era: Two-Way Performer | Staten Island Stapletons | 1929–1932 |
| Ken Strong | 1967 | Halfback/placekicker Pre-Modern Era: Two-Way Performer | New York Giants | 1933–1935, 1939 |
| Ken Strong | 1967 | Placekicker | New York Giants | 1944–1947 |
| Ken Strong | 1967 | Halfback Pre-Modern Era: Two-Way Performer | New York Yankees (AFL II) | 1936–1937 |
| Joe Stydahar | 1967 | Tackle Pre-Modern Era: Two-Way Performer | Chicago Bears | 1936–1942, 1945–1946 |
| Joe Stydahar | 1967 | Coach | Los Angeles Rams | 1950–1952 |
| Joe Stydahar | 1967 | Coach | Chicago Cardinals | 1953–1954 |
| Lynn Swann | 2001 | Wide receiver | Pittsburgh Steelers | 1974–1982 |
| Paul Tagliabue † | 2020 | NFL commissioner | n/a | 1989–2006 |
| Fran Tarkenton | 1986 | Quarterback | Minnesota Vikings | 1961–1966, 1972–1978 |
| Fran Tarkenton | 1986 | Quarterback | New York Giants | 1967–1971 |
| Charley Taylor | 1984 | Wide receiver | Washington Redskins | 1964–1975, 1977 |
| Jason Taylor** | 2017 | Defensive End | Miami Dolphins | 1997–2007, 2009, 2011 |
| Jason Taylor** | 2017 | Defensive End | Washington Redskins | 2008 |
| Jason Taylor** | 2017 | Defensive End | New York Jets | 2010 |
| Jim Taylor | 1976 | Fullback | Green Bay Packers | 1958–1966 |
| Jim Taylor | 1976 | Fullback | New Orleans Saints | 1967 |
| Lawrence Taylor** | 1999 | Linebacker | New York Giants | 1981–1993 |
| Derrick Thomas | 2009 | Linebacker | Kansas City Chiefs | 1989–1999 |
| Emmitt Thomas ^^{[3]} | 2008 | Cornerback | Kansas City Chiefs | 1966–1978 |
| Joe Thomas** | 2023 | Offensive tackle | Cleveland Browns | 2007–2017 |
| Thurman Thomas | 2007 | Running back | Buffalo Bills | 1988–1999 |
| Thurman Thomas | 2007 | Running back | Miami Dolphins | 2000 |
| Zach Thomas | 2023 | Linebacker | Miami Dolphins | 1996–2007 |
| Zach Thomas | 2023 | Linebacker | Dallas Cowboys | 2008 |
| Jim Thorpe § | 1963 | Halfback/coach Pre-Modern Era: Two-Way Performer | Canton Bulldogs (pre-NFL) | 1915–17, 1919 |
| Jim Thorpe § | 1963 | 1st NFL president | n/a | 1920 |
| Jim Thorpe § | 1963 | Coach/halfback Pre-Modern Era: Two-Way Performer | Canton Bulldogs | 1920 |
| Jim Thorpe § | 1963 | Coach/halfback Pre-Modern Era: Two-Way Performer | Cleveland Indians | 1921 |
| Jim Thorpe § | 1963 | Coach/halfback Pre-Modern Era: Two-Way Performer | Oorang Indians | 1922–1923 |
| Jim Thorpe § | 1963 | Halfback Pre-Modern Era: Two-Way Performer | Rock Island Independents | 1924–1925 |
| Jim Thorpe § | 1963 | Halfback Pre-Modern Era: Two-Way Performer | New York Giants | 1925 |
| Jim Thorpe § | 1963 | Halfback Pre-Modern Era: Two-Way Performer | Canton Bulldogs | 1926 |
| Jim Thorpe § | 1963 | Halfback Pre-Modern Era: Two-Way Performer | Chicago Cardinals | 1928 |
| Mick Tingelhoff^{[3]} | 2015 | Center | Minnesota Vikings | 1962–1978 |
| Andre Tippett | 2008 | Linebacker | New England Patriots | 1982–1993 |
| Y. A. Tittle | 1971 | Quarterback | Baltimore Colts (AAFC/ NFL) (1947–50 Colts folded) | 1948–1950 |
| Y. A. Tittle | 1971 | Quarterback | San Francisco 49ers | 1951–1960 |
| Y. A. Tittle | 1971 | Quarterback | New York Giants | 1961–1964 |
| LaDainian Tomlinson** | 2017 | Running back | San Diego Chargers | 2001–2009 |
| LaDainian Tomlinson** | 2017 | Running back | New York Jets | 2010–2011 |
| George Trafton | 1964 | Center Pre-Modern Era: Two-Way Performer | Decatur Staleys/ Chicago Staleys/ Chicago Bears | 1920–1932 |
| Charley Trippi | 1968 | Halfback | Chicago Cardinals | 1947–1955 |
| Emlen Tunnell | 1967 | Safety | New York Giants | 1948–1958 |
| Emlen Tunnell | 1967 | Safety | Green Bay Packers | 1959–1961 |
| Bulldog Turner | 1966 | Center Pre-Modern Era: Two-Way Performer | Chicago Bears | 1940–1952 |
| Johnny Unitas** | 1979 | Quarterback | Baltimore Colts | 1956–1972 |
| Johnny Unitas** | 1979 | Quarterback | San Diego Chargers | 1973 |
| Gene Upshaw** | 1987 | Guard | Oakland Raiders | 1967–1981 |
| Brian Urlacher** | 2018 | Linebacker | Chicago Bears | 2000–2012 |
| Norm Van Brocklin | 1971 | Quarterback | Los Angeles Rams | 1949–1957 |
| Norm Van Brocklin | 1971 | Quarterback | Philadelphia Eagles | 1958–1960 |
| Steve Van Buren | 1965 | Halfback Pre-Modern Era: Two-Way Performer | Philadelphia Eagles | 1944–1951 |
| Dick Vermeil | 2022 | Coach | Philadelphia Eagles | 1976–1982 |
| Dick Vermeil | 2022 | Coach | St. Louis Rams | 1997–1999 |
| Dick Vermeil | 2022 | Coach | Kansas City Chiefs | 2001–2005 |
| Adam Vinatieri | 2026 | Placekicker | New England Patriots | 1996–2005 |
| Adam Vinatieri | 2026 | Placekicker | Indianapolis Colts | 2006–2019 |
| Doak Walker^{[3]}^{[4]} | 1986 | Halfback/placekicker | Detroit Lions | 1950–1955 |
| Bill Walsh | 1993 | Coach | San Francisco 49ers | 1979–1988 |
| DeMarcus Ware | 2023 | Linebacker/defensive end | Dallas Cowboys | 2005–2013 |
| DeMarcus Ware | 2023 | Linebacker/defensive end | Denver Broncos | 2014–2016 |
| Paul Warfield** | 1983 | Wide receiver | Cleveland Browns | 1964–1969, 1976–1977 |
| Paul Warfield** | 1983 | Wide receiver | Miami Dolphins | 1970–1974 |
| Kurt Warner | 2017 | Quarterback | St. Louis Rams | 1998–2003 |
| Kurt Warner | 2017 | Quarterback | New York Giants | 2004 |
| Kurt Warner | 2017 | Quarterback | Arizona Cardinals | 2005–2009 |
| Bob Waterfield | 1965 | Quarterback | Cleveland/ Los Angeles Rams | 1945–1952 |
| Mike Webster | 1997 | Center | Pittsburgh Steelers | 1974–1988 |
| Mike Webster | 1997 | Center | Kansas City Chiefs | 1989–1990 |
| Roger Wehrli | 2007 | Cornerback | St. Louis Cardinals | 1969–1982 |
| Arnie Weinmeister ^^{[3]} | 1984 | Defensive tackle | New York Yankees (AAFC) | 1948–1949 |
| Arnie Weinmeister ^^{[3]} | 1984 | Defensive tackle | New York Giants | 1950–1953 |
| Randy White** | 1994 | Defensive tackle | Dallas Cowboys | 1975–1988 |
| Reggie White** | 2006 | Defensive end/tackle | Philadelphia Eagles | 1985–1992 |
| Reggie White** | 2006 | Defensive end/tackle | Green Bay Packers | 1993–1998 |
| Reggie White** | 2006 | Defensive end/tackle | Carolina Panthers | 2000 |
| Dave Wilcox ^^{[3]} | 2000 | Linebacker | San Francisco 49ers | 1964–1974 |
| Aeneas Williams | 2014 | Cornerback | Phoenix /Arizona Cardinals | 1991–2000 |
| Aeneas Williams | 2014 | Cornerback | St. Louis Rams | 2001–2002 |
| Aeneas Williams | 2014 | Safety | St. Louis Rams | 2003–2004 |
| Bill Willis ^^{[3]} | 1977 | Defensive middle guard | Cleveland Browns (AAFC/ NFL) | 1946–1953 |
| Patrick Willis | 2024 | Linebacker | San Francisco 49ers | 2007–2014 |
| Larry Wilson** | 1978 | Safety | St. Louis Cardinals | 1960–1972 |
| Ralph C. Wilson | 2009 | AFL co-founder | n/a | 1959 |
| Ralph C. Wilson | 2009 | Team owner/founder | Buffalo Bills (AFL/ NFL) | 1959–2014 |
| Kellen Winslow | 1995 | Tight end | San Diego Chargers | 1979–1987 |
| Alex Wojciechowicz | 1968 | Center/linebacker Pre-Modern Era: Two-Way Performer | Detroit Lions | 1938–1946 |
| Alex Wojciechowicz | 1968 | Center/linebacker Pre-Modern Era: Two-Way Performer | Philadelphia Eagles | 1946–1950 |
| Ron Wolf | 2015 | General manager | Tampa Bay Buccaneers | 1976–1978 |
| Ron Wolf | 2015 | General manager | Green Bay Packers | 1991–2001 |
| Willie Wood | 1989 | Safety | Green Bay Packers | 1960–1971 |
| Charles Woodson** ^{[4]} | 2021 | Cornerback/safety | Oakland Raiders | 1998–2005, 2013–2015 |
| Charles Woodson** ^{[4]} | 2021 | Cornerback/safety | Green Bay Packers | 2006–2012 |
| Rod Woodson** | 2009 | Cornerback/safety/kick returner | Pittsburgh Steelers | 1987–1996 |
| Rod Woodson** | 2009 | Cornerback/safety/kick returner | San Francisco 49ers | 1997 |
| Rod Woodson** | 2009 | Cornerback/safety/kick returner | Baltimore Ravens | 1998–2001 |
| Rod Woodson** | 2009 | Cornerback/safety/kick returner | Oakland Raiders | 2002–2003 |
| Rayfield Wright^{[3]} | 2006 | Offensive tackle | Dallas Cowboys | 1967–1979 |
| Ron Yary | 2001 | Offensive tackle | Minnesota Vikings | 1968–1981 |
| Ron Yary | 2001 | Offensive tackle | Los Angeles Rams | 1982 |
| Bryant Young | 2022 | Defensive end/tackle | San Francisco 49ers | 1994–2007 |
| George Young † | 2020 | Director of player personnel | Miami Dolphins | 1975–1978 |
| George Young † | 2020 | General manager | New York Giants | 1979–1997 |
| George Young † | 2020 | Senior vice president of football operations | n/a | 1998–2001 |
| Steve Young** | 2005 | Quarterback | Tampa Bay Buccaneers | 1985–1986 |
| Steve Young** | 2005 | Quarterback | San Francisco 49ers | 1987–1999 |
| Jack Youngblood | 2001 | Defensive end | Los Angeles Rams | 1971–1984 |
| Gary Zimmerman | 2008 | Offensive tackle | Minnesota Vikings | 1986–1992 |
| Gary Zimmerman | 2008 | Offensive tackle | Denver Broncos | 1993–1997 |

Notes:

^{1} Selected in first year of eligibility
^{2} Charter member
^{3} Senior nominee
^{4} Heisman Trophy Winner
^{5} As head coach of the Akron Pros in 1921, Fritz Pollard became the first African American coach in NFL history.

== Inductees who have played for non-NFL teams ==
Through 2026, Billy Shaw is the only player in the Hall of Fame who has never played in the NFL; he played the entirety of his career with the Buffalo Bills in the AFL. While the hall recognizes NFL teams which had previously been in the AFL, AAFC, or been independent/Ohio League, other professional football leagues' franchises are not considered primary teams to the individuals who have contributed to them. Here is a list of individuals who have contributed to other professional leagues at some point in their career. As of 2026, four players have contributed to AFL I, one to AFL II, one to AFL III, three to the American Association, three to the Arena Football League, one to the Indoor Football League, eleven to the Canadian Football League, four to the World Football League, five to the United States Football League, two to the Continental Football League, two for NFL Europe, one for the 1960s United Football League, one for Western Pennsylvania Professional Football Circuit, and eleven played for independent teams (several of which played in the NFL at some point). The Ohio League had five individuals contribute, the All-America Football Conference had fifteen, and the American Football League which merged with the NFL had thirty-nine Hall of Famers play for the league. Bill Polian founded the Alliance of American Football, but he was inducted into the hall in 2015 and the league started in 2019. As previously stated, for CFL stars, there is a corresponding Canadian Football Hall of Fame; only one player, Warren Moon, and two coaches, Bud Grant and Marv Levy, are enshrined in both halls. Again for the Arena Football League, there is also a corresponding Arena Football Hall of Fame; similarly, one player, Kurt Warner, has been enshrined into both halls. The Indoor Football League has also established a Hall of Fame, of which Terrell Owens played one season, thus no players have been inducted into both halls. Owens has also played in the Fan Controlled Football since 2022, five years after his enshrinement into the Hall.

(This list only includes contributors in the same field for which they were inducted; thus, though Doak Walker and Steve Van Buren were inducted to the Hall of Fame as players, their coaching work in the Continental Football League is not counted here.)

| Inductee | Class | Position | League(s) | Team(s) | Years |
|---|---|---|---|---|---|
| Harold "Red" Grange | 1963 | Halfback Pre-Modern Era: Two-Way Performer | AFL I | New York Yankees* | 1926 |
| Earl "Curly" Lambeau | 1963 | Founder | Independent | Green Bay Packers* | 1919 |
| Earl "Curly" Lambeau | 1963 | Halfback | Independent | Green Bay Packers* | 1919–1920 |
| Earl "Curly" Lambeau | 1963 | Coach | Independent | Green Bay Packers* | 1919–1920 |
| Earl "Curly" Lambeau | 1963 | General manager | Independent | Green Bay Packers* | 1919–1920 |
| Ray Flaherty | 1976 | End Pre-Modern Era: Two-Way Performer | AFL I | Los Angeles Wildcats | 1926 |
| Mike Michalske | 1964 | Guard Pre-Modern Era: Two-Way Performer | AFL I | New York Yankees* | 1926 |
| Art Rooney | 1964 | Owner/general manager/coach | Western Pennsylvania Professional Football Circuit | Hope-Harvey/ Majestic Radios/ J.P. Rooneys* (precursor to the Pittsburgh Steelers) | 1921–1932 |
| Ken Strong | 1967 | Halfback Pre-Modern Era: Two-Way Performer | AFL II | New York Yankees | 1936–1937 |
| Ken Strong | 1967 | Halfback Pre-Modern Era: Two-Way Performer | American Association | Jersey City Giants | 1938, 1940 |
| Ken Strong | 1967 | Coach | American Association | Jersey City Giants | 1938 |
| Paul Brown | 1967 | Coach/general manager | All-America Football Conference | Cleveland Browns* | 1946–1949 |
| Sid Luckman | 1965 | Quarterback Pre-Modern Era: Two-Way Performer | American Association | Newark Bears (Note: As a Chicago Bears player. Was sent to their minor-league affiliate for one game.) | 1939 |
| George Halas | 1963 | End Pre-Modern Era: Two-Way Performer | Independent | Hammond All-Stars* | 1919 |
| George Halas | 1963 | End Pre-Modern Era: Two-Way Performer | Independent | Chicago Stayms | 1920 |
| Johnny Blood | 1963 | Halfback Pre-Modern Era: Two-Way Performer | AFL III | Buffalo Indians | 1941 |
| Jim Thorpe | 1963 | Halfback/coach Pre-Modern Era: Two-Way Performer | Ohio League (Pre-NFL) | Canton Bulldogs* | 1915–17, 1919 |
| Jim Thorpe | 1963 | Halfback/coach Pre-Modern Era: Two-Way Performer | Independent | Tampa Cardinals | 1926 |
| Joseph Carr | 1963 | Coach | Independent | Columbus Panhandles* | 1901–1903 |
| Joseph Carr | 1963 | Coach | Ohio League (Pre-NFL) | Columbus Panhandles* | 1904, 1907–1918 |
| Joseph Carr | 1963 | Team owner/general manager | Ohio League (Pre-NFL) | Columbus Panhandles* | 1904, 1907–1919 |
| Jimmy Conzelman | 1964 | Coach | Independent | St. Louis Gunners* | 1931 |
| Guy Chamberlin | 1965 | End Pre-Modern Era: Two-Way Performer | Ohio League (Pre-NFL) | Canton Bulldogs* | 1919 |
| John "Paddy" Driscoll | 1965 | Quarterback | Independent | Hammond All-Stars/ Pros* | 1917, 1919 |
| Otto Graham | 1965 | Quarterback | All-America Football Conference | Cleveland Browns* | 1946–1949 |
| Joe Guyon | 1966 | Halfback Pre-Modern Era: Two-Way Performer | Ohio League (Pre-NFL) | Canton Bulldogs* | 1919 |
| Joe Guyon | 1966 | Halfback Pre-Modern Era: Two-Way Performer | Independent | Union Quakers of Philadelphia | 1921 |
| Steve Owen | 1966 | Tackle Pre-Modern Era: Two-Way Performer | Independent | Hartford Blues* | 1925 |
| Steve Owen | 1966 | Coach | Canadian Football League | Toronto Argonauts | 1959 |
| Steve Owen | 1966 | Coach | Canadian Football League | Calgary Stampeders | 1960 |
| Steve Owen | 1966 | Coach | Canadian Football League | Saskatchewan Roughriders | 1961–1962 |
| Steve Owen | 1966 | Coach | United Football League | Syracuse Stormers | 1963 |
| Elroy (Crazylegs) Hirsch | 1968 | Halfback | All-America Football Conference | Chicago Rockets | 1946–1948 |
| Marion Motley | 1968 | Fullback | All-America Football Conference | Cleveland Browns | 1946–1949 |
| Greasy Neale | 1969 | Coach | Ohio League (Pre-NFL) | Dayton Triangles* | 1918 |
| Greasy Neale | 1969 | Coach | Independent | Ironton Tanks | 1930 |
| Joe Perry | 1969 | Fullback | All-America Football Conference | San Francisco 49ers* | 1948–1949 |
| Frank "Bruiser" Kinard | 1971 | Tackle Pre-Modern Era: Two-Way Performer | Independent/Military program | Fleet City Blue Jackets | 1945 |
| Frank "Bruiser" Kinard | 1971 | Tackle Pre-Modern Era: Two-Way Performer | All-America Football Conference | New York Yankees | 1946–1947 |
| Vince Lombardi | 1971 | Guard | Independent | Wilmington Clippers | 1937 |
| Vince Lombardi | 1971 | Guard | American Association | Brooklyn Eagles | 1938 |
| Lamar Hunt | 1972 | AFL co-founder | AFL (Pre-merger) | n/a | 1959 |
| Lamar Hunt | 1972 | Team owner | AFL (Pre-merger) | Dallas Texans/ Kansas City Chiefs* | 1959–1969 |
| Ace Parker | 1972 | Quarterback Pre-Modern Era: Two-Way Performer | All-America Football Conference | New York Yankees | 1946 |
| Lou Groza | 1974 | Offensive tackle/kicker | All-America Football Conference | Cleveland Browns* | 1946–1949 |
| Dante Lavelli | 1975 | Offensive end | All-America Football Conference | Cleveland Browns* | 1946–1949 |
| Len Ford | 1976 | Defensive end | All-America Football Conference | Los Angeles Dons | 1948–1949 |
| Bill Willis | 1977 | Defensive middle guard | All-America Football Conference | Cleveland Browns* | 1946–1949 |
| Lance Alworth | 1978 | Flanker | AFL (Pre-merger) | San Diego Chargers* | 1962–1969 |
| Weeb Ewbank | 1978 | Coach | AFL (Pre-merger) | New York Jets* | 1963–1969 |
| Ron Mix | 1979 | Offensive tackle | AFL (Pre-merger) | Los Angeles/ San Diego Chargers* | 1960–1969 |
| Jim Otto | 1980 | Center | AFL (Pre-merger) | Oakland Raiders* | 1960–1969 |
| George Blanda | 1981 | Quarterback/placekicker | AFL (Pre-merger) | Houston Oilers* | 1960–1966 |
| George Blanda | 1981 | Quarterback/placekicker | AFL (Pre-merger) | Oakland Raiders | 1967–1969 |
| Bobby Bell | 1983 | Linebacker/defensive end | AFL (Pre-merger) | Kansas City Chiefs* | 1963–1969 |
| Sid Gillman | 1983 | Coach/general manager | AFL (Pre-merger) | Los Angeles/ San Diego Chargers* | 1960–1969 |
| Paul Warfield | 1983 | Wide receiver | World Football League | Memphis Southmen | 1975 |
| Willie Brown | 1984 | Cornerback | AFL (Pre-merger) | Denver Broncos* | 1963–1966 |
| Willie Brown | 1984 | Cornerback | AFL (Pre-merger) | Oakland Raiders* | 1967–1969 |
| Arnie Weinmeister | 1984 | Defensive tackle | All-America Football Conference | New York Yankees/ Brooklyn-New York Yankees | 1948–1949 |
| Arnie Weinmeister | 1984 | Defensive tackle | Canadian Football League | BC Lions | 1954–1955 |
| Frank Gatski | 1985 | Center | All-America Football Conference | Cleveland Browns* | 1946–1956 |
| Joe Namath | 1985 | Quarterback | AFL (Pre-merger) | New York Jets* | 1965–1969 |
| O. J. Simpson | 1985 | Running back | AFL (Pre-merger) | Buffalo Bills* | 1969 |
| Ken Houston | 1986 | Safety | AFL (Pre-merger) | Houston Oilers* | 1967–1969 |
| Willie Lanier | 1986 | Middle linebacker | AFL (Pre-merger) | Kansas City Chiefs* | 1967–1969 |
| Larry Csonka | 1987 | Fullback | AFL (Pre-merger) | Miami Dolphins* | 1968–1969 |
| Larry Csonka | 1987 | Fullback | World Football League | Memphis Southmen | 1975 |
| Len Dawson | 1987 | Quarterback | AFL (Pre-merger) | Dallas Texans/ Kansas City Chiefs* | 1962–1969 |
| John Henry Johnson | 1987 | Fullback | Canadian Football League | Calgary Stampeders | 1953 |
| John Henry Johnson | 1987 | Fullback | AFL (Pre-merger) | Houston Oilers* | 1966 |
| Don Maynard | 1987 | Wide receiver | Canadian Football League | Hamilton Tiger-Cats | 1959 |
| Don Maynard | 1987 | Wide receiver | AFL (Pre-merger) | New York Titans/ Jets* | 1960–1969 |
| Don Maynard | 1987 | Wide receiver | World Football League | Houston Texans/ Shreveport Steamer | 1974 |
| Gene Upshaw | 1987 | Guard | AFL (Pre-merger) | Oakland Raiders* | 1967–1969 |
| Fred Biletnikoff | 1988 | Wide receiver | AFL (Pre-merger) | Oakland Raiders* | 1965–1969 |
| Fred Biletnikoff | 1988 | Wide receiver | Canadian Football League | Montreal Alouettes | 1980 |
| Art Shell | 1989 | Offensive tackle | AFL (Pre-merger) | Oakland Raiders* | 1968–1969 |
| Buck Buchanan | 1990 | Defensive tackle | AFL (Pre-merger) | Kansas City Chiefs* | 1963–1969 |
| Bob Griese | 1990 | Quarterback | AFL (Pre-merger) | Miami Dolphins* | 1967–1969 |
| Jan Stenerud | 1991 | Placekicker | AFL (Pre-merger) | Kansas City Chiefs* | 1967–1969 |
| Al Davis | 1992 | Coach | AFL (Pre-merger) | Oakland Raiders* | 1963–1965 |
| Al Davis | 1992 | General manager | AFL (Pre-merger) | Oakland Raiders* | 1963–1969 |
| Al Davis | 1992 | Team owner | AFL (Pre-merger) | Oakland Raiders* | 1966–1969 |
| Al Davis | 1992 | AFL commissioner | AFL (Pre-merger) | n/a | 1966 |
| Bill Walsh | 1993 | Coach | Continental Football League | San Jose Apaches | 1967 |
| Larry Little | 1993 | Guard | AFL (Pre-merger) | San Diego Chargers* | 1967–1968 |
| Larry Little | 1993 | Guard | AFL (Pre-merger) | Miami Dolphins* | 1969 |
| Bud Grant | 1994 | Coach | Canadian Football League | Winnipeg Blue Bombers | 1957–1966 |
| Leroy Kelly | 1994 | Running back | World Football League | Chicago Fire | 1974 |
| Jim Finks | 1995 | Team administrator | Canadian Football League | Calgary Stampeders | 1957–1964 |
| Charlie Joiner | 1996 | Wide receiver | AFL (Pre-merger) | Houston Oilers* | 1969 |
| Billy Shaw | 1999 | Guard | AFL (Pre-merger) | Buffalo Bills* | 1961–1969 |
| Nick Buoniconti | 2001 | Linebacker | AFL (Pre-merger) | Boston Patriots* | 1962–1968 |
| Nick Buoniconti | 2001 | Linebacker | AFL (Pre-merger) | Miami Dolphins* | 1969 |
| Marv Levy | 2001 | Coach | Canadian Football League | Montreal Alouettes | 1973–1977 |
| Marv Levy | 2001 | Coach | United States Football League | Chicago Blitz | 1984 |
| George Allen | 2002 | Coach | United States Football League | Chicago Blitz | 1983 |
| George Allen | 2002 | Coach | United States Football League | Arizona Wranglers | 1984 |
| Jim Kelly | 2002 | Quarterback | United States Football League | Houston Gamblers | 1984–1985 |
| Elvin Bethea | 2003 | Defensive end | AFL (Pre-merger) | Houston Oilers* | 1968–1969 |
| Joe DeLamielleure | 2003 | Guard | Arena Football League | Charlotte Rage | 1992 |
| Hank Stram | 2003 | Coach | AFL (Pre-merger) | Dallas Texans/ Kansas City Chiefs* | 1960–1969 |
| Fritz Pollard | 2005 | Halfback Pre-Modern Era: Two-Way Performer | Independent | Union Club of Phoenixville | 1920 |
| Fritz Pollard | 2005 | Halfback Pre-Modern Era: Two-Way Performer | Independent | Gilberton Catamounts | 1924 |
| Fritz Pollard | 2005 | Halfback Pre-Modern Era: Two-Way Performer | Anthracite League | Gilberton Catamounts | 1925 |
| Fritz Pollard | 2005 | Coach | Independent | Chicago Black Hawks | 1928 |
| Steve Young | 2005 | Quarterback | United States Football League | Los Angeles Express | 1984–1985 |
| John Madden | 2006 | Coach | AFL (Pre-merger) | Oakland Raiders* | 1969 |
| Warren Moon | 2006 | Quarterback | Canadian Football League | Edmonton Eskimos | 1978–1983 |
| Reggie White | 2006 | Defensive end | United States Football League | Memphis Showboats | 1984–1985 |
| Emmitt Thomas | 2008 | Cornerback | AFL (Pre-merger) | Kansas City Chiefs* | 1966–1969 |
| Gary Zimmerman | 2008 | Offensive tackle | United States Football League | Los Angeles Express | 1984–1985 |
| Ralph C. Wilson | 2009 | AFL co-founder | AFL (Pre-merger) | n/a | 1959 |
| Ralph C. Wilson | 2009 | Team owner/founder | AFL (Pre-merger) | Buffalo Bills* | 1959–1969 |
| Curley Culp | 2013 | Defensive tackle | AFL (Pre-merger) | Kansas City Chiefs* | 1968–1969 |
| Ron Wolf | 2015 | Personnel administrator | AFL (Pre-merger) | Oakland Raiders* | 1963–1969 |
| Ken Stabler | 2016 | Quarterback | Continental Football League | Spokane Shockers | 1968 |
| Ken Stabler | 2016 | Quarterback | AFL (Pre-merger) | Oakland Raiders* | 1968–1969 |
| Kurt Warner | 2017 | Quarterback | Arena Football League | Iowa Barnstormers | 1995–1997 |
| Kurt Warner | 2017 | Quarterback | NFL Europe | Amsterdam Admirals | 1998 |
| Bobby Beathard | 2018 | Personnel administrator | AFL (Pre-merger) | Kansas City Chiefs* | 1963, 1966–1967 |
| Terrell Owens | 2018 | Wide receiver | Indoor Football League | Allen Wranglers | 2012 |
| Terrell Owens | 2018 | Wide receiver | Fan Controlled Football | FCF Zappers | 2022 |
| Terrell Owens | 2018 | Wide receiver | Fan Controlled Football | Knights of Degen | 2022–present |
| Pat Bowlen | 2019 | Team owner | Arena Football League | Colorado Crush | 2003–2008 |
| Johnny Robinson | 2019 | Safety | AFL (Pre-merger) | Dallas Texans/ Kansas City Chiefs* | 1960–1969 |
| Bill Polian | 2015 | Personnel administrator | Canadian Football League | Montreal Alouettes | |
| Bill Polian | 2015 | Personnel administrator | Canadian Football League | Winnipeg Blue Bombers | |
| Bill Polian | 2015 | Personnel administrator | United States Football League | Chicago Blitz | 1984 |
| Bill Polian | 2015 | Founder | Alliance of American Football | n/a | 2019 |
| Winston Hill | 2020 | Offensive tackle | AFL (Pre-merger) | New York Jets* | 1963–1969 |
| Duke Slater | 2020 | Tackle Pre-Modern Era: Two-Way Performer | AFL I | Rock Island Independents* | 1926 |
| Mac Speedie | 2020 | End | All-America Football Conference | Cleveland Browns* | 1946–1949 |
| Mac Speedie | 2020 | End | Canadian Football League | Saskatchewan Roughriders | 1953–1954 |
| Mac Speedie | 2020 | End | Canadian Football League | BC Lions | 1955 |
| Art McNally | 2022 | Supervisor of officiating | World League | n/a | 1991–1995 |
| Sam Mills | 2022 | Linebacker | United States Football League | Philadelphia / Baltimore Stars | 1983–1985 |
| Adam Vinatieri | 2026 | Placekicker | NFL Europe | Amsterdam Admirals | 1996 |

"*" indicates that a team had at one point in their existence participated in the NFL.

The following are current and defunct professional football leagues which as of 2020 have had no Pro Football Hall of Fame Inductees play for:

- New York Pro Football League—Leo Lyons has been nominated several times but never inducted
- XFL, nor its short lived predecessor
- Liga de Fútbol Americano Profesional
- United Football League (2009–2012)
- Alliance of American Football (Although the league was founded by Bill Polian, he was inducted in 2015 and the league only lasted in 2019)
- Legends Football League
- American Arena League
- American West Football Conference
- Champions Indoor Football
- National Arena League
