= Green Bay Packers draft picks (1936–1969) =

The Green Bay Packers are a professional American football team based in Green Bay, Wisconsin. The Packers have competed in the National Football League (NFL) since 1921, two years after their original founding by Curly Lambeau and George Whitney Calhoun. They are members of the North Division of the National Football Conference (NFC) and play their home games at Lambeau Field in central Wisconsin.

The NFL draft, officially known as the "NFL Annual Player Selection Meeting", is an annual event which serves as the league's most common source of player recruitment. The draft order is determined based on the previous season's standings; the teams with the worst win–loss records receive the earliest picks. Teams that qualified for the NFL playoffs select after non-qualifiers, and their order depends on how far they advanced, using their regular season record as a tie-breaker. The final two selections in the first round are reserved for the Super Bowl runner-up and champion. Draft picks are tradable and players or other picks can be acquired with them.

In 1936, the Packers took part in the first NFL draft of college football players. With the seventh pick of the first round of that draft, Russ Letlow, a guard out of the University of San Francisco, became the Packers' first draft selection. In addition to the annual draft, the Packers took part in the 1950 All-America Football Conference (AAFC) dispersal draft. This draft was organized after the AAFC, which was formed as a competing league in 1946, merged with the NFL. Three teams from the AAFC were admitted into the NFL, while the remaining players from the five defunct teams became automatically eligible for selection by an existing NFL team in the dispersal draft. Twelve of the players drafted by the Packers between 1936 and 1969 have been inducted into the Pro Football Hall of Fame. Eleven of these players, along with 33 other Packers draftees, have been inducted into the Green Bay Packers Hall of Fame. The Packers took part in every draft from 1936 to 1969, prior to the AFL–NFL merger and the formation of the modern draft in 1970.

== Key ==
Key
^{#}	Inducted into the Green Bay Packers Hall of Fame
†	Inducted into the Pro Football Hall of Fame
‡	Inducted into the Green Bay Packers Hall of Fame and Pro Football Hall of Fame

== 1936 draft ==
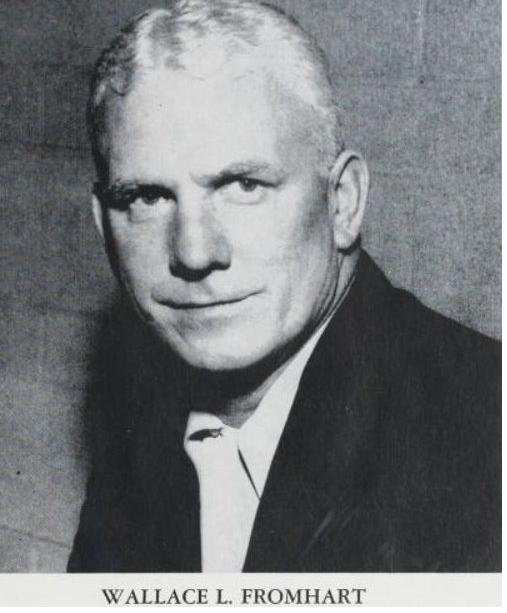
Wally Fromhart, shown here in 1954, was the Packers' seventh-round selection in the 1936 draft.

Green Bay Packers draft selections in 1936Source: Pro-Football-Reference.com
Round	Pick #	Overall	Name	Position (Note: Position reflects the source for each table (Pro-Football-Reference.com) and may not be representative of a player's college position or a modern equivalent position.)	College
1	7	7	Russ Letlow ^{#}	Guard	San Francisco
2	7	16	J. W. Wheeler	Tackle	Oklahoma
3	7	25	Bernie Scherer	End	Nebraska
4	7	34	Theron Ward	Back	Idaho
5	7	43	Darrell Lester	Center	TCU
6	7	52	Bob Reynolds	Tackle	Stanford
7	7	61	Wally Fromhart	Back	Notre Dame
8	7	70	Wally Cruice	Back	Northwestern
9	7	79	J. C. Wetsel	Guard	SMU

== 1937 draft ==
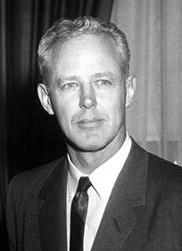
Bud Wilkinson, shown here in 1961, was the Packers' third-round selection in the 1937 draft.

Green Bay Packers draft selections in 1937Source: Pro-Football-Reference.com
Round	Pick #	Overall	Name	Position	College
1	9	9	Eddie Jankowski ^{#}	Fullback	Wisconsin
2	9	19	Ave Daniell	Tackle	Pittsburgh
3	9	29	Bud Wilkinson	Tacke	Minnesota
4	9	39	Bud Svendsen ^{#}	Center	Minnesota
5	9	49	Dewitt Gibson	Tackle	Northwestern
6	9	59	Merle Wendt	End	Ohio St.
7	9	69	Marv Baldwin	Tackle	TCU
8	9	79	Les Chapman	Tackle	Tulsa
9	9	89	Gordon Dahlgren	Guard	Michigan St.
10	9	99	Dave Gavin	Tackle	Holy Cross

== 1938 draft ==
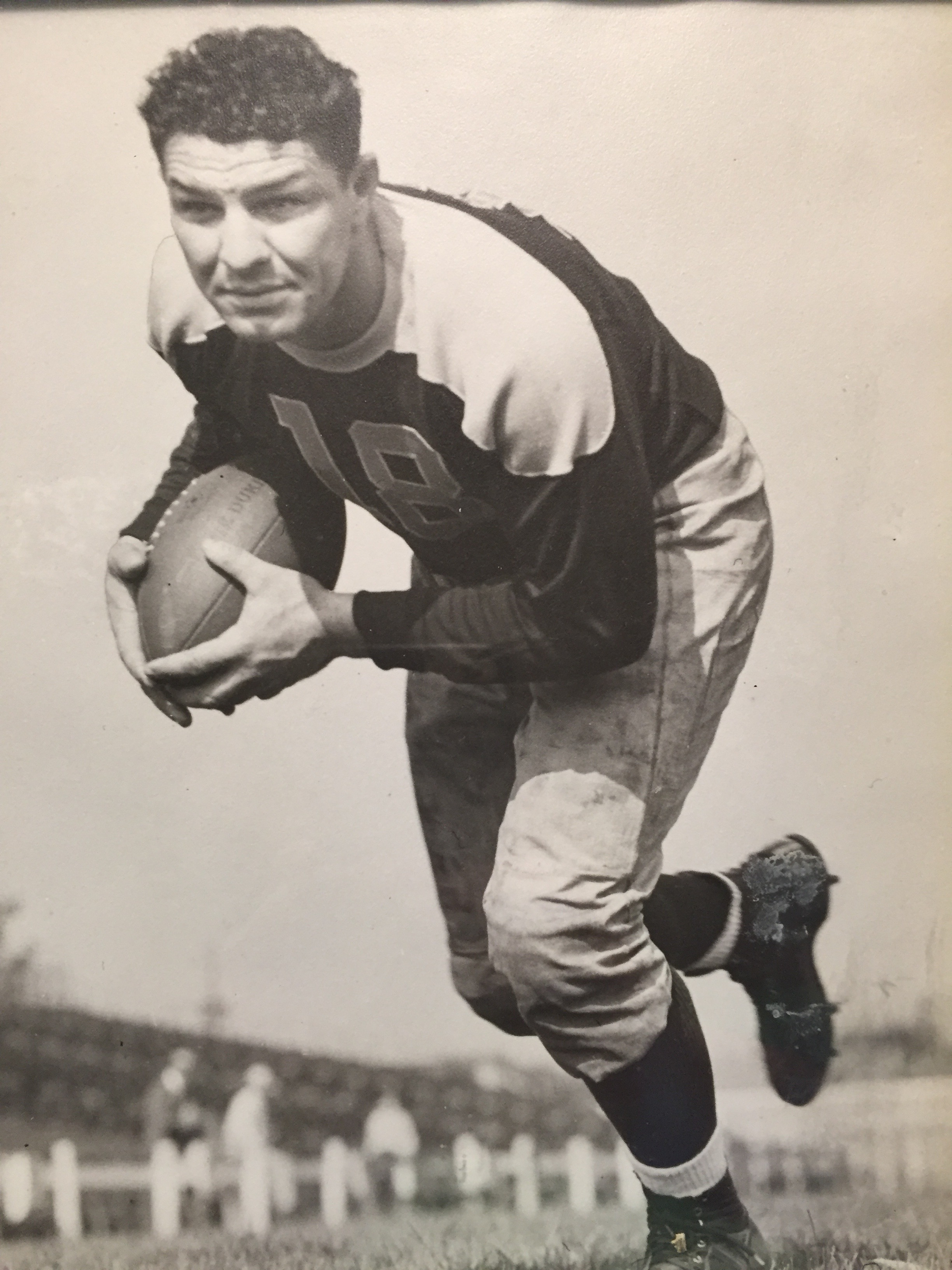
Tony Falkenstein was the Packers' twelfth round selection in the 1938 draft.

Green Bay Packers draft selections in 1938Source: Pro-Football-Reference.com
Round	Pick #	Overall	Name	Position	College
1	7	7	Cecil Isbell ^{#}	Tailback	Purdue
3	7	22	Marty Schreyer	Tackle	Purdue
5	7	37	Chuck Sweeney	End	Notre Dame
6	7	47	Andy Uram ^{#}	Running back	Minnesota
7	7	57	Johnny Kovatch	End	Northwestern
8	7	67	Phil Ragazzo	Tackle	Case Western Reserve
9	7	77	John Howell	Halfback	Nebraska
10	7	87	Frank Barnhart	Guard	Northern Colorado
11	7	97	Pete Tinsley ^{#}	Guard	Georgia
12	7	107	Tony Falkenstein	Fullback	Saint Mary's (CA)

== 1939 draft ==
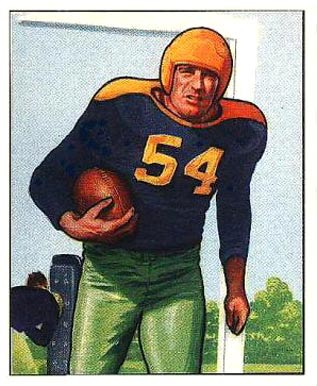
Larry Craig was the Packers' sixth-round selection in the 1939 draft.

Green Bay Packers draft selections in 1939Source: Pro-Football-Reference.com
Round	Pick #	Overall	Name	Position	College
1	9	9	Larry Buhler	Back	Minnesota
3	9	24	Charley Brock ^{#}	Center	Nebraska
5	9	39	Lynn Hovland	Guard	Wisconsin
6	9	49	Larry Craig ^{#}	Quarterback	South Carolina
7	9	59	Frank Twedell	Guard	Minnesota
8	9	69	Paul Kell	Tackle	Notre Dame
9	9	79	Johnny Hall	Wingback	TCU
10	9	89	Vince Gavre	Back	Wisconsin
11	9	99	Charley Sprague	End	SMU
13	9	119	Dan Elmer	Center	Minnesota
14	9	129	Bill Badgett	Tackle	Georgia
15	9	139	Tom Greenfield	Center	Arizona
16	9	149	Roy Bellin	Back	Wisconsin
17	9	159	John Yerby	End	Oregon
18	9	169	Frank Balasz	Fullback	Iowa
19	9	179	John Brennan	Guard	Michigan
20	9	189	Charles Schultz	Tackle	Minnesota
21	4	194	Willard Hofer	Back	Notre Dame
22	4	199	Bill Gunther	Back	Santa Clara

== 1940 draft ==
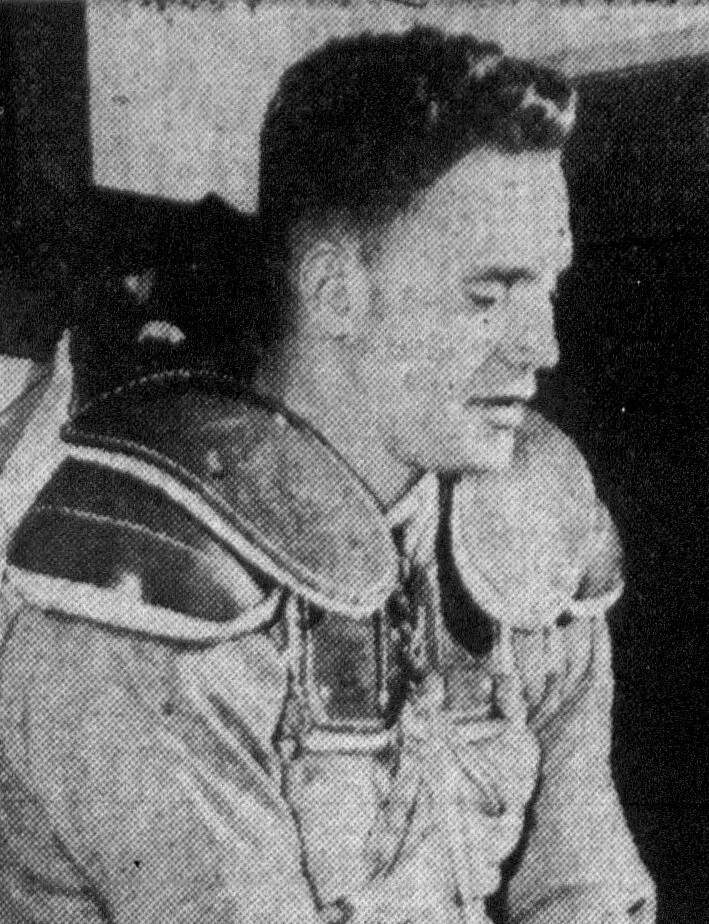
Hal Van Every was the Packers' first-round selection in the 1940 draft.

Green Bay Packers draft selections in 1940Source: Pro-Football-Reference.com
Round	Pick #	Overall	Name	Position	College
1	9	9	Hal Van Every	Tailback	Minnesota
3	9	24	Lou Brock ^{#}	Back	Purdue
5	9	39	Esco Sarkkinen	End	Ohio St.
6	9	49	Dick Cassiano	Back	Pittsburgh
7	9	59	Millard White	Tackle	Tulane
8	9	69	George Seeman	End	Nebraska
9	9	79	J. R. Manley	Guard	Oklahoma
10	9	89	Jack Brown	Back	Purdue
11	9	99	Don Guritz	Guard	Northwestern
12	9	109	Phil Gaspar	Tackle	USC
13	9	119	Ambrose Schindler	Back	USC
14	9	129	Bill Kerr	End	Notre Dame
15	9	139	Mel Brewer	Guard	Illinois
16	9	149	Ray Andrus	Back	Vanderbilt
17	9	159	Archie Kodros	Center	Michigan
18	9	169	Jim Gillette	Halfback	Virginia
19	9	179	Al Matuza	Center	—
20	9	189	Jim Reeder	Tackle	Illinois
21	4	194	Vince Eichler	Back	Cornell
22	4	199	Henry Luebcke	Tackle	Iowa

== 1941 draft ==
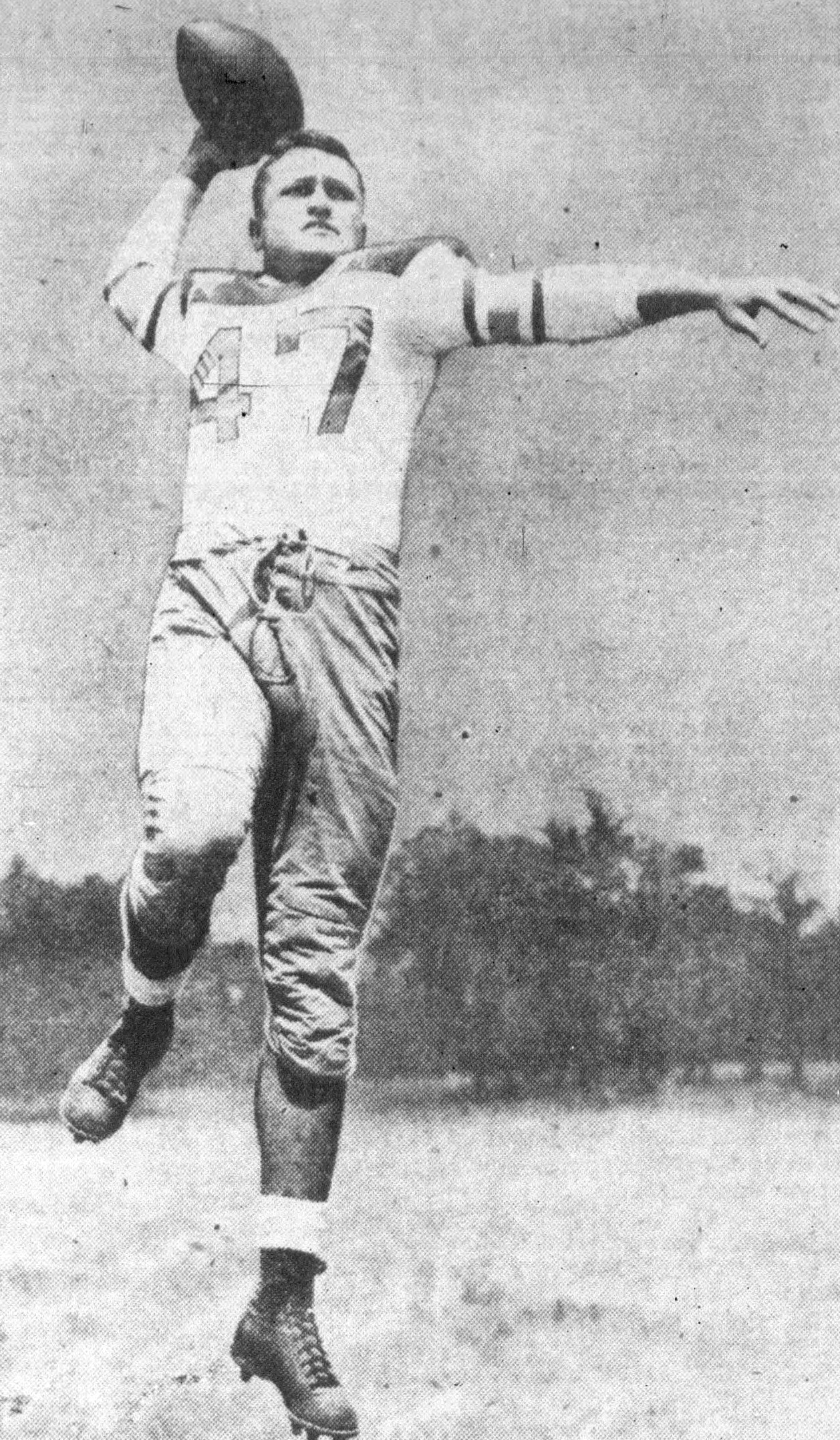
Herm Rohrig was the Packers' sixth-round draft pick in the 1945 draft.

Green Bay Packers draft selections in 1941Source: Pro-Football-Reference.com
Round	Pick #	Overall	Name	Position	College
1	7	7	George Paskvan	Fullback	Wisconsin
3	6	21	Bob Paffrath	Back	Minnesota
5	7	37	Ed Frutig	End	Michigan
6	6	46	Herm Rohrig	Wingback	Nebraska
7	7	57	Bill Telesmanic	End	San Francisco
8	6	66	Bill Kuusisto	Guard	Minnesota
9	7	77	Tony Canadeo ‡	Halfback	Gonzaga
10	6	86	Mike Byelene	Back	Purdue
11	7	97	Paul Heimenz	Center	Northwestern
12	6	106	Mike Enich	Tackle	Iowa
13	7	117	Ed Heffernan	Back	—
14	6	127	Del Lyman	Tackle	UCLA
15	7	137	Johnny Frieberger	End	Arkansas
16	6	146	Ernie Pannell	Tackle	Texas A&M
17	7	157	Bob Saggau	Back	Notre Dame
18	6	166	Helge Pukema	Guard	Minnesota
19	7	177	Bob Hayes	End	Toledo
20	6	186	Jim Strasbaugh	Halfback	Ohio St.
21	2	192	Joe Bailey	Center	Kentucky
22	1	196	Bruno Malinowski	Back	Holy Cross

== 1942 draft ==
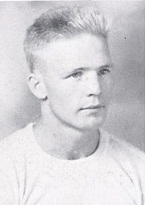
Bob Ingalls was the Packers' eighteenth-round selection in the 1942 draft.

Green Bay Packers draft selections in 1942Source: Pro-Football-Reference.com
Round	Pick #	Overall	Name	Position	College
1	9	9	Urban Odson	Tackle	Minnesota
3	9	24	Ray Frankowski	Guard	Washington
5	9	39	Bill Green	Back	Iowa
6	9	49	Joe Krivonak	Guard	South Carolina
7	9	59	Preston Johnson	Halfback	SMU
8	9	69	Joe Rogers	End	Michigan
9	9	79	Noah Langdale	Tackle	Alabama
10	9	89	Gene Flick	Center	Minnesota
11	9	99	Tom Farris	Quarterback	Wisconsin
12	9	109	Jimmy Richardson	Back	Marquette
13	9	119	Bruce Smith	Halfback	Minnesota
14	9	129	Bill Applegate	Guard	South Carolina
15	9	139	Jim Trimble	Tackle	Indiana
16	9	149	Tom Kinkade	Back	Ohio St.
17	9	159	Fred Peston	End	Nebraska
18	9	169	Bob Ingalls	Center	Michigan
19	9	179	George Benson	Back	Northwestern
20	9	189	Horace Young	Back	SMU
21	4	194	Henry Woronicz	End	Boston College
22	4	199	Woody Adams	Tackle	TCU

== 1943 draft ==
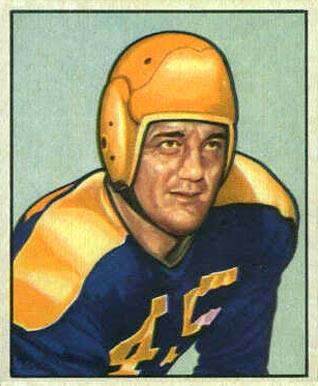
Dick Wildung was the Packers' first-round selection in the 1943 draft.

Nick Susoeff was the Packers' sixth-round selection in he 1943 draft.

Green Bay Packers draft selections in 1943Source: Pro-Football-Reference.com
Round	Pick #	Overall	Name	Position	College
1	8	8	Dick Wildung ^{#}	Tackle	Minnesota
3	8	23	Irv Comp ^{#}	Back	Benedictine
5	8	38	Roy McKay	Tailback	Texas
6	8	48	Nick Susoeff	End	Washington St.
7	8	58	Ken Snelling	Fullback	UCLA
8	8	68	Lester Gatewood	Center	Tulane
9	8	78	Norm Verry	Tackle	USC
10	8	88	Solon Barnett	Guard	Baylor
11	8	98	Bob Forte ^{#}	Halfback	Arkansas
12	8	108	Van Davis	Defensive end	Georgia
13	8	118	Tom Brock	Center	Notre Dame
14	8	128	Ralph Tate	Back	Oklahoma St.
15	8	138	Don Carlson	Tackle	Denver
16	8	148	Mike Welch	Back	Minnesota
17	8	158	Ron Thomas	Guard	USC
18	8	168	Jim Powers	Tackle	—
19	8	178	Hal Prescott	End	Hardin-Simmons
20	8	188	Eddie Forrest	Guard	Santa Clara
21	8	198	Lloyd Wasserbach	Tackle	Wisconsin
22	8	208	Mark Hoskins	Back	Wisconsin
23	8	218	Jug Bennett	Guard	Hardin-Simmons
24	8	228	George Zellick	End	Oregon St.
25	8	238	Gene Bierhaus	End	Minnesota
26	8	248	George Makris	Guard	Wisconsin
27	8	258	Pete Susick	Back	Washington
28	8	268	Bud Hasse	End	Northwestern
29	8	278	Dick Thornally	Tackle	Wisconsin
30	8	288	Bob Ray	Back	Wisconsin
31	3	293	Brunel Christensen	Tackle	California
32	3	298	Ken Roskie	Fullback	South Carolina

== 1944 draft ==
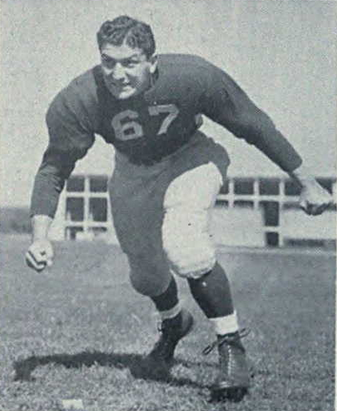
Merv Pregulman was the Packers' first-round selection in the 1944 draft.

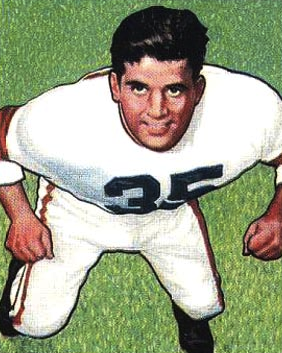
Alex Agase was the Packers' eighth-round selection in the 1944 draft.

Green Bay Packers draft selections in 1944Source: Pro-Football-Reference.com
Round	Pick #	Overall	Name	Position	College
1	7	7	Merv Pregulman	Center	Michigan
3	6	22	Tom Kuzma	Back	Michigan
5	6	38	Bill McPartland	Tackle	—
6	6	49	Mickey McCardle	Back	USC
7	6	60	Jack Tracy	End	Washington
8	6	71	Alex Agase	Linebacker	Illinois
9	6	82	Don Whitmire	Tackle	Navy
10	6	93	Bob Koch	Back	Oregon
11	6	104	Virgil Johnson	End	Arkansas
12	6	115	Roy Giusti	Back	—
13	6	126	Bill Baughman	Center	Alabama
14	6	137	Don Griffin	Halfback	Illinois
15	6	148	Bert Gissler	End	Nebraska
16	6	159	Lou Shelton	Back	Oregon St.
17	6	170	Charley Cusick	Guard	Colgate
18	6	181	Hugh Cox	Back	North Carolina
19	6	192	Kermit Davis	End	Mississippi St.
20	6	203	Bob Johnson	Center	Purdue
21	6	214	Jim Cox	Guard	Stanford
22	6	225	Cliff Anderson	End	Minnesota
23	6	236	John Wesley Perry	Back	Duke
24	6	247	Pete DeMaria	Guard	Purdue
25	6	258	Len Liss	Tackle	Marquette
26	6	269	Ray Jordan	Back	North Carolina
27	6	280	Al Grubaugh	Tackle	Nebraska
28	6	291	A. B. Howard	End	Mississippi St.
29	6	302	Paul Paladino	Guard	Arkansas
30	6	313	Bob Butchofsky	Back	Texas A&M
31	1	319	Russ Deal	Guard	Indiana
32	1	325	Abel Gonzales	Back	SMU

== 1945 draft ==
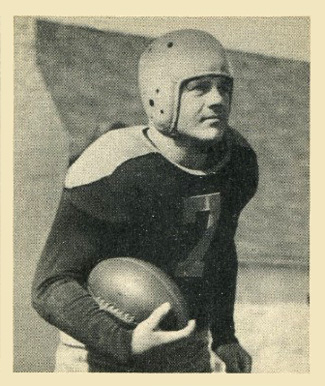
Walt Schlinkman was the Packers' first-round selection in the 1945 draft.

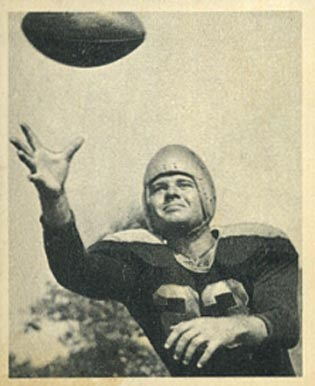
Clyde Goodnight was the Packers' second-round selection in the 1945 draft.

Green Bay Packers draft selections in 1945Source: Pro-Football-Reference.com
Round	Pick #	Overall	Name	Position	College
1	11	11	Walt Schlinkman	Fullback	Texas Tech
3	11	27	Clyde Goodnight	End	Tulsa
5	11	43	Joe Graham	End	Florida
6	11	54	Don Wells	End	Georgia
7	11	65	Casey Stephenson	Back	Tennessee
8	11	76	Toby Collins	Tackle	Tulsa
9	11	87	Lamar Dingler	End	Arkansas
10	11	98	Hal Helscher	Back	LSU
11	11	109	Ralph Hammond	Center	Pittsburgh
12	11	120	Ed Podgorski	Tackle	Lafayette
13	11	131	Bill Hackett	Guard	Ohio St.
14	11	142	Marv Lindsey	Back	Arkansas
15	11	153	Robert McClure	Tackle	Nevada
16	11	164	Harry Pieper	Center	California
17	11	175	Bob Kula	Back	Minnesota
18	11	186	Frank Hazard	Guard	Nebraska
19	11	197	Ed Jeffers	Guard	Oklahoma St.
20	11	208	Bill Prentice	Back	Santa Clara
21	11	219	Warren Fuller	End	Fordham
22	11	230	Fred Nielsen	Tackle	—
23	11	241	Bob Gilmore	Back	Washington
24	11	252	Lloyd Baxter	Center	SMU
25	11	263	Nolan Luhn	End	Tulsa
26	11	274	Nestor Blanco	Guard	Colorado Mines
27	11	285	Bill Chestnut	Back	Kansas
28	11	296	Jim Thompson	Back	Washington St.
29	11	307	Jim Evans	End	Idaho
30	11	318	Ham Nichols	Guard	Rice
31	6	324	John Priday	Back	Ohio St.
32	6	330	Billy Joe Aldridge	Back	Oklahoma St.

== 1946 draft ==
Johnny Strzykalski was the Packers' first-round selection in the 1946 draft.

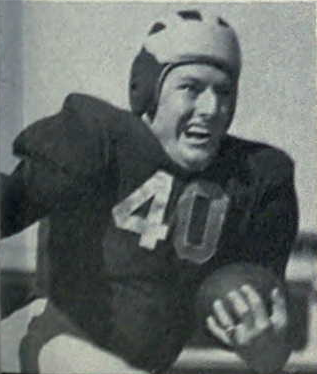
Bob Nussbaumer was the Packers' second-round selection in the 1946 draft.

Green Bay Packers draft selections in 1946Source: Pro-Football-Reference.com
Round	Pick #	Overall	Name	Position	College
1	6	6	Johnny Strzykalski	Halfback	Marquette
3	6	21	Bob Nussbaumer	Halfback	Michigan
5	6	36	Ed Cody	Fullback	Purdue
6	6	46	John Ferraro	Tackle	USC
7	6	56	Art Renner	End	Michigan
8	6	66	Bert Cole	Tackle	Oklahoma St.
9	6	76	Grant Darnell	Guard	Texas A&M
10	6	86	Joe McAfee	Back	Holy Cross
11	6	96	Steve Conroy	Back	Holy Cross
12	6	106	Billy Hildebrand	End	Mississippi St.
13	6	116	Tom Hand	Center	Iowa
14	6	126	George Hills	Guard	Georgia Tech
15	6	136	Jim Hough	Back	Clemson
16	6	146	Dean Gaines	Tackle	Georgia Tech
17	6	156	J. P. Miller	Guard	Georgia
18	6	166	Boyd Morse	End	Arizona
19	6	176	Joe Bradford	Center	USC
20	6	186	Bill DeRosa	Back	Boston College
21	6	196	Ralph Grant	Back	Bucknell
22	6	206	Howie Brown	Guard	Indiana
23	6	216	Andy Kosmac	Center	LSU
24	6	226	Maurice Stacy	Back	Washington
25	6	236	Chick Davidson	Tackle	Cornell
26	6	246	John Norton	Back	Washington
27	6	256	Ed Holtsinger	Back	Georgia Tech
28	6	266	Joe Campbell	End	Holy Cross
29	6	276	Francis Saunders	Tackle	Clemson
30	6	286	Al Sparlis	Guard	UCLA
31	1	291	Ralph Clymer	Guard	Purdue
32	1	296	Joervin Henderson	Center	Missouri

== 1947 draft ==
Ernie Case was the Packers' first-round selection in the 1947 draft.

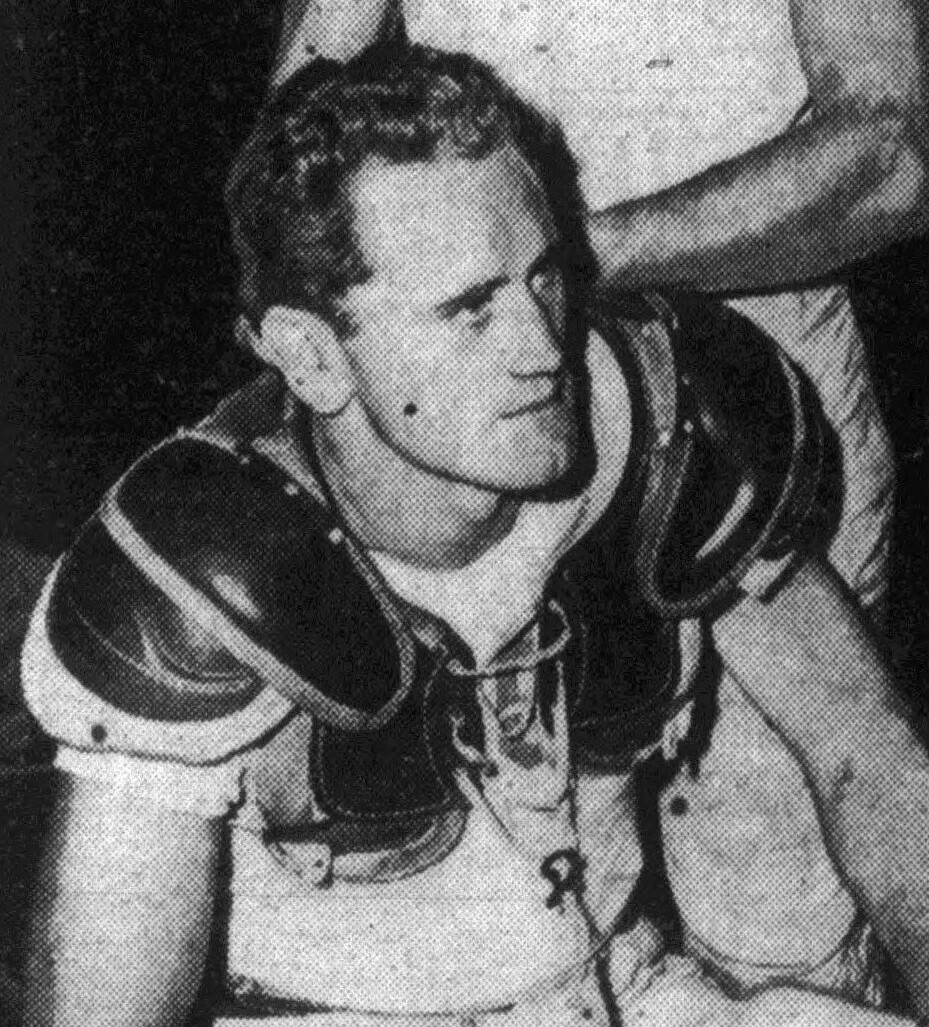
Burr Baldwin was the Packers' second-round selection in the 1947 draft.

Green Bay Packers draft selections in 1947Source: Pro-Football-Reference.com
Round	Pick #	Overall	Name	Position	College
1	6	6	Ernie Case	Quarterback	UCLA
3	7	20	Burr Baldwin	End	UCLA
5	6	31	Buddy Burris	Guard	Oklahoma
6	5	40	Gene Wilson	End	SMU
7	7	52	Dick Connors	Back	Northwestern
8	7	62	Monte Moncrief	Tackle	Texas A&M
9	7	72	Bob McDougal	Fullback	Miami (FL)
10	6	81	Bob Kelly	Halfback	Navy
11	7	92	Tom Moulton	Center	Oklahoma St.
12	5	100	George Hills	Guard	Georgia Tech
13	6	111	Bob Skoglund	Defensive end	Notre Dame
14	7	122	Jack Mitchell	Back	Oklahoma
15	5	130	Denny Crawford	Guard	Tennessee
16	6	141	Jim Callanan	End	USC
17	6	151	Ted Scalissi	Halfback	Ripon
18	5	160	Jim Goodman	Tackle	Indiana
19	7	172	Dick Miller	Guard	Lawrence
20	6	181	Brad Ecklund	Center	Oregon
21	5	190	Bob West	Back	Colorado
22	7	202	Maurice Reilly	Back	Colorado
23	6	211	Ron Sockolov	Tackle	California
24	5	220	Herb St. John	Guard	Georgia
25	7	232	Fred Redeker	Back	Cincinnati
26	6	241	Herm Lubker	End	Arkansas
27	5	250	Bob Palladino	Back	Notre Dame
28	7	262	Jerrell Baxter	Tackle	North Carolina
29	6	271	Ray Sellers	End	Georgia
30	5	280	Jerry Carle	Back	Northwestern
31	5	290	Bill Hogan	Back	Kansas
32	4	297	Ralph Olsen	Defensive end	Utah

== 1948 draft ==
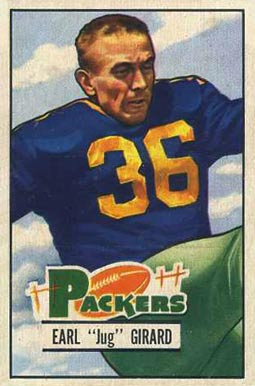
Jug Girard was the Packers' first-round selection in the 1948 draft.

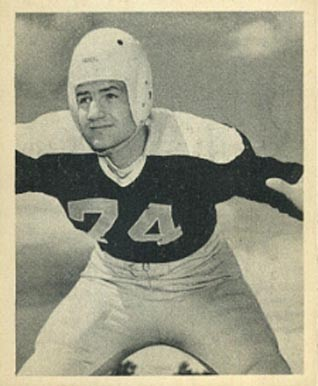
Larry Olsonoski was the Packers' sixth-round selection in the 1948 draft.

Green Bay Packers draft selections in 1948Source: Pro-Football-Reference.com
Round	Pick #	Overall	Name	Position	College
1	7	7	Jug Girard	End	Wisconsin
3	6	19	Oscar Smith	Halfback	UTEP
5	2	27	Don Richards	Tackle	Arkansas
5	6	31	Weyman Sellers	End	Georgia
6	6	41	Larry Olsonoski	Guard	Minnesota
7	6	51	Jay Rhodemyre	Center	Kentucky
8	6	61	Bob Cunz	Tackle	Illinois
10	6	81	George Walmsley	Back	Rice
11	6	91	Bob Hodges	Tackle	Bradley
12	6	101	Bob Rennebohm	End	Wisconsin
13	6	111	Perry Moss	Quarterback	Illinois
14	6	121	Fred Provo	Halfback	Washington
15	6	131	Lou Agase	Tackle	Illinois
16	6	141	Travis Raven	Back	Texas
18	6	161	Ken Balge	End	Michigan St.
19	6	171	Charley Tatom	Tackle	Texas
20	6	181	Floyd Thomas	Center	Arkansas
21	6	191	Herb St. John	Guard	Georgia
22	6	201	Don Anderson	Back	Rice
23	6	211	Fred Kling	Back	Missouri
24	6	221	Clyde Biggers	Tackle	Catawba
25	6	231	Stan Heath	Quarterback	Nevada
26	6	241	Aubrey Allen	Tackle	Colorado
27	6	251	Stan Gorski	—	Saint Mary's (MN)
28	6	261	Don Sharp	Center	Tulsa
29	6	271	John Panelli	Back	Notre Dame
30	6	281	Clarence McGeary	Defensive tackle	North Dakota St.
31	4	289	Gayland Mills	End	BYU
32	3	296	Ralph Earhart	Halfback	Texas Tech

== 1949 draft ==
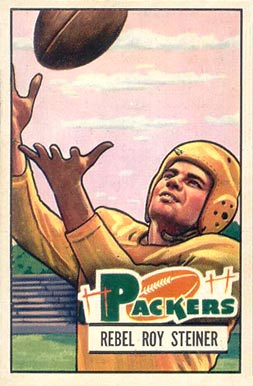
Rebel Steiner was the Packers' twelfth-round selection in the 1949 draft.

Green Bay Packers draft selections in 1949Source: Pro-Football-Reference.com
Round	Pick #	Overall	Name	Position	College
1	5	5	Stan Heath	Quarterback	Nevada
2	4	15	Dan Dworsky	Linebacker	Michigan
3	4	25	Lou Ferry	Defensive tackle	Villanova
4	3	34	Bob Summerhays	Linebacker	Utah
5	2	43	Glenn Lewis	Back	Texas Tech
6	3	54	Joe Ethridge	Tight end	SMU
8	3	74	Dan Orlich	Defensive end	UNLV
9	2	83	Everett Faunce	Back	Minnesota
11	2	103	Harry Larche	Tackle	Arkansas St.
12	3	114	Rebel Steiner	Defensive back	Alabama
13	2	123	Al Mastrangeli	Center	Illinois
14	3	134	Bobby Williams	Center	Texas Tech
15	2	143	Ken Cooper	Guard	Vanderbilt
16	3	154	Gene Remenar	Tackle	West Virginia
17	2	163	Paul Devine	Back	Heidelberg
18	3	174	Floyd Lewis	Guard	SMU
19	2	183	Bobby Folsom	End	SMU
20	3	194	Larry Cooney	Back	Penn St.
21	2	203	Ken Kranz	Defensive back	Wisconsin-Milwaukee
22	3	214	John Kordich	Back	USC
23	2	223	Bill Kelley	End	Texas Tech
24	3	234	Jimmy Ford	Back	Tulsa
25	2	243	Frank Lambright	Guard	Arkansas

== 1950 AAFC dispersal draft ==
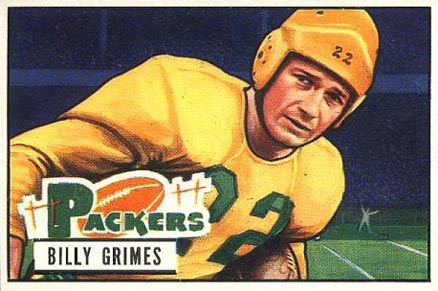
Billy Grimes was the Packers' first-round selection in the AAFC dispersal draft.

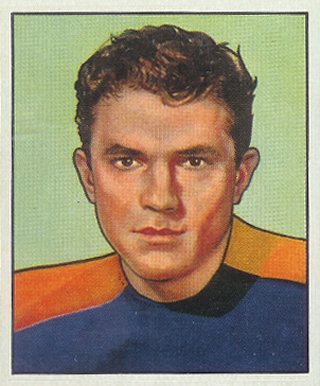
Alton Baldwin was the Packers' second-round selection in the AAFC dispersal draft.

Green Bay Packers AAFC dispersal draft selections in 1950Source: ProFootballResearchers.org
Round	Pick #	Overall	Name	Position	AAFC Team
1	3	3	Billy Grimes	Halfback	Los Angeles Dons
2	3	16	Alton Baldwin	End	Buffalo Bills
3	3	29	Homer Paine	Tackle	Chicago Hornets
Extra	2	41	James Lukens	End	Buffalo Bills
Extra	4	23	Abner Wimberly	End	Los Angeles Dons
4	3	46	Wilbur Volz	Halfback	Buffalo Bills
5	3	59	John Kerns	Tackle	Buffalo Bills
Extra	2	71	Ted Cook	End	
6	3	74	Jason Bailey	Tackle	Chicago Hornets
7	3	87	Denny Crawford	Tackle	New York Yankees
Extra	2	99	Carl Schuette	Center	Buffalo Bills
8	3	102	Zygmont Czarobski	Tackle	Chicago Hornets
9	3	115	Vic Schleich	Tackle	Chicago Hornets
Extra	2	127	Paul Duke	Center	New York Yankees
10	3	130	R. M. Patterson	Tackle	Chicago Hornets

== 1950 draft ==
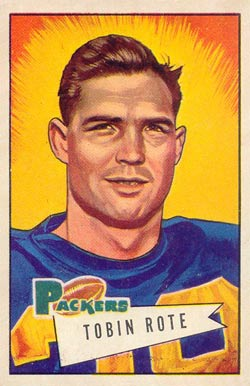
Tobin Rote was the Packers' second-round selection in the 1950 draft.

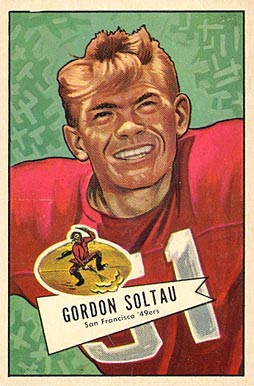
Gordy Soltau was the Packers' third-round selection in the 1950 draft.

Green Bay Packers draft selections in 1950Source: Pro-Football-Reference.com
Round	Pick #	Overall	Name	Position	College
1	4	4	Clayton Tonnemaker	Linebacker	Minnesota
2	3	17	Tobin Rote ^{#}	Quarterback	Rice
3	3	30	Gordy Soltau	End	Minnesota
4	3	43	Larry Coutre	Halfback	Notre Dame
6	3	69	Jack Cloud	Linebacker	William & Mary
7	3	82	Leon Manley	Tackle	Oklahoma
8	3	95	Harry Szulborski	Back	Purdue
9	3	108	Roger Wilson	End	South Carolina
10	3	121	Bob Mealey	Tackle	Minnesota
11	3	134	Gene Lorendo	End	Georgia
12	3	147	Andy Pavich	End	Denver
13	3	160	Carlton Elliott	Defensive end	Virginia
14	3	173	Fred Leon	Tackle	Nevada
15	3	186	Gene Huebern	Center	Baylor
16	3	199	Frank Kuzma	Back	Minnesota
17	3	212	Hal Otterback	Guard	Wisconsin
18	3	225	Arnold Galiffa	Quarterback	Army
19	3	238	Earl Rowan	Tackle	Hardin-Simmons
20	3	251	Jim Howe	Back	Kentucky
21	3	264	Gene Evans	Back	Wisconsin
22	3	277	Chuck Beatty	Center	Penn St.
23	3	290	George Mattey	Guard	Ohio St.
24	3	303	Don Delph	Back	Dayton
25	3	316	Frank Waters	Back	Michigan St.
26	3	329	Claude Radtke	End	Lawrence
27	3	342	Bill Osborne	Back	Nevada
28	3	355	Herm Hering	Back	Rutgers
29	3	368	Ben Zaranka	End	Kentucky
30	3	381	Ray Mallouf	Quarterback	SMU

== 1951 draft ==
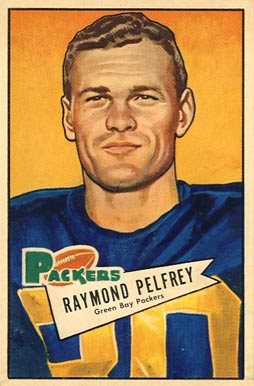
Ray Pelfrey was the Packers' seventeenth-round selection in the 1951 draft.

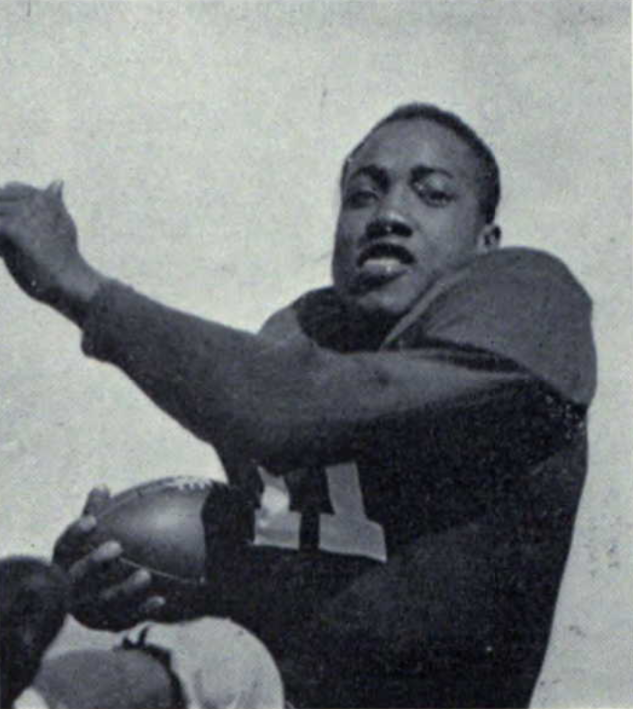
Ed Withers was the Packers' thirtieth-round selection in the 1951 draft.

Green Bay Packers draft selections in 1951Source: Pro-Football-Reference.com
Round	Pick #	Overall	Name	Position	College
1	5	5	Bob Gain	Defensive tackle	Kentucky
2	2	16	Albin Collins	Back	LSU
3	1	27	Fred Cone ^{#}	Fullback	Clemson
5	2	52	Wade Stinson	Back	Kansas
6	1	63	Sig Holowenko	Tackle	John Carroll
7	3	77	Bill Sutherland	End	Saint Vincent
9	1	99	Dick McWilliams	Tackle	Michigan
10	4	114	Bob Noppinger	Tackle	—
11	2	125	George Rooks	Back	Morgan St.
12	1	136	Carl Kreager	Center	Michigan
13	3	150	Ed Stephens	Back	Missouri
14	2	161	Ray Bauer	End	Montana
15	1	172	Joe Ernst	Back	Tulane
16	3	186	Dick Afflis	Tackle	Nevada
17	2	197	Ray Pelfrey	End	Eastern Kentucky
18	1	208	Ed Petela	Back	Boston College
19	3	222	Jim Liber	Back	—
20	2	233	Dick Johnson	Tackle	Virginia
21	1	244	Art Edling	End	Minnesota
22	3	258	Art Felker	End	Marquette
23	2	269	Tubba Chamberlain	Guard	Wisconsin–Eau Claire
24	1	280	Dick Christie	Back	Nebraska-Omaha
25	3	294	Monte Charles	Back	Hillsdale
26	2	305	Bill Miller	Tackle	Ohio St.
27	1	316	Bob Bossons	Center	Georgia Tech
28	3	330	Bob Ayre	Back	Abilene Christian
29	2	341	Ralph Fieler	End	Miami (FL)
30	1	352	Ed Withers	Back	Wisconsin

== 1952 draft ==
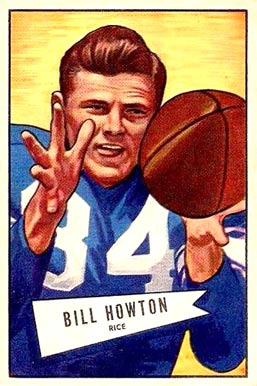
Billy Howton was the Packers' first-round selection in the 1952 draft.

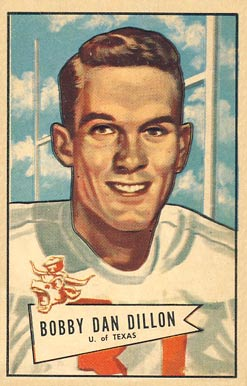
Bobby Dillon was the Packers' second-round selection in the 1952 draft.

Green Bay Packers draft selections in 1952Source: Pro-Football-Reference.com
Round	Pick #	Overall	Name	Position	College
1	4	4	Babe Parilli	Quarterback	Kentucky
2	2	15	Billy Howton ^{#}	End	Rice
3	3	28	Bobby Dillon ‡	Defensive back	Texas
5	3	52	Dave Hanner ^{#}	Defensive tackle	Arkansas
6	2	63	Tom Johnson	Defensive tackle	Michigan
7	3	76	Bill Reichardt	Fullback	Iowa
8	2	87	Mel Becket	Center	Indiana
9	3	100	Deral Teteak ^{#}	Linebacker	Wisconsin
10	2	111	Art Kleinschmidt	Guard	Tulane
10	7	116	William Roffler	Defensive back	Washington St.
11	3	124	Billy Burkhalter	Back	Rice
12	2	135	Bill Wilson	Tackle	Texas
13	3	148	Billy Hair	Back	Clemson
14	2	159	Jack Morgan	Tackle	Michigan St.
15	3	172	Bobby Jack Floyd	Fullback	TCU
16	2	183	Johnny Coatta	Back	Wisconsin
17	3	196	Don Peterson	Back	Michigan
18	2	207	Howard Tisdale	Tackle	Stephen F. Austin
19	3	220	John Pont	Back	Miami (OH)
20	2	231	Chuck Boerio	Linebacker	Illinois
21	3	244	Herb Zimmerman	Guard	TCU
22	2	255	Karl Kluckholn	End	Colgate
23	3	268	Frank Kapral	Guard	Michigan St.
24	2	279	John Schuetzner	End	South Carolina
25	3	292	Charlie LaPradd	Tackle	Florida
26	2	303	Charlie Stokes	Tackle	Tennessee
27	3	316	I. D. Russell	Back	SMU
28	2	327	Billy Barrett	Back	Notre Dame
29	3	340	Bill Stratton	Back	Lewis
30	2	351	Jack Fulkerson	Tackle	Southern Miss

== 1953 draft ==
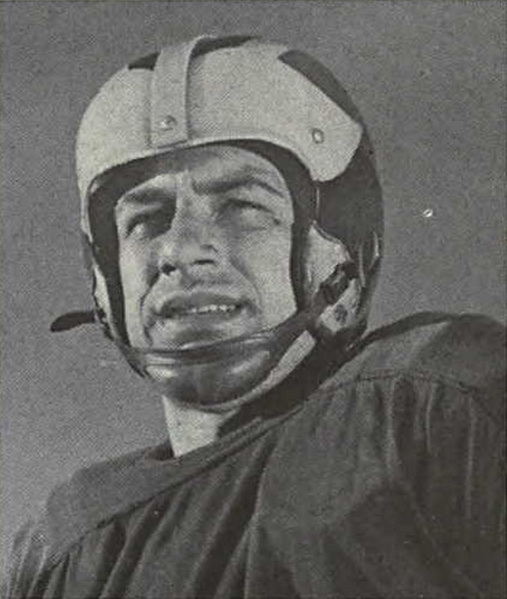
Roger Zatkoff was the Packers' fifth-round selection in the 1953 draft.

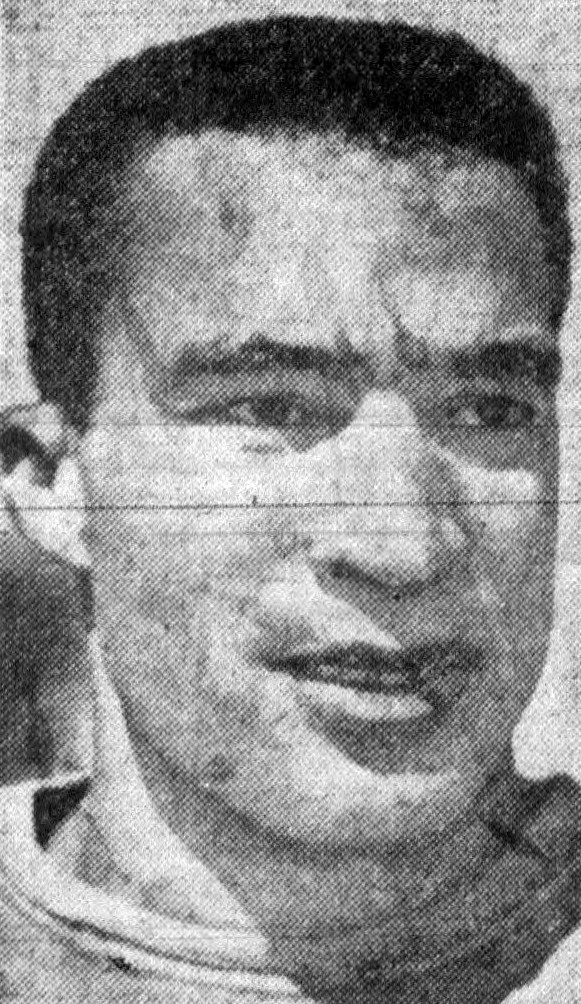
Ike Jones was the Packers' twenty-fifth-round selection in the 1953 draft.

Green Bay Packers draft selections in 1953Source: Pro-Football-Reference.com
Round	Pick #	Overall	Name	Position	College
1	7	7	Al Carmichael ^{#}	Halfback	USC
2	6	19	Gil Reich	Back	Kansas
3	6	31	Bill Forester ^{#}	Linebacker	SMU
4	6	43	Gib Dawson	Halfback	Texas
5	6	55	Roger Zatkoff	Linebacker	Michigan
6	6	67	Bob Kennedy	Guard	Wisconsin
7	6	79	Jim Ringo ‡	Center	Syracuse
8	6	91	Lauren Hargrove	Back	Georgia
9	6	103	Floyd Harrawood	Tackle	Tulsa
10	6	115	Vic Rimkus	Guard	Holy Cross
11	6	127	Joe Johnson	Halfback	Boston College
12	6	139	Dick Curran	Back	Arizona St.
13	6	151	Bob Orders	Center	West Virginia
14	6	163	Charley Wrenn	Tackle	TCU
15	6	175	Gene Helwig	Back	Tulsa
16	6	187	John Hlay	Back	Ohio St.
17	6	199	Bill Georges	End	Texas
18	6	211	Jim Philee	Back	Bradley
19	6	223	Bill Lucky	Tackle	Baylor
20	6	235	John Harville	Back	TCU
21	6	247	Bob Conway	Back	Alabama
22	6	259	Bill Turnbeaugh	Tackle	Auburn
23	6	271	Bill Murray	End	American International
24	6	283	Jim Haslam	Tackle	Tennessee
25	6	295	Ike Jones	End	UCLA
26	6	307	George Bozanic	Back	USC
27	6	319	Jim McConaughey	End	Houston
28	6	331	Zack Jordan	Back	Colorado
29	6	343	Henry O'Brien	Guard	Boston College
30	6	355	Al Barry	Guard	USC

== 1954 draft ==
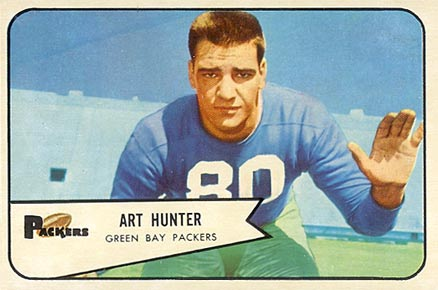
Art Hunter was one of the Packers' first-round selections in the 1954 draft.

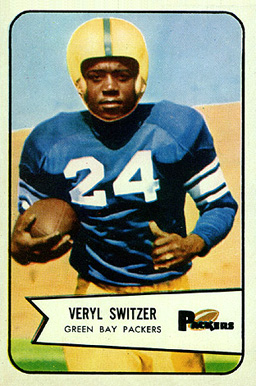
Veryl Switzer was one of the Packers' first-round selections in the 1954 draft.

Green Bay Packers draft selections in 1954Source: Pro-Football-Reference.com
Round	Pick #	Overall	Name	Position	College
1	3	3	Art Hunter	Center	Notre Dame
1	4	4	Veryl Switzer	Halfback	Kansas St.
2	2	15	Bob Fleck	Tackle	Syracuse
3	2	27	George Timberlake	Linebacker	USC
4	3	40	Tommy Allman	Back	West Virginia
5	2	51	Max McGee ^{#}	End	Tulane
7	2	75	Sam Marshall	Tackle	Florida A&M
8	2	87	Jimmie Williams	Tackle	Texas Tech
9	2	99	Dave Davis	End	Georgia Tech
10	2	111	Gene Knutson	Defensive end	Michigan
11	2	123	Ken Hall	End	North Texas
12	2	135	Bill Oliver	Back	Alabama
13	2	147	Mike Takacs	Guard	Ohio St.
14	2	159	Dave Johnson	Back	Rice
16	2	183	Des Koch	Back	USC
17	2	195	J. D. Roberts	Guard	Oklahoma
18	2	207	Emery Barnes	Defensive end	Oregon
19	2	219	Ken Hall	Center	Springfield (MA)
20	2	231	Lowell Herbert	Guard	Pacific
21	2	243	Art Liebscher	Back	Pacific
22	2	255	Willie Buford	Tackle	Morgan St.
23	2	267	Clint Sathrum	Back	St. Olaf
24	2	279	Marv Tennefoss	End	Stanford
25	2	291	John Smalley	Tackle	Alabama
26	2	303	Ralph Baierl	Tackle	Maryland
27	2	315	Hosea Sims	End	Marquette
28	2	327	Evan Slonac	Back	Michigan St.
29	2	339	Jerry Dufek	Tackle	St. Norbert
30	2	351	Terry Campbell	Back	Washington St.

== 1955 draft ==
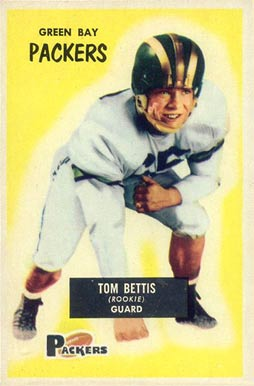
Tom Bettis was the Packers' first-round selection in the 1955 draft.

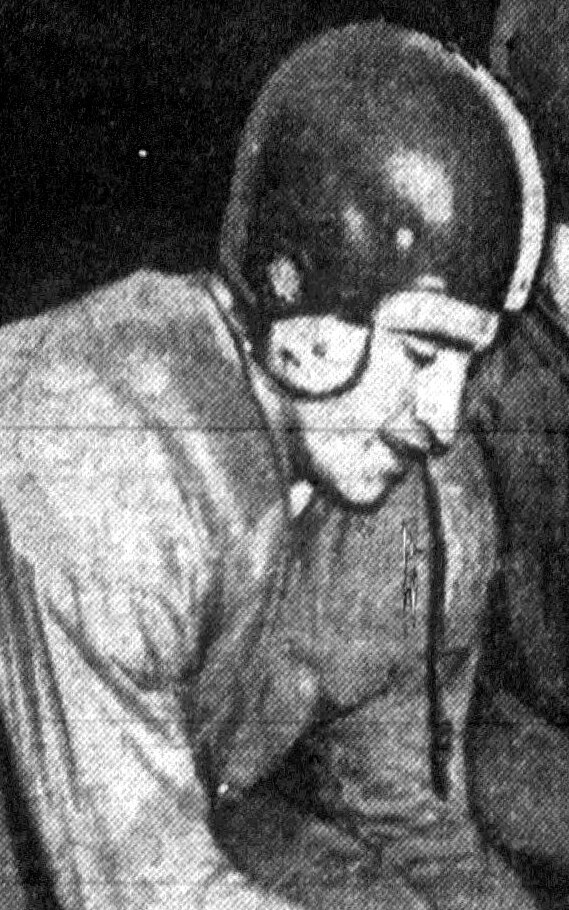
Hank Bullough was the Packers' fifth-round selection in the 1955 draft.

Green Bay Packers draft selections in 1955Source: Pro-Football-Reference.com
Round	Pick #	Overall	Name	Position	College
1	5	5	Tom Bettis	Linebacker	Purdue
2	4	17	Jim Temp	Defensive end	Wisconsin
3	4	29	Buddy Leake	Back	Oklahoma
5	4	53	Hank Bullough	Guard	Michigan St.
6	4	65	Norm Amundsen	Guard	Wisconsin
7	4	77	Bob Clemens	Fullback	Georgia
8	4	89	Johnny Crouch	End	TCU
9	4	101	Ed Culpepper	Defensive tackle	Alabama
10	4	113	George Rogers	Tackle	Auburn
11	4	125	Ron Clark	Back	Nebraska
12	4	137	Art Walker	Tackle	Michigan
13	4	149	Ed Adams	Back	South Carolina
14	4	161	Fred Baer	Back	Michigan
15	4	173	George Machoukas	Center	Toledo
16	4	185	Charlie Brackins	Quarterback	Prairie View A&M
17	4	197	Lynn Beightol	Back	Maryland
18	4	209	Doyle Nix	Defensive back	SMU
19	4	221	Bob Carter	Tackle	Grambling St.
20	4	233	Carl Bolt	Back	Southern Miss
20	7	236	Bob Anowiak	End	Bucknell
21	4	245	Lavell Isbel	Tackle	Houston
22	4	257	Bill Brunner	Back	Arkansas Tech
23	4	269	Elton Shaw	Tackle	LSU
24	4	281	Charley Bryant	Guard	Nebraska
25	4	293	Nate Borden	Defensive end	Indiana
26	4	305	Jim Jennings	Defensive end	Missouri
27	4	317	Bob Peringer	End	Washington St.
28	4	329	Jack Spears	Tackle	Chattanooga
29	4	341	Sam Pino	Back	Boston University
30	3	352	Bob Saia	Back	Tulane

== 1956 draft ==
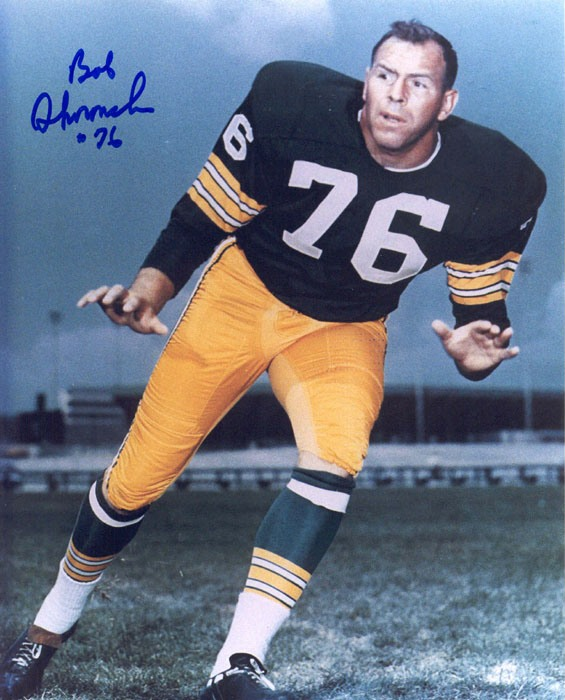
Bob Skoronski was the Packers' fifth-round selection in the 1956 draft.

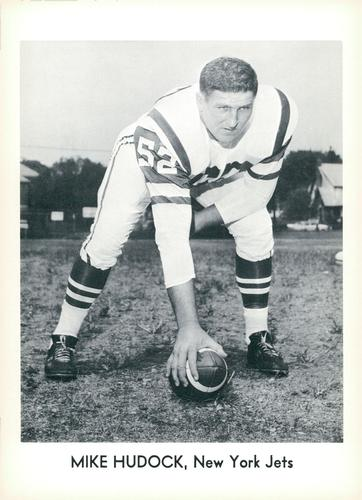
Mike Hudock was the Packers' eleventh-round selection in the 1956 draft.

Green Bay Packers draft selections in 1956Source: Pro-Football-Reference.com
Round	Pick #	Overall	Name	Position	College
1	8	8	Jack Losch	Halfback	Miami (FL)
2	7	20	Forrest Gregg ‡	Tackle	SMU
4	7	44	Cecil Morris	Guard	Oklahoma
5	7	56	Bob Skoronski ^{#}	Tackle	Indiana
6	7	68	Bob Burris	Back	Oklahoma
7	7	80	Hank Gremminger ^{#}	Defensive back	Baylor
8	7	92	Russ Dennis	End	Maryland
9	7	104	Gordy Duvall	Back	USC
10	7	116	Bob Laugherty	Back	Maryland
11	7	128	Mike Hudock	Center	Miami (FL)
12	7	140	Max Burnett	Back	Arizona
13	7	152	Jim Mense	Center	Notre Dame
14	7	164	Charlie Thomas	Back	Wisconsin
15	7	176	Warren Alliston	Linebacker	Ole Miss
16	7	188	Curtis Lynch	Tackle	Alabama
17	7	200	Bart Starr ‡	Quarterback	Alabama
18	7	212	Stan Intihar	End	Cornell
19	7	224	Ken Vakey	End	Texas Tech
20	7	236	Clyde Letbetter	Tackle	Baylor
21	7	248	Hal O'Brien	Back	SMU
22	7	260	Johnny Popson	Back	Furman
23	7	272	Jesse Birchfield	Guard	Duke
24	7	284	Don Wilson	Center	Rice
25	7	296	Franz Koeneke	End	Minnesota
26	7	308	Dick Goehe	Tackle	Ole Miss
27	7	320	Dick Kolian	End	Wisconsin
28	7	332	Bobby Lance	Quarterback	Florida
29	7	344	Vester Newcomb	Center	Southwest JC (MS)
30	6	355	Rod Hermes	Quarterback	Beloit

== 1957 draft ==
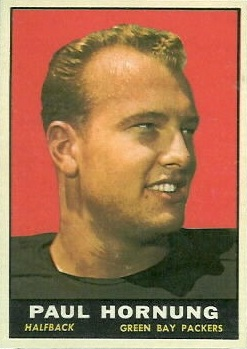
Paul Hornung was one of the Packers' first-round selections in the 1957 draft.

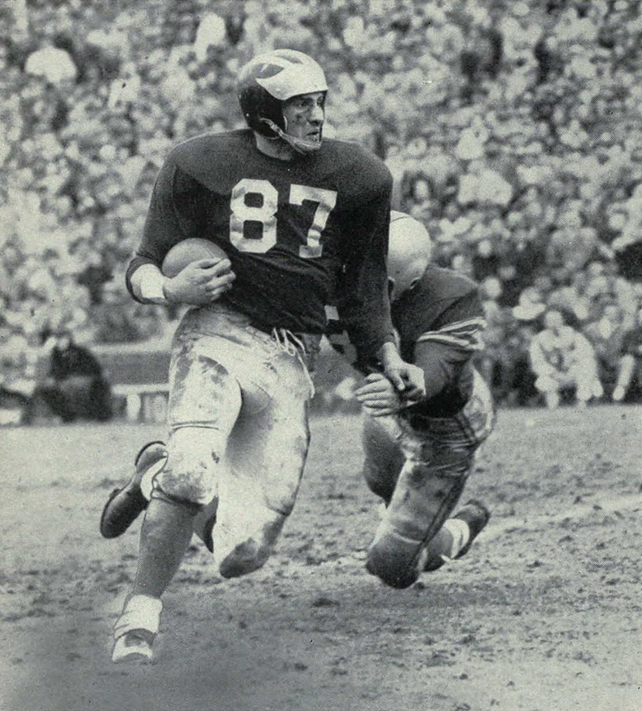
Ron Kramer was one of the Packers' first-round selections in the 1957 draft.

Green Bay Packers draft selections in 1957Source: Pro-Football-Reference.com
Round	Pick #	Overall	Name	Position	College
1	1	1	Paul Hornung ‡	Halfback	Notre Dame
1	4	4	Ron Kramer ^{#}	End	Michigan
2	5	18	Joel Wells	Halfback	Clemson
3	4	29	Dalton Truax	Tackle	Tulane
4	4	41	Carl Vereen	Tackle	Georgia Tech
6	9	70	John Nisby	Guard	Pacific
7	3	76	Frank Gilliam	End	Iowa
8	2	87	George Belotti	Center	USC
9	3	100	Ken Wineberg	Back	TCU
10	2	111	Gary Gustafson	Guard	Gustavus Adolphus
11	3	124	Jim Roseboro	Back	Ohio St.
12	2	135	Ed Sullivan	Center	Notre Dame
12	12	145	Glenn Bestor	Back	Wisconsin
13	3	148	Jim Morse	Back	Notre Dame
14	2	159	Rudy Schoendorf	Tackle	Miami (OH)
15	3	172	Pat Hinton	Guard	Louisiana Tech
16	2	183	Ed Buckingham	Tackle	Minnesota
17	3	196	Don Boudreaux	Tackle	Houston
18	2	207	Credell Green	Back	Washington
19	3	220	Ernie Danjean	Linebacker	Auburn
20	2	231	Percy Oliver	Guard	Illinois
21	3	244	Chuck Mehrer	Tackle	Missouri
22	2	255	Ronnie Quillian	Quarterback	Tulane
23	3	268	John Symank	Defensive back	Florida
24	2	279	Charlie Leyendecker	Tackle	SMU
25	3	292	Jerry Johnson	Tackle	St. Norbert
26	2	303	Buddy Bass	End	Duke
27	3	316	Marty Booher	Tackle	Wisconsin
28	2	327	Dave Herbold	Guard	Minnesota
29	3	340	Howie Dare	Back	Maryland

== 1958 draft ==
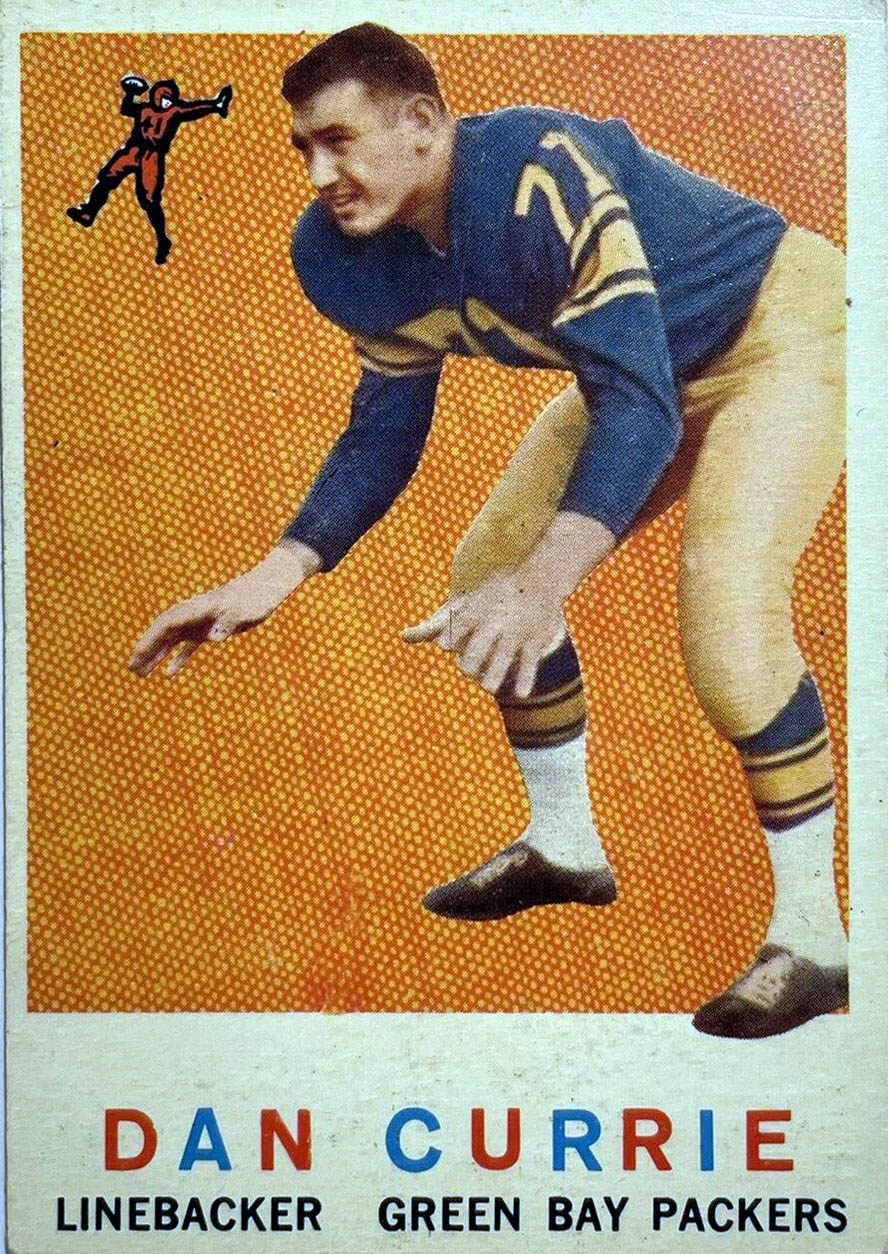
Dan Currie was the Packers' first-round selection in the 1958 draft.

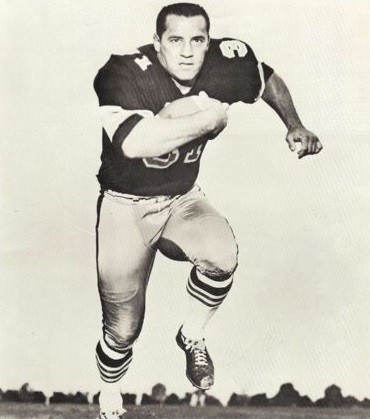
Jim Taylor was the Packers' second-round selection in the 1958 draft.

Green Bay Packers draft selections in 1958Source: Pro-Football-Reference.com
Round	Pick #	Overall	Name	Position	College
1	3	3	Dan Currie ^{#}	Linebacker	Michigan St.
2	2	15	Jim Taylor ‡	Fullback	LSU
3	2	27	Dick Christy	Halfback	North Carolina St.
3	11	36	Ray Nitschke ‡	Linebacker	Illinois
4	2	39	Jerry Kramer ‡	Guard	Idaho
5	2	51	Joe Francis	Quarterback	Oregon St.
6	1	62	Ken Gray	Guard	Howard Payne
7	2	75	Doug Mainson	Back	Hillsdale
8	1	86	Mike Bill	Center	Syracuse
9	2	99	Norm Jarock	Back	St. Norbert
10	1	110	Carl Johnson	Tackle	Illinois
11	2	123	Harry Horton	End	Wichita St.
12	1	134	Wayne Miller	End	Baylor
13	2	147	Gene Cook	End	Toledo
14	1	158	Harry Hauffe	Tackle	South Dakota
15	2	171	Tom Newell	Back	Drake
16	1	182	Arley Finley	Tackle	Georgia Tech
17	2	195	Joe Reese	End	Arkansas Tech
18	1	206	Chuck Strid	Guard	Syracuse
20	1	230	John DuBose	Back	—
21	2	243	Jerry Kershner	Tackle	Oregon
22	1	254	Dick Maggard	Back	College of Idaho
23	2	267	Jack Ashton	Guard	South Carolina
24	1	278	John Jereck	Tackle	Detroit
25	2	291	Larry Plenty	Back	Boston College
26	1	302	Esker Harris	Guard	UCLA
27	2	315	Neil Habig	Center	Purdue
28	1	326	Dave Crowell	Guard	Washington St.
29	2	339	Bob Haynes	Tackle	Sam Houston St.
30	1	350	John Peters	Tackle	Houston

== 1959 draft ==
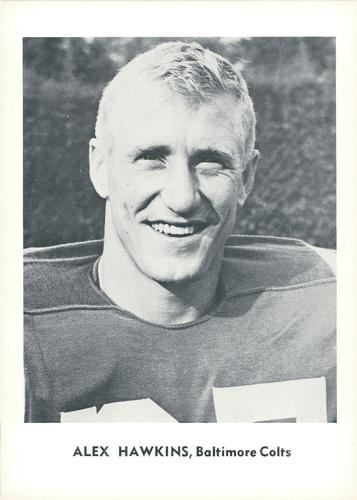
Alex Hawkins was the Packers' second-round selection in the 1959 draft.

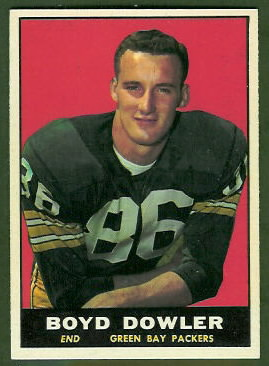
Boyd Dowler was the Packers' third-round selection in the 1959 draft.

Green Bay Packers draft selections in 1959Source: Pro-Football-Reference.com
Round	Pick #	Overall	Name	Position	College
1	1	1	Randy Duncan	Quarterback	Iowa
2	1	13	Alex Hawkins	Halfback	South Carolina
3	1	25	Boyd Dowler ^{#}	Flanker	Colorado
5	7	55	Andy Cvercko	Guard	Northwestern
6	1	61	Willie Taylor	Center	Florida A&M
7	1	73	Bobby Jackson	Defensive back	Alabama
7	11	83	Gary Raid	Tackle	Willamette
8	1	85	Buddy Mayfield	End	South Carolina
8	11	95	Bob Laraba	Linebacker	UTEP
9	1	97	George Dixon	Back	Bridgeport
10	1	109	Sam Tuccio	Tackle	Southern Miss
11	1	121	Bob Webb	Back	St. Ambrose
12	1	133	Larry Hall	Guard	Missouri Valley
13	1	145	Jim Hurd	Back	Albion
14	1	157	Ken Kerr	Guard	Arizona St.
15	1	169	Dick Teteak	Guard	Wisconsin
16	1	181	Dan Edgington	End	Florida
17	1	193	Tom Secules	Back	William & Mary
18	1	205	Dick Nearents	Tackle	Eastern Washington
19	1	217	Bill Butler	Defensive back	Chattanooga
20	1	229	Charley Sample	Back	Arkansas
21	1	241	Dave Smith	Fullback	Ripon
22	1	253	Charlie Anderson	End	Drake
23	1	265	Ben Lawver	Tackle	Lewis & Clark
24	1	277	Joe Hergert	Linebacker	Florida
25	1	289	Leroy Hardee	Back	Florida A&M
26	1	301	Ken Higginbotham	End	—
27	1	313	Timmy Brown	Running back	Ball St.
28	1	325	Jerry Epps	Guard	West Texas St.
29	1	337	Jack Flara	Back	Pittsburgh
30	1	349	Dick Emerich	Tackle	West Chester

== 1960 draft ==
Green Bay Packers draft selections in 1960Source: Pro-Football-Reference.com
Round	Pick #	Overall	Name	Position	College
1	5	5	Tom Moore	Halfback	Vanderbilt
2	5	17	Bob Jeter ^{#}	Defensive back	Iowa
5	3	51	Dale Hackbart	Defensive back	Wisconsin
6	5	65	Mike Wright	Tackle	Minnesota
7	5	77	Kirk Phares	Guard	South Carolina
8	5	89	Don Hitt	Center	Oklahoma St.
9	5	101	Frank Brixius	Tackle	Minnesota
11	5	125	Ron Ray	Tackle	Howard Payne
12	5	137	Harry Ball	Tackle	Boston College
13	5	149	Paul Winslow	Defensive back	North Carolina Central
14	5	161	Jon Gilliam	Center	Texas A&M–Commerce
15	5	173	Garney Henley	Back	Huron
16	5	185	John Littlejohn	Back	Kansas St.
17	5	197	Joe Gomes	Back	South Carolina
18	5	209	Royce Whittington	Tackle	Southwestern Louisiana
19	5	221	Rich Brooks	End	Purdue
20	5	233	Gilmer Lewis	Tackle	Oklahoma

== 1961 draft ==
Green Bay Packers draft selections in 1961Source: Pro-Football-Reference.com
Round	Pick #	Overall	Name	Position	College
1	12	12	Herb Adderley ‡	Defensive back	Michigan St.
2	12	26	Ron Kostelnik ^{#}	Defensive tackle	Cincinnati
3	12	40	Phil Nugent	Defensive back	Tulane
4	12	54	Paul Dudley	Halfback	Arkansas
4	14	56	Joe LeSage	Guard	Tulane
5	12	68	Jack Novak	Guard	Miami (FL)
6	12	82	Lee Folkins	Tight end	Washington
7	12	96	Lewis Johnson	Back	Florida A&M
9	12	124	Vester Flanagan	Tackle	Humboldt St.
10	2	128	Roger Hagberg	Fullback	Minnesota
10	12	138	Buck McLeod	Tackle	Baylor
11	12	152	Val Keckin	Quarterback	Southern Miss
12	12	166	John Denvir	Guard	Colorado
13	12	180	Elijah Pitts ^{#}	Halfback	Philander Smith
14	12	194	Nelson Toburen	Linebacker	Wichita St.
15	12	208	Ray Lardani	Tackle	Miami (FL)
16	12	222	Clarence Mason	End	Bowling Green
17	12	236	Jim Brewington	Tackle	North Carolina Central
18	12	250	Arthur Sims	Back	Texas A&M
19	12	264	Leland Bondhus	Tackle	South Dakota St.
20	12	278	Ray Ratkowski	Halfback	Notre Dame

== 1962 draft ==
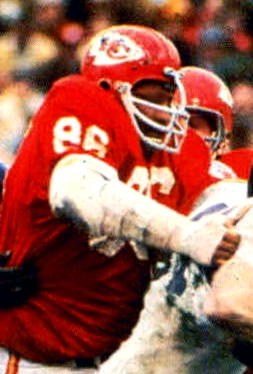
Buck Buchanan, shown here playing for the Kansas City Chiefs, was the Packers' seventeenth-round selection in the 1962 draft.

Green Bay Packers draft selections in 1962Source: Pro-Football-Reference.com
Round	Pick #	Overall	Name	Position	College
1	14	14	Earl Gros	Fullback	LSU
2	14	28	Ed Blaine	Guard	Missouri
3	13	41	Gary Barnes	Wide receiver	Clemson
4	14	56	Ron Gassert	Defensive tackle	Virginia
5	9	65	Chuck Morris	Back	Ole Miss
5	14	70	Jon Schopf	Guard	Michigan
6	9	79	John Sutro	Offensive tackle	San Jose St.
6	14	84	Oscar Donahue	Wide receiver	San Jose St.
7	14	98	Gary Cutsinger	Defensive end	Oklahoma St.
8	14	112	Jim Tullis	Back	Florida A&M
9	14	126	Peter Schenk	Back	Washington St.
10	14	140	Gale Weidner	Quarterback	Colorado
11	14	154	Jim Thrush	Tackle	—
12	4	158	Joe Thorne	Back	South Dakota St.
12	14	168	Tom Pennington	Placekicker	Georgia
13	14	182	Tom Kepner	Tackle	Villanova
14	14	196	Ernie Green	Halfback	Louisville
15	14	210	Roger Holdinsky	Back	West Virginia
16	14	224	Jimmy Field	Back	LSU
17	14	238	Buck Buchanan †	Tackle	Grambling St.
18	14	252	Bob Joiner	Quarterback	Presbyterian
19	14	266	Jerry Scattini	Back	California
20	14	280	Mike Snodgrass	Center	Western Michigan

== 1963 draft ==
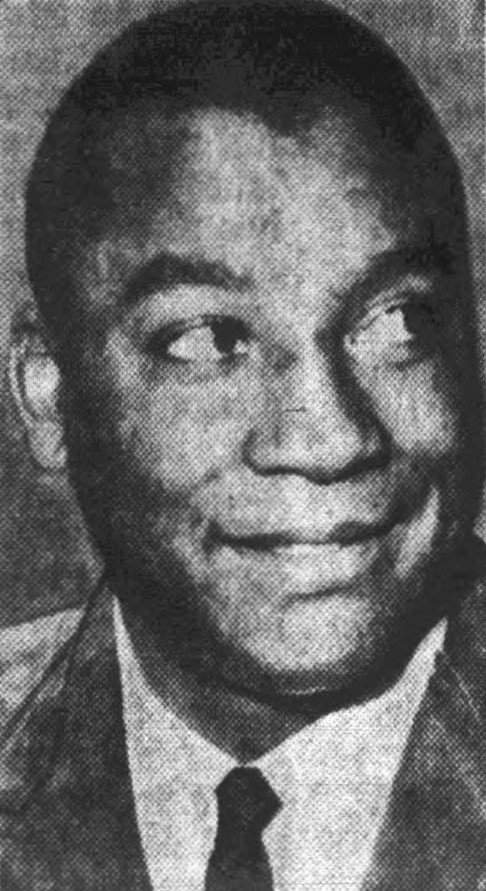
Lionel Aldridge was the Packers' fourth-round selection in the 1963 draft.

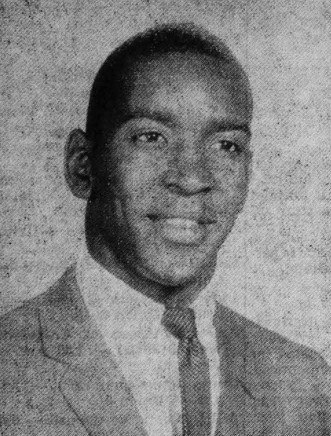
Marv Fleming was the Packers' eleventh-round selection in the 1963 draft.

Green Bay Packers draft selections in 1963Source: Pro-Football-Reference.com
Round	Pick #	Overall	Name	Position	College
1	14	14	Dave Robinson ‡	Linebacker	Penn St.
2	14	28	Tom Brown	Defensive back	Maryland
3	11	39	Dennis Claridge	Quarterback	Nebraska
3	14	42	Tony Liscio	Tackle	Tulsa
4	12	54	Lionel Aldridge ^{#}	Defensive end	Utah St.
4	14	56	Carlton Simons	Center	Stanford
5	7	63	Jack Cvercko	Guard	Northwestern
5	14	70	Dan Grimm	Guard	Colorado
6	6	76	John Simmons	End	Tulsa
6	14	84	Jan Barrett	End	Fresno St.
7	9	93	Gary Kroner	Defensive back	Wisconsin
7	11	95	Olin Hill	Tackle	Furman
7	14	98	Turnley Todd	Linebacker	Virginia
8	6	104	Keith Kinderman	Fullback	Florida St.
8	14	112	Louis Rettino	Back	Villanova
9	14	126	Bill Freeman	Tackle	Southern Miss
10	14	140	Earl McQuiston	Guard	Iowa
11	14	154	Marv Fleming ^{#}	Tight end	Utah
12	14	168	Daryle Lamonica	Quarterback	Notre Dame
13	14	182	Bill Kellum	Tackle	Tulane
14	14	196	James Holler	Linebacker	South Carolina
15	14	210	Gene Breen	Linebacker	Virginia Tech
16	14	224	Coolidge Hunt	Back	Texas Tech
17	14	238	Thurman Walker	End	Illinois
18	14	252	Luis Hernandez	Guard	UTEP
19	14	266	Herman Hamp	Back	Fresno St.
20	14	280	Bobby Brezina	Halfback	Houston

== 1964 draft ==
Bill Curry was the Packers' last selection in the 1964 draft.

Green Bay Packers draft selections in 1964Source: Pro-Football-Reference.com
Round	Pick #	Overall	Name	Position	College
1	13	13	Lloyd Voss	Defensive end	Nebraska
2	13	27	Jon Morris	Center	Holy Cross
3	8	36	Ode Burrell	Running back	Mississippi St.
3	12	40	Joe O'Donnell	Guard	Michigan
3	13	41	Tommy Crutcher	Linebacker	TCU
4	2	44	Bob Long	Flanker	Wichita St.
4	13	55	Paul Costa	Tight end	Notre Dame
5	4	60	Duke Carlisle	Back	Texas
5	13	69	Steve Wright	Tackle	Alabama
7	13	97	Dick Herzing	Tackle	Drake
8	13	111	Ken Bowman ^{#}	Center	Wisconsin
9	13	125	John McDowell	Tackle	St. John's (MN)
10	13	139	Allen Jacobs	Fullback	Utah
11	13	153	Jack Petersen	Tackle	Nebraska-Omaha
12	13	167	Dwain Bean	Back	North Texas
13	13	181	Jack Mauro	Tackle	Northern Michigan
14	13	195	Tom O'Grady	End	Northwestern
15	13	209	Alex Zerko	Tackle	Kent St.
16	13	223	Andrew Ireland	Back	Utah
17	13	237	Len St. Jean	Guard	Northern Michigan
18	13	251	Mike Hicks	Guard	Marshall
19	13	265	John Baker	Defensive end	Norfolk St.
20	13	279	Bill Curry	Center	Georgia Tech

== 1965 draft ==
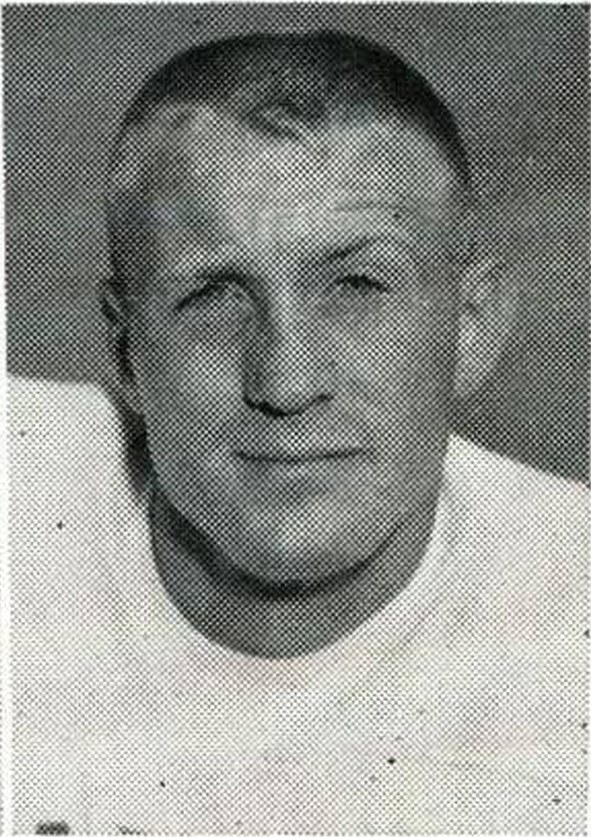
Larry Elkins was the Packers' second selection in the first round, going 10th overall, of the 1965 draft.

Green Bay Packers draft selections in 1965Source: Pro-Football-Reference.com
Round	Pick #	Overall	Name	Position	College
1	7	7	Donny Anderson ^{#}	Running back	Texas Tech
1	10	10	Larry Elkins	Wide receiver	Baylor
2	10	24	Alphonse Dotson	Defensive tackle	Grambling St.
3	10	38	Allen Brown	Tight end	Ole Miss
4	10	52	Wally Mahle	Back	Syracuse
5	3	59	Jim Harvey	Guard	Ole Miss
5	10	66	Doug Goodwin	Running back	Maryland-Eastern Shore
6	4	74	Rich Koeper	Tackle	Oregon St.
6	10	80	Bill Symons	Halfback	Colorado
7	1	85	Jerry Roberts	Back	Baldwin Wallace
7	2	86	Roger Jacobazzi	Tackle	Wisconsin
7	10	94	Junior Coffey	Running back	Washington
8	10	108	Mike Shinn	End	Kansas
9	10	122	Larry Bulaich	Back	TCU
10	10	136	Bud Marshall	Defensive tackle	Stephen F. Austin
11	10	150	Jim Weatherwax	Defensive tackle	Cal State Los Angeles
12	10	164	Gene Jeter	Linebacker	Texas Southern
13	10	178	Roy Schmidt	Guard	Long Beach St.
14	10	192	John Putnam	Fullback	Drake
15	10	206	Chuck Hurston	Defensive end	Auburn
16	10	220	Phil Vandersea	Linebacker	Massachusetts
17	10	234	Steve Clark	Placekicker	Oregon St.
18	10	248	Jeff White	End	Texas Tech
19	10	262	Len Sears	Tackle	South Carolina
20	10	276	Jim Chandler	Fullback	Benedictine

== 1966 draft ==
Green Bay Packers draft selections in 1966Source: Pro-Football-Reference.com
Round	Pick #	Overall	Name	Position	College
1	9	9	Jim Grabowski	Running back	Illinois
1	13	13	Gale Gillingham ^{#}	Guard	Minnesota
2	14	30	Tom Cichowski	Tackle	Maryland
3	13	45	Fred Heron	Defensive tackle	San Jose St.
3	14	46	Tony Jeter	Tight end	Nebraska
4	14	62	John Roderick	Wide receiver	SMU
7	13	108	Ray Miller	Defensive end	Idaho
8	14	124	Ken McLean	Flanker	Texas A&M
9	13	138	Ron Rector	Running back	Northwestern
10	14	154	Sam Montgomery	Defensive end	Southern
11	13	168	Ralph Wenzel	Guard	San Diego St.
12	14	184	Jim Mankins	Running back	Florida St.
13	13	198	Ed King	Linebacker	USC
14	14	214	Ron Hanson	Flanker	North Dakota St.
15	13	228	Grady Bolton	Tackle	Mississippi St.
16	14	244	Bob Schultz	Defensive end	Wisconsin–Stevens Point
17	13	258	David Hathcock	Defensive back	Memphis St.
18	14	274	Jim Jones	Defensive end	Nebraska-Omaha
19	13	288	Dave Moton	End	USC
20	14	304	Ed Maras	End	South Dakota St.

== 1967 draft ==
Green Bay Packers draft selections in 1967Source: Pro-Football-Reference.com
Round	Pick #	Overall	Name	Position	College
1	9	9	Bob Hyland	Center	Boston College
1	25	25	Don Horn	Quarterback	San Diego St.
2	15	41	Dave Dunaway	Wide receiver	Duke
2	25	51	Jim Flanigan	Linebacker	Pittsburgh
3	25	78	John Rowser	Defensive back	Michigan
4	13	93	Travis Williams ^{#}	Running back	Arizona St.
5	9	116	Dwight Hood	Defensive tackle	Baylor
5	23	130	Richard Tate	Defensive back	Utah
5	25	132	Jay Bachman	Center	Cincinnati
6	25	158	Steward Williams	Fullback	Bowling Green
7	2	161	Bob Ziolkowski	Tackle	Iowa
7	25	184	Bill Powell	Linebacker	Missouri
8	25	210	Clarence Miles	Defensive tackle	—
9	25	236	Harlan Reed	Tight end	Mississippi St.
10	25	262	Bill Shear	Placekicker	Cortland St.
11	24	287	Dave Bennett	Quarterback	Springfield
12	24	314	Mike Bass	Defensive back	Michigan
13	25	340	Keith Brown	Flanker	Central Missouri St.
14	25	366	Claudis James	Wide receiver	Jackson St.
15	25	392	Jim Schneider	Defensive tackle	Colgate
16	25	418	Fred Cassidy	Halfback	Miami (FL)
17	25	444	Jeff Elias	Tight end	Kansas

== 1968 draft ==
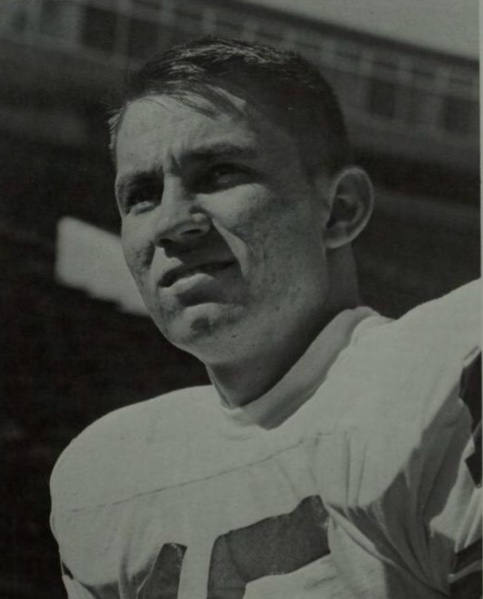
Billy Stevens was the Packers' third-round selection in the 1968 draft.

Green Bay Packers draft selections in 1968Source: Pro-Football-Reference.com
Round	Pick #	Overall	Name	Position	College
1	5	5	Fred Carr ^{#}	Linebacker	UTEP
1	26	26	Bill Lueck	Guard	Arizona
3	12	67	Billy Stevens	Quarterback	UTEP
3	26	81	Dick Himes	Offensive tackle	Ohio St.
4	9	92	Brendan McCarthy	Running back	Boston College
4	25	108	John Robinson	Flanker	Tennessee St.
5	10	121	Steve Duich	Guard	San Diego St.
5	26	137	Francis Winkler	Defensive end	Memphis
6	26	164	Walter Chadwick	Running back	Tennessee
7	26	191	Andy Beath	Defensive back	Duke
8	26	218	Tom Owens	Guard	Missouri S&T
9	26	245	Bob Apisa	Running back	Michigan St.
10	14	260	Rick Cash	Defensive end	Truman St.
10	26	272	Ron Worthen	Center	Arkansas St.
11	26	299	Gordon Rule	Defensive back	Dartmouth
12	25	325	Dennis Porter	Tackle	Northern Michigan
13	26	353	Frank Geiselman	Flanker	Rhode Island
14	26	380	John Farler	End	Colorado
15	26	407	Ridley Gibson	Defensive back	Baylor
16	26	434	Al Groves	Tackle	St. Norbert
17	26	461	Ken Rota	Running back	North Dakota St.

== 1969 draft ==
Green Bay Packers draft selections in 1969Source: Pro-Football-Reference.com
Round	Pick #	Overall	Name	Position	College
1	12	12	Rich Moore	Defensive tackle	Villanova
2	12	38	Dave Bradley	Guard	Penn St.
3	12	64	John Spilis	Wide receiver	Northern Illinois
4	12	90	Perry Williams	Running back	Purdue
5	12	116	Bill Hayhoe	Tackle	USC
6	4	134	Ron Jones	Tight end	UTEP
6	12	142	Ken Vinyard	Placekicker	Texas Tech
7	12	168	Larry Agajanian	Defensive tackle	UCLA
8	12	194	Doug Gosnell	Center	Utah St.
9	12	220	David Hampton	Running back	Wyoming
10	12	246	Bruce Nelson	Tackle	North Dakota St.
11	12	272	Leon Harden	Defensive back	UTEP
12	12	298	Tom Buckman	Tight end	Texas A&M
13	7	324	Craig Koinzan	Linebacker	Doane
14	12	350	Rich Voltzke	Running back	Minnesota
15	12	376	Dan Eckstein	Defensive back	Presbyterian
16	12	402	Dick Hewins	Flanker	Drake
17	12	428	John Mack	Running back	Central Missouri St.

== See also ==
- Lists of Green Bay Packers players
