= Green Bay Packers draft history =

The Green Bay Packers are a professional American football team based in Green Bay, Wisconsin. The Packers have competed in the National Football League (NFL) since 1921, two years after their original founding by Curly Lambeau and George Whitney Calhoun. They are members of the North Division of the National Football Conference (NFC) and play their home games at Lambeau Field in central Wisconsin. In 1936, the Packers took part in the first NFL draft of college football players and have participated in every NFL draft since. With the seventh pick of the first round of the 1936 draft, Russ Letlow, a guard out of the University of San Francisco, became the Packers' first draft selection.

From 1936 to 1959, the NFL draft was the only selection process to retain the rights to sign college football players, except for that of the drafts of the short-lived All-America Football Conference (AAFC) in the late 1940s. However, starting in 1960, the newly-formed American Football League (AFL) began a competing draft of the same group of collegiate players. The NFL and AFL competed for the same players from 1960 to 1966, creating a bidding war for signing draft picks and players that threatened the financial sustainability of each league. In 1967, the AFL and NFL announced a merger that would be finalized in 1970. During this time, both leagues implemented a common draft, thus avoiding competition for signing draftees. In addition to the annual draft, special drafts have occurred. These included the 1950 AAFC dispersal draft and the 1984 NFL supplemental draft, where existing NFL teams, including the Packers, were able to select players from other leagues. The AAFC dispersal draft was organized after the AAFC merged with the NFL; three teams from the AAFC were admitted into the NFL, while most of the remaining players from the other five AAFC teams were placed in the dispersal draft. The 1984 supplemental draft occurred after the formation of the United States Football League (USFL) with the primary purpose of selecting players that had already signed with a USFL team in a separate process from the annual draft. The Canadian Football League (CFL) was also included in this supplemental draft. In addition to the 1984 supplemental draft, the NFL has hosted an annual supplemental draft since 1977 for players who had circumstances affect their eligibility for the NFL draft. The Packers have only selected a player once in a supplemental draft, taking Mike Wahle in the second round in 1998. With this selection, the Packers forfeited their normal second round pick in the next draft. Additionally, eight expansion drafts occurred, with the most recent in 2002, where newly formed NFL teams were allowed to draft players from existing NFL teams within certain limitations.

Throughout the history of the NFL draft, the number of rounds and the number of picks have fluctuated significantly, depending on the number of teams in the NFL. Thus with 32 teams in the NFL since 2002, there have been 32 standard draft picks per round. The number of rounds peaked to 30 in the years during and after World War II, although that number has been routinely reduced down to the current seven rounds per draft. The order of the draft selection is derived from the previous season's final standings, with the worst team in the league selecting first and the champion selecting last. However, for 12 years from 1947 to 1958, the first overall pick was chosen by a lottery, with that selection replacing what would have been the team's original first-round selection based on their record the previous season. When a team won the lottery, they were then removed from the next year's lottery. The Packers won the last of these lotteries in the 1957 NFL draft, using their bonus pick to select future Pro Football Hall of Famer Paul Hornung.

Including Hornung, the Packers have selected 13 players who ended up in the Pro Football Hall of Fame. Under the oversight of scout Jack Vainisi, 10 of these players were selected over a 7-year period from 1952 to 1958, culminating in the 1958 NFL draft where the Packers selected future All-Pro Dan Currie and future Pro Football Hall of Famers Jim Taylor, Ray Nitschke and Jerry Kramer successively in the first four rounds. This draft has been identified as one of the most successful in the history of the NFL. Vainisi's guidance also led to the Packers drafting quarterback Bart Starr in the 17th round of the 1956 NFL draft; Starr would go on to lead the Packers to five NFL Championships and became one of the lowest drafted players to be inducted into the Pro Football Hall of Fame. On three separate occasions, Packers draft picks have won the Associated Press NFL Rookie of the Year Award: John Brockington (1971), Willie Buchanon (1972) and Eddie Lacy (2013). The Packers have had the first selection in a draft twice, in 1957 with Hornung and two years later in 1959, when they selected quarterback Randy Duncan. Duncan signed with the CFL and never played for the Packers. They have also only had the second pick twice: Mike McCoy in 1970 and Tony Mandarich in 1989. The selection of Mandarich has been much maligned over the years. Of the first five picks of the 1989 NFL draft, Mandarich was the only one to not be elected to the Pro Football Hall of Fame. Barry Sanders, Derrick Thomas and Deion Sanders, who were all available to the Packers with the second pick, were chosen after Mandarich with picks three, four and five. The Packers participated in the most recent draft in 2026, selecting 6 players over 7 rounds.

== Draft history by year ==
Green Bay Packers draft history by year
Draft	Rounds	Original draft order (Note: Draft orders change based on trades and other factors. This is the original draft order based on the previous season's record.)	Total selections	First-round pick(s)	Refs
1936	9	7th	9	Russ Letlow	
1937	10	9th	10	Eddie Jankowski	
1938	12	7th	12	Cecil Isbell	
1939	22	9th	19	Larry Buhler	
1940	22	9th	20	Hal Van Every	
1941	20	7th	20	George Paskvan	
1942	22	9th	20	Urban Odson	
1943	32	8th	30	Dick Wildung	
1944	32	7th	30	Merv Pregulman	
1945	32	11th	30	Walt Schlinkman	
1946	32	6th	30	Johnny Strzykalski	
1947	32	6th	30	Ernie Case	
1948	32	7th	29	Jug Girard	
1949	25	5th	23	Stan Heath	
1950 dispersal	10	3rd	15	Billy Grimes	
1950	30	4th	29	Clayton Tonnemaker	
1951	30	5th	28	Bob Gain	
1952	30	4th	30	Babe Parilli	
1953	30	7th	30	Al Carmichael	
1954	30	3rd	29	Art Hunter	
1954	30	3rd	29	Veryl Switzer	
1955	30	5th	30	Tom Bettis	
1956	30	8th	29	Jack Losch	
1957	30	4th	30	Paul Hornung	
1957	30	4th	30	Ron Kramer	
1958	30	3rd	30	Dan Currie	
1959	30	1st	31	Randy Duncan	
1960	20	5th	17	Tom Moore	
1961	20	12th	21	Herb Adderley	
1962	20	14th	22	Earl Gros	
1963	20	14th	27	Dave Robinson	
1964	20	13th	23	Lloyd Voss	
1965	20	10th	25	Donny Anderson	
1965	20	10th	25	Larry Elkins	
1966	20	9th	20	Jim Grabowski	
1966	20	9th	20	Gale Gillingham	
1967	17	25th	22	Bob Hyland	
1967	17	25th	22	Don Horn	
1968	17	5th	21	Fred Carr	
1968	17	5th	21	Bill Lueck	
1969	17	12th	18	Rich Moore	
1970	17	16th	20	Mike McCoy	
1970	17	16th	20	Rich McGeorge	
1971	17	12th	18	John Brockington	
1972	17	7th	16	Willie Buchanon	
1972	17	7th	16	Jerry Tagge	
1973	17	21st	14	Barry Smith	
1974	17	12th	16	Barty Smith	
1975	17	10th	13	No pick	
1976	17	9th	14	Mark Koncar	
1977	12	9th	12	Mike Butler	
1977	12	9th	12	Ezra Johnson	
1978	12	6th	14	James Lofton	
1978	12	6th	14	John Anderson	
1979	12	15th	12	Eddie Lee Ivery	
1980	12	4th	12	Bruce Clark	
1980	12	4th	12	George Cumby	
1981	12	6th	11	Rich Campbell	
1982	12	16th	11	Ron Hallstrom	
1983	12	20th	12	Tim Lewis	
1984	12	12th	12	Alphonso Carreker	
1984 supplemental	3	12th	3	Buford Jordan	
1985	12	14th	12	Ken Ruettgers	
1986	12	14th	10	No pick	
1987	12	4th	14	Brent Fullwood	
1988	12	7th	12	Sterling Sharpe	
1989	12	2nd	14	Tony Mandarich	
1990	12	19th	13	Tony Bennett	
1990	12	19th	13	Darrell Thompson	
1991	12	8th	14	Vinnie Clark	
1992	12	5th	13	Terrell Buckley	
1993	8	15th	9	Wayne Simmons	
1993	8	15th	9	George Teague	
1994	7	20th	9	Aaron Taylor	
1995	7	2nd	10	Craig Newsome	
1996	7	27th	8	John Michels	
1997	7	30th	8	Ross Verba	
1998	7	29th	8 (Note: This total count includes seven selections in the NFL draft and one supplemental pick made prior to the draft.)	Vonnie Holliday	
1999	7	25th	12	Antuan Edwards	
2000	7	14th	13	Bubba Franks	
2001	7	17th	6	Jamal Reynolds	
2002	7	28th	6	Javon Walker	
2003	7	29th	9	Nick Barnett	
2004	7	25th	6	Ahmad Carroll	
2005	7	24th	11	Aaron Rodgers	
2006	7	5th	12	A. J. Hawk	
2007	7	16th	11	Justin Harrell	
2008	7	30th	9	No pick	
2009	7	9th	8	B. J. Raji	
2009	7	9th	8	Clay Matthews III	
2010	7	23rd	7	Bryan Bulaga	
2011	7	32nd	10	Derek Sherrod	
2012	7	28th	8	Nick Perry	
2013	7	26th	11	Datone Jones	
2014	7	21st	10	Ha Ha Clinton-Dix	
2015	7	30th	8	Damarious Randall	
2016	7	27th	7	Kenny Clark	
2017	7	29th	10	No pick	
2018	7	14th	11	Jaire Alexander	
2019	7	12th	8	Rashan Gary	
2019	7	12th	8	Darnell Savage	
2020	7	30th	9	Jordan Love	
2021	7	29th	9	Eric Stokes	
2022	7	28th	11	Quay Walker	
2022	7	28th	11	Devonte Wyatt	
2023	7	15th	13	Lukas Van Ness	
2024	7	25th	11	Jordan Morgan	
2025	7	23rd	8	Matthew Golden	
2026	7	20th	6	No pick	

== See also ==
- Lists of Green Bay Packers players
