= Butch Nash =

American football coach and player (1915–2005)

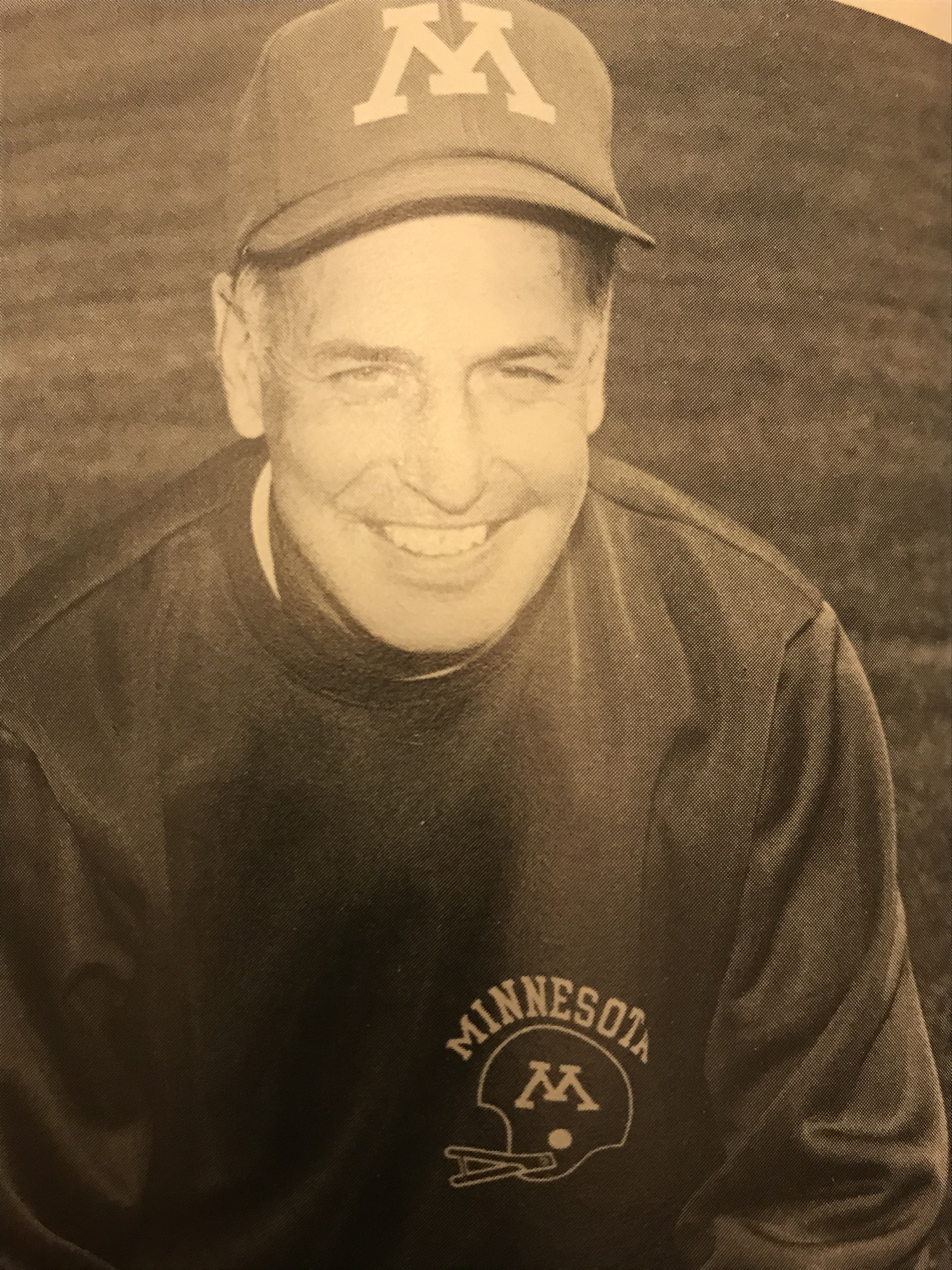
Butch Nash

George "Butch" Addison Nash (December 13, 1915 – July 18, 2005) was an American football collegiate player and coach for the Minnesota Golden Gophers in Minneapolis, Minnesota. He played for the Golden Gophers from 1935 to 1938. During that time, he played the end position. Nash earned second-team Associated Press All-Big Ten Conference honors for his efforts in his senior 1938 season. He was later an assistant coach for the Golden Gophers from 1947 through 1980 (43 seasons) as primarily a defensive ends specialist. He then returned in 1984 as the junior varsity coach. He then worked as a volunteer coach from 1985 to 1991. He fully retired from coaching after the 1991 season. During his career, he worked under seven head coaches: Bernie Bierman, Wes Fesler, Murray Warmath, Cal Stoll, Joe Salem, Lou Holtz, and John Gutekunst.

Nash's career is highlighted by several key moments including National Football Championships in 1935 and 1936 as a player. As a coach, he earned a National Championship in 1960, a Rose Bowl victory in 1962, and bowl participation in the 1961 Rose Bowl and 1977 Hall of Fame Bowl

Another key highlight is the role he played in the 1977 and 1986 victories over the Michigan Wolverines. He delivered pre-game speeches to the team telling them the importance of the rivalry and the history of the "Little Brown Jug."

Nash also played basketball for the Golden Gophers and was on the 1936–1937 Big Ten Championship team.

== Awards and championships ==
Role	Year	Award or Championship
End	1935	National Champions
End	1935	Big Ten Champions
End	1936	National Champions
End	1937	Big Ten Champions
Guard	1937	Big Ten Champions (Basketball)
End	1938	Big Ten Champions
End	1938	Associated Press All Big Ten Team
Head Coach	1941	Big Nine Champion (Winona, Minn High School)
Asst. Coach	1960	National Champions
Asst. Coach	1960	Big Ten Champions
Asst. Coach	1962	Rose Bowl Champions

== Personal life ==
Nash was married to Mary Leona "Lee" Nash and had three children.

== Early life ==
Nash was born in Northeast Minneapolis, Minnesota on December 13, 1915. He attended Edison High School in Minneapolis and was a standout athlete in Basketball and Football.

He died July 18, 2005, at the age of 89.

== George "Butch" Nash Scholarship ==
The George "Butch" Nash Scholarship is awarded each year to a Golden Gopher Football Player. The Butch Nash Scholarship is considered a Legacy Level Endowment and is a part of the Golden Gopher Fund. The recipients for the 2025-26 season are: Jay'Quan Stubbs, Defensive Lineman, Cleveland Heights, OH and Lamont Hamilton, Defensive Back, Racine, WI.

== The Butch Nash Player Award ==
Since 1984, the Golden Gopher football team awards the Butch Nash award to player(s) that are "competitive on the field and in the classroom." The recipient list is below.

Year	Player	Position
1984	John Kelly	C
1985	Andy Hare	FL
1986	Anthony Burke	OT
1987	Brian Bonner	OLB
1988	Ross Ukkelberg	DT
1989	Dan Liimatta	OT
1990	Frank Jackson	CB
1991	Joel Staats	LB
1992	Russ Heath	LB
1993	Omar Douglas	WR
1994	Justin Conzemius	DB
1995	Justin Conzemius	LB
1996	Cory Sauter	QB
1997	Parc Williams	LB
1998	Parc Williams	LB
1999	Ben Mezera	LB
2000	Ben Hamilton	C
2001	Derek Burns	OG
2002	Dan Kwapinski	DT
2003	Greg Eslinger	C
2004	Mark Setterstrom	OG
2005	Greg Eslinger	C
2006	Dominic Jones	CB
2007	John Shevlin	LB / S
2007	Steve Shidell	OT
2008	Jeff Tow-Arnett	OL
2009	Jon Hoese	FB
2009	Steve Shidell	OT
2010	Ryan Collado	CB / D
2010	D.J. Burris	C
2011	Aaron Hill	LB
2012	Aaron Hill	LB
2013	Jon Christenson	C
2014	Jon Christenson	C
2015	Jon Christenson	OG
2016	Scott Ekpe	DT
2017	Brandon Lingen	TE
2017	Andrew Stelter	DL
2018	Payton Jordahl	DL
2018	Gary Moore	DL
2018	Sam Renner	DL
2019	Sam Renner	DL
2019	Blaise Andries	OL

== The Butch Nash High School Assistant Coach Award ==
The Butch Nash High School Assistant Coach Award given to outstanding Minnesota high school football coaches based on the criteria that they are an active coach, could be coaching at the varsity or lower levels, have a sufficient years of service to their program, along with other criteria mentioned on the Minnesota Football Coaches web site.

You can see a full list of past award recipients at the Minnesota Football Coaches Association web site
