= 1938 All-Big Ten Conference football team =

American college football all-star team

The 1938 All-Big Ten Conference football team consists of American football players selected to the All-Big Ten Conference teams selected by the Associated Press (AP) and United Press (UP) for the 1938 Big Ten Conference football season.

== All Big-Ten selections ==
=== Ends ===
- Cleo Diehl, Northwestern (AP-1, UP-1)
- Erwin Prasse, Iowa (AP-1)
- Frank Petrick, Indiana (UP-1)
- Butch Nash, Minnesota (AP-2)
- John Mariucci, Minnesota (AP-2)

=== Tackles ===
- Joe Mihal, Purdue (AP-1, UP-1)
- Bob Voigts, Northwestern (AP-2, UP-1)
- Bob Haak, Indiana (AP-1)
- Alex Schoenbaum, Ohio State (AP-2)

=== Guards ===
- Ralph Heikkinen, Michigan (AP-1, UP-1)
- Frank Twedell, Minnesota (AP-1)
- Lynn Hovland, Wisconsin (AP-2)
- Hal Method, Northwestern (AP-2)

=== Centers ===
- Jack Murray, Wisconsin (AP-1, UP-1)
- Jack Haman, Northwestern (AP-2)

=== Quarterbacks ===
- Forest Evashevski, Michigan (AP-1)
- Wilbur Moore, Minnesota (AP-2 [halfback], UP-1)
- Vince Gavre, Wisconsin (AP-2)

=== Halfbacks ===
- Lou Brock, Purdue (AP-1, UP-1)
- Tom Harmon, Michigan (AP-1, UP-1)
- Roy Bellin, Wisconsin (AP-2)

=== Fullbacks ===
- Howard Weiss, Wisconsin (AP-1, UP-1)
- Larry Buhler, Minnesota (AP-2)

== Key ==
AP = Associated Press, chosen by conference coaches

UP = United Press, based on a poll of Big Ten coaches, campus observers, and sports writers

Bold = Consensus first-team selection of both the AP and UP

== See also ==
- 1938 College Football All-America Team
