= Ed Withers =

American football player (1926–1975)

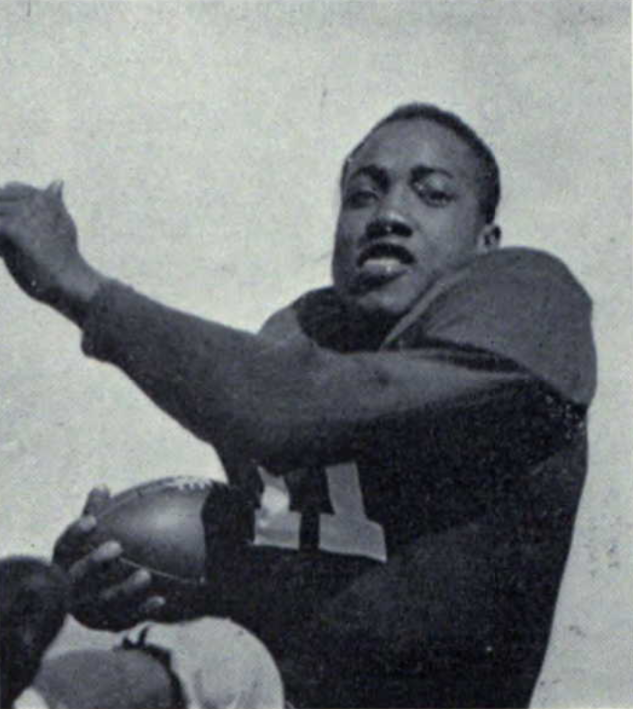
- Withers from 1951 Badger

Profile
- Position: Defensive back

Personal information
- Born: August 28, 1926; Memphis, Tennessee, U.S.
- Died: April 17, 1975 (age 48); Tomah, Wisconsin, U.S.

Career information
- High school: Madison (WI) Central
- College: Wisconsin

Awards and highlights
- First-team All-American (1950)

Edward J. Withers (August 28, 1926 – April 17, 1975) was an American football player. He was born in Memphis, Tennessee, and moved to Madison, Wisconsin when he was a boy. He attended the University of Wisconsin-Madison and played college football for the Wisconsin Badgers football team. He was one of the first African-Americans to be a regular starter for the Badgers, playing at the defensive back position. He was selected by the Football Writers Association of America as a first-team defensive player on their 1950 College Football All-America Team. Withers later worked as a teacher and coach at Roosevelt and North Division High Schools in Milwaukee and subsequently as an insurance salesman. He died in Tomah, Wisconsin, in 1975 at age 48.
