= Ken McLean (American football) =

Former American football wide receiver

No. 36
- Position: Wide receiver

Personal information
- Born: April 20, 1943
- Died: February 9, 2009 (aged 65)
- Listed height: 5 ft 11 in (1.80 m)
- Listed weight: 188 lb (85 kg)

Career information
- College: Texas A&M (1961–1963, 1965)

Career history
- Buffalo Bills (1966)*; New Orleans Saints (1967)*
- * Offseason or practice squad member only

Ken "Dude" McLean (April 20, 1943 - February 9, 2009) was an American football wide receiver. He played college football for the Texas A&M Aggies from 1961 to 1963 and 1965. He did not play in 1964 due to not meeting academic requirements. In 1965, he led the Southwest Conference with 60 receptions for 835 yards. His 60 receptions ranked sixth nationally, and his 835 receiving yards ranked seventh nationally. In a 1965 game against Texas, McLean broke the Southwest Conference single-game record with 250 receiving yards and also set a conference record with a 91-yard reception.

McLean was selected by the Green Bay Packers in the eighth round (124th overall) of the 1966 NFL draft and by the Buffalo Bills in the 20th round (181st overall) of the 1966 AFL draft. He signed with the Bills, played in three preseason games, but was released at the end of August. He tried out with the Packers but returned to the Bills as a member of the taxi squad. He later sued the Bills for back-pay and was awarded $8,360 in a decision that went before the Texas Supreme Court in 1968.

McLean later became a criminal defense attorney. He died in February 2009 at age 65.
