= Jim Morse =

American football player (1935–2023)

Profile
- Position: Right halfback

Personal information
- Born: October 8, 1935; Muskegon, Michigan, U.S.
- Died: September 28, 2023 (age 87); Muskegon, Michigan, U.S.
- Listed height: 6 ft 0 in (1.83 m)
- Listed weight: 185 lb (84 kg)

Career information
- High school: St. Mary's (Muskegon, MI)
- College: Notre Dame (1954–1956)

Career history
- Calgary Stampeders (1957–1958); Houston Oilers (1960)*
- * Offseason or practice squad member only

James Allen Morse (October 8, 1935 – September 28, 2023) was an American football halfback. He played for the Notre Dame Fighting Irish from 1954 to 1956. He led Notre Dame in receiving in 1955 and 1956.

Morse grew up in Muskegon, Michigan, and was a triple-threat fullback at St. Mary's High School. He also played baseball and basketball at St. Mary's.

In March 1953, Morse accepted a scholarship to Notre Dame University. As a sophomore in 1954, he tallied 345 rushing yards on 58 carries (5.1-yard average) and caught 15 passes for 236 yards. On November 27, he gained 179 yards from scrimmage in a victory over USC.

As a junior in 1955, he missed the first two games due to injury, but still tallied 400 rushing yards on 92 carries (4.3-yard average) and caught 17 passes for 424 yards (24.9-yard average). At the end of the 1955 season, his teammates elected him as captain of the 1956 team.

As a senior in 1956, he ranked among the leading pass receivers in major-college football with 22.1 receiving yards per reception (first), and 442 receiving yards (seventh).

Morse was drafted by the Green Bay Packers but opted to play in the Canadian Football League with the Calgary Stampeders. He played with Calgary in 1957 and 1958.

Morse died in September 2023 at age 87.
