= Lynn Hovland =

American football player and coach (1916–2014)

Biographical details
- Born: 1916; Bloomer, Wisconsin, U.S.
- Died: August 15, 2014 (aged 97–98); University City, Missouri, U.S.

Playing career
- 1935–1938: Wisconsin
- Position: Guard

Coaching career (HC unless noted)
- 1947–1948: Wisconsin (assistant)
- 1949–1958: Washington University (assistant)
- 1959–1961: Washington University

Head coaching record
- Overall: 3–23

Accomplishments and honors

Awards
- Second-team All-Big Ten (1938)

Lynn F. Hovland (1916 – August 15, 2014) was an American college football player and coach. He served as the head football coach at Washington University in St. Louis from 1959 to 1961, compiling a record of 3–23.

== Head coaching record ==
Year	Team	Overall	Conference	Standing	Bowl/playoffs
Washington University Bears (Independent) (1959–1961)
1959	Washington University	1–7			
1960	Washington University	2–7			
1961	Washington University	0–9			
Washington University:		3–23			
Total:		3–23			
