= Vince Gavre =

American football player and coach (1914–2006)

Biographical details
- Born: April 5, 1914; Port Edwards, Wisconsin, U.S.
- Died: December 25, 2006 (aged 92); Keosauqua, Iowa, U.S.

Playing career
- 1936–1938: Wisconsin
- 1939: Kenosha Cardinals
- Position: Quarterback

Coaching career (HC unless noted)
- 1947: Wisconsin (assistant)
- 1948–1949: Western State (CO)

Head coaching record
- Overall: 11–7

Accomplishments and honors

Awards
- Second-team All-Big Ten (1938)

Vincent Marshall Gavre (April 5, 1914 – December 25, 2006) was an American football player and coach. He was selected in the tenth round of the 1939 NFL draft. He served as the head football coach at Western State College of Colorado—now known as Western Colorado University—in Gunnison, Colorado from 1948 to 1949, compiling a record of 11–7.

== Head coaching record ==
Year	Team	Overall	Conference	Standing	Bowl/playoffs
Western State Mountaineers (Rocky Mountain Conference) (1948–1949)
1948	Western State	6–4	2–1	2nd	
1949	Western State	5–3	1–2	3rd	
Western State:		11–7	3–3		
Total:		11–7			
