= George Walmsley =

Irish rugby union player

- Born: 20 December 1868 Navan, County Meath, Ireland
- Died: 2 August 1942 (aged 73) Shanklin, Isle of Wight

Rugby union career
- Position: Forward
International career
Years	Team	Apps	(Points)
1894	Ireland	1	(0)

George Walmsley (20 December 1868 — 2 August 1942) was an Irish international rugby union player.

Born in Navan, County Meath, Walmsley was a Bective Rangers player, capped once as a forward for Ireland against England at Blackheath, the second of their three wins to secure a historic first triple crown.

Walmsley was a railway official and became a manager for Great Southern Railways, based out of Kingsbridge.

== See also ==
- List of Ireland national rugby union players
