= National Register of Historic Places listings in LeFlore County, Oklahoma =

Location of LeFlore County in Oklahoma

This is a list of the National Register of Historic Places listings in LeFlore County, Oklahoma.

This is intended to be a complete list of the properties and districts on the National Register of Historic Places in LeFlore County, Oklahoma, United States. The locations of National Register properties and districts for which the latitude and longitude coordinates are included below, may be seen in a map.

There are 24 properties and districts listed on the National Register in the county.

This National Park Service list is complete through NPS recent listings posted October 23, 2026.

== Current listings ==
	Name on the Register	Image	Date listed	Location	City or town	Description
1	Arkoma School	Arkoma School	September 8, 1988 (#88001398)	Arkoma and Blocker Sts. 35°21′18″N 94°26′00″W	Arkoma	
2	Choctaw Agency	Choctaw Agency	May 5, 1972 (#72001074)	1 mile east of Skullyville on State Highway 9; 35°15′03″N 94°35′29″W	Spiro	
3	Peter Conser House	Peter Conser House	June 21, 1971 (#71000665)	47114 Conser Creek Rd. 34°50′21″N 94°41′21″W	Heavener	
4	Dog Creek School		September 8, 1988 (#88001399)	Southwest of Shady Point; 35°04′50″N 94°51′54″W	Shady Point	
5	Hotel Lowrey		November 30, 2020 (#100005860)	301 Dewey Ave. 35°03′08″N 94°37′18″W	Poteau	
6	Jenson Tunnel	Jenson Tunnel	May 13, 1976 (#76001567)	Northeast of Cameron off State Highway 112; 35°13′09″N 94°26′35″W	Cameron	
7	Lake Wister Locality	Lake Wister Locality	August 19, 1975 (#75001566)	Address Restricted	Lake Wister	Extends into Latimer County
8	LeFlore County Courthouse	LeFlore County Courthouse	August 23, 1984 (#84003099)	Courthouse Sq. 35°03′15″N 94°37′27″W	Poteau	
9	Old City Hall, Theater and Masonic Lodge	Old City Hall, Theater and Masonic Lodge	September 17, 2020 (#100005557)	401 East 1st St. 34°53′25″N 94°36′02″W	Heavener	
10	Old Military Road		October 22, 1976 (#76002155)	7 miles northeast of Talihina in the Ouachita National Forest; 34°47′46″N 94°56′38″W	Talihina	
11	Overstreet House		November 25, 1980 (#80004285)	Northeast of Cowlington off U.S. Route 59; 35°19′06″N 94°45′47″W	Cowlington	
12	Poteau Community Building	Poteau Community Building	September 8, 1988 (#88001403)	Hill and Hopkins Sts. 35°03′13″N 94°37′24″W	Poteau	
13	Poteau School Gymnasium-Auditorium	Poteau School Gymnasium-Auditorium	September 8, 1988 (#88001404)	Walter and Parker Sts. 35°03′07″N 94°37′03″W	Poteau	
14	James E. Reynolds House	James E. Reynolds House	April 13, 1977 (#77001093)	East of Cameron off State Highway 112; 35°08′03″N 94°31′47″W	Cameron	
15	Shady Point School		September 8, 1988 (#88001405)	Northeastern edge of the community 35°07′56″N 94°39′35″W	Shady Point	
16	Skullyville County Jail	Skullyville County Jail	November 6, 1980 (#80004286)	West of Panama; 35°10′25″N 94°43′04″W	Panama	
17	Spiro Mound Group	Spiro Mound Group	September 30, 1969 (#69000153)	18154 1st St. 35°18′40″N 94°34′58″W	Spiro	
18	State Line Marker	State Line Marker	November 18, 1976 (#76000448)	North of the east end of Highway 1 at the Arkansas state line 34°41′38″N 94°27′19″W	Whitesboro	Extends into Polk County, Arkansas
19	Summerfield School	Summerfield School	September 8, 1988 (#88001406)	34518 Reichert-Summerfield Rd. 34°53′50″N 94°52′00″W	Summerfield	
20	Terry House	Terry House	June 27, 1980 (#80004287)	Terry Hill; 35°03′14″N 94°37′44″W	Poteau	
21	Trahern's Station	Trahern's Station	April 25, 1972 (#72001073)	9 miles west of Shady Point; 35°07′10″N 94°48′13″W	Shady Point	
22	Tucker School	Tucker School	September 8, 1988 (#88001407)	Off U.S. Route 59; 35°17′56″N 94°44′05″W	Spiro	
23	Twyman Park	Twyman Park	September 8, 1988 (#88001402)	West St. 35°02′19″N 94°37′46″W	Poteau	
24	Williams School	Williams School	September 8, 1988 (#88001408)	Northwest of Cameron; 35°09′59″N 94°32′59″W	Cameron	

== See also ==
- List of National Historic Landmarks in Oklahoma
- National Register of Historic Places listings in Oklahoma
