= LeFlore County, Oklahoma =

County in Oklahoma, United States

- County
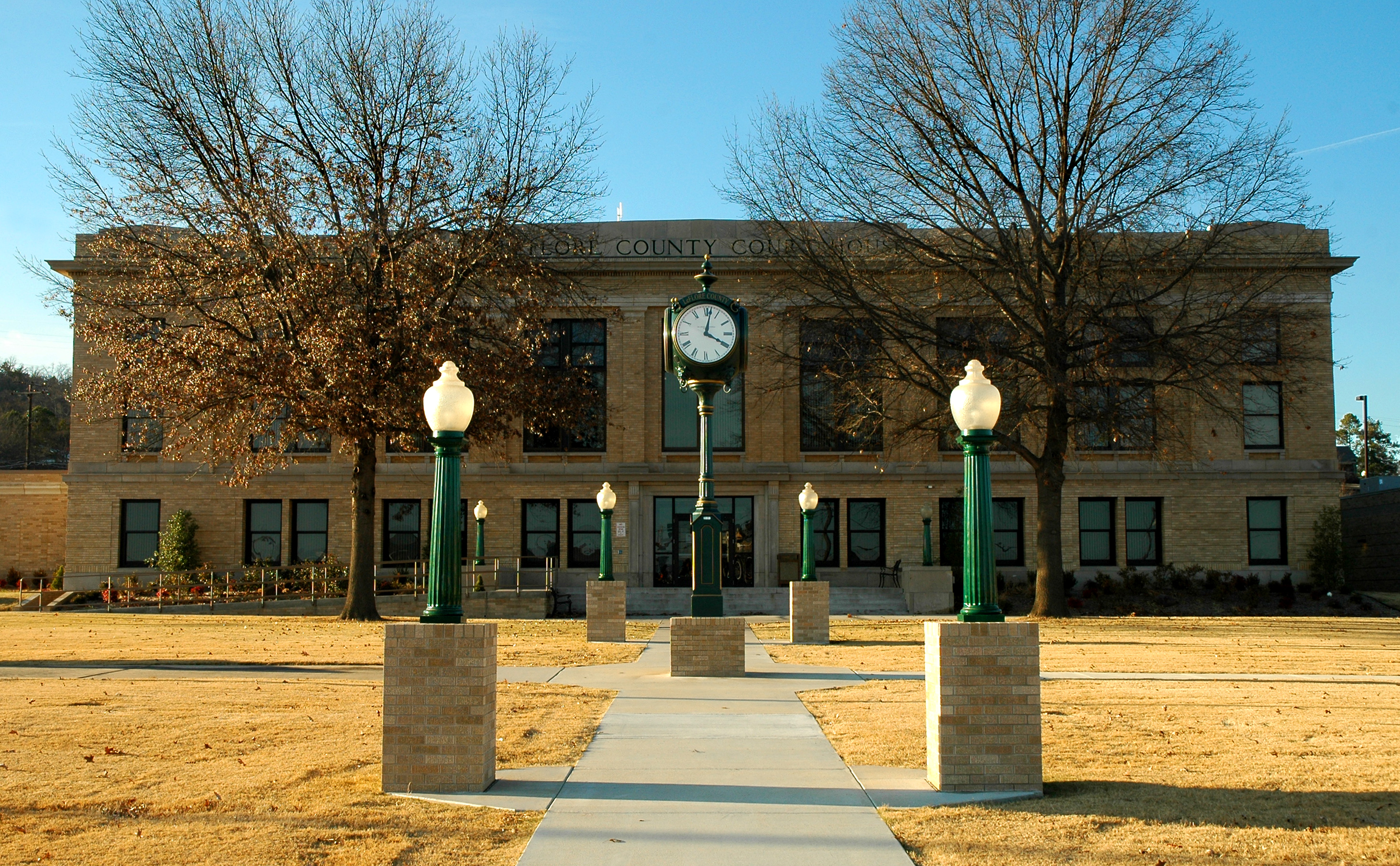
- LeFlore County Courthouse in Poteau

- Location within the U.S. state of Oklahoma
- Coordinates: 34.90°N 94.70°W
- Country: United States
- State: Oklahoma
- Founded: 1907
- Named for: An influential Choctaw Indian family
- Seat: Poteau
- Largest city: Poteau

Area
  - Total: 1,609 sq mi (4,170 km^{2})
  - Land: 1,589 sq mi (4,120 km^{2})
  - Water: 19 sq mi (49 km^{2}) 1.2%

Population (2020)
  - Total: 48,129
  - Estimate (2025): 50,196 ▲
  - Density: 30.29/sq mi (11.69/km^{2})
- Time zone: UTC−6 (Central)
  - Summer (DST): UTC−5 (CDT)
- Congressional district: 2nd

LeFlore County is a county along the eastern border of the U.S state of Oklahoma. As of the 2020 census, its population was 48,129. Its county seat is Poteau. The county honors a Choctaw family named LeFlore. The United States District Court for the Eastern District of Oklahoma is the federal district court with jurisdiction in LeFlore County. Tourist attractions in the county include Lake Wister, the Ouachita National Forest, and Heavener Runestone State Park. It is also home to the Winding Stair Mountain National Recreation Area, one of two national recreation areas in Oklahoma.

== History ==
The Choctaw Nation signed the Treaty of Doak's Stand in 1820, ceding part of their ancestral home in the Southeastern U.S. and receiving a large tract in Indian Territory. They signed the Treaty of Dancing Rabbit Creek in 1830, which ceded the remainder of their original homeland. Most of the remainder of the Choctaw were removed to Indian Territory, escorted by federal military troops, in several waves.

In 1832, the federal government constructed the Choctaw Agency in Indian Territory about 15 miles (24 km) west of Fort Smith, Arkansas. The town of Skullyville developed around the agency. It was designated as county seat of Skullyville County, the capital of the Moshulatubbee District of which Skullyville County was a part, and the national capital of the Choctaw Nation.

The U.S. Indian agents lived in the town. In the late 1850s, it was designated as a stage stop (Walker's Station) for the Butterfield Overland Mail route.

In 1834, the U.S. Army built Fort Coffee a few miles north of Skullyville, but reassigned the garrison after four years. The Methodist Church took over the facility, converting it for use as the Fort Coffee Academy for Boys, a missionary school. That church also established the New Hope Seminary for Girls in 1845, just east of town. In 1847, the Choctaw Agency burned and its functions were transferred to Fort Washita.

During the Civil War, the Choctaw allied with the Confederacy and many of their men served in its army. The Battle of Devil's Backbone was fought near the present town of Pocola on September 1, 1863. Union Major General James G. Blunt defeated Confederate Brigadier General William Cabell. Union troops burned the Fort Coffee Academy in 1863, because it was being used to house Confederate troops.

In 1866, the Choctaw government reopened New Hope Seminary, but never rebuilt a boys academy. New Hope Seminary operated until it burned in 1896. The first school for Choctaw freedmen opened at Boggy Depot. In 1892, the Tushkalusa (Black warriors) Freedmen Boarding school opened three miles southeast of Talihina.

From 1886, development of coal mining and timber production attracted considerable railroad construction; the Choctaw, Oklahoma and Gulf Railroad built tracks from Wister west to McAlester. In 1898, the company extended the line east from Wister to Howe, continuing the line to Arkansas in 1899. (This line was leased to the Chicago, Rock Island and Pacific Railway in 1904).

In 1896, the Kansas City, Pittsburg and Gulf Railroad (acquired by the Kansas City Southern Railway in 1900) built tracks through the region from north to south, exiting into Arkansas near the Page community in southern LeFlore County. In 1900-01, the Poteau Valley Railroad built a line from Shady Point to Sutter (later known as Calhoun, which they abandoned in 1926. Also in 1900-01, the Arkansas Western Railroad constructed tracks from Heavener east to Arkansas. In 1901, the Fort Smith and Western Railroad connected Coal Creek west to McCurtain in Haskell County. In 1903-04, the Midland Valley Railroad laid tracks from Arkansas west through Bokoshe to Muskogee. The Oklahoma and Rich Mountain Railroad, owned by the Dierks Lumber and Coal Company, constructed the county's last railroad, from Page to the lumber town of Pine Valley in 1925–26.

Prior to statehood, the area that became LeFlore County was part of Moshulatubbee and the Apukshunnubbee districts. Its present-day territory fell primarily within Nashoba, Skullyville, Sugar Loaf, and Wade Counties, with small portions falling within Cedar and San Bois Counties, in the Choctaw Nation.

Robert S. Kerr, former governor of Oklahoma and U.S. senator, established a ranch outside Poteau in the 1950s. In 1978, the family donated this residence to the state. It was adapted and opened for use as the Kerr Conference Center and Museum. The Kerr Center for Sustainable Agriculture and the Overstreet-Kerr Historical Farm are also in the county.

== Geography ==
According to the United States Census Bureau, the county has a total area of 1,609 square miles (4,170 km^{2}), of which 19 square miles (49 km^{2}) (1.2%) are covered by water.

The Arkansas River forms the northern boundary of the county, while its tributaries, the Poteau and James Fork Rivers drain much of the county into the Arkansas. The Kiamichi, Little and Mountain Fork Rivers drain the rest of the county into the Red River. The Ouachita Mountains extend into the southern part of the county, along with associated ranges: Winding Stair Mountains and Kiamichi Mountains. Cavanal Hill is partly in the northern part of the county.

== Natural attractions ==
Lake Wister, a flood-control reservoir, is in the central part of the county. The Ouachita National Forest, in the county's southern half, and Heavener Runestone State Park are tourist attractions. Additionally, Winding Stair Mountain National Recreation Area is located in the county. It is one of two national recreation areas located in Oklahoma, the other being Chickasaw.

=== Major highways ===
- U.S. Highway 59
- U.S. Highway 259
- U.S. Highway 270
- U.S. Highway 271
- State Highway 1
- State Highway 9
- State Highway 31
- State Highway 63

=== Adjacent counties ===
- Sequoyah County (north)
- Sebastian County, Arkansas (northeast)
- Scott County, Arkansas (east)
- Polk County, Arkansas (southeast)
- McCurtain County (south)
- Pushmataha County (southwest)
- Latimer County (west)
- Haskell County (northwest)

=== National protected areas ===
- Indian Nations National Wildlife and Scenic Area
- Ouachita National Forest (part)
- Winding Stair Mountain National Recreation Area
- Spiro Mounds

== Demographics ==
Historical population
Census	Pop.	Note	%±
1910	29,127		—
1920	42,765		46.8%
1930	42,896		0.3%
1940	45,866		6.9%
1950	35,276		−23.1%
1960	29,106		−17.5%
1970	32,137		10.4%
1980	40,698		26.6%
1990	43,270		6.3%
2000	48,109		11.2%
2010	50,384		4.7%
2020	48,129		−4.5%
2025 (est.)	50,196	▲	4.3%
U.S. Decennial Census; 1790-1960 1900-1990; 1990-2000 2010-2019

=== 2021 estimates ===
According to 2021 estimates, its median household income was $43,049 and the county had a poverty rate of 23.5%.

=== 2020 census ===
As of the 2020 United States census, the county had a population of 48,129. Of the residents, 23.8% were under the age of 18 and 18.7% were 65 years of age or older; the median age was 40.2 years. For every 100 females there were 100.9 males, and for every 100 females age 18 and over there were 99.2 males.

The racial makeup of the county was 67.8% White, 1.8% Black or African American, 14.8% American Indian and Alaska Native, 0.6% Asian, 3.8% from some other race, and 11.1% from two or more races. Hispanic or Latino residents of any race comprised 7.4% of the population.

There were 18,325 households in the county, of which 31.1% had children under the age of 18 living with them and 26.6% had a female householder with no spouse or partner present. About 27.3% of all households were made up of individuals and 13.1% had someone living alone who was 65 years of age or older.

There were 21,032 housing units, of which 12.9% were vacant. Among occupied housing units, 71.4% were owner-occupied and 28.6% were renter-occupied. The homeowner vacancy rate was 1.8% and the rental vacancy rate was 9.6%.

=== 2000 census ===
As of the 2000 census, 48,109 people, 17,861 households, and 13,199 families were residing in the county. The population density was 30 inhabitants per square mile (12/km^{2}). The 20,142 housing units had an average density of 13 units per square mile (5.0/km^{2}). The racial makeup of the county was 80.35% White, 2.21% African American, 10.72% Native American, 0.21% Asian], 0.03% Pacific Islander, 1.44% from other races, and 5.03% from two or more races. About 3.84% of the population were Hispanics or Latinos of any race. By ancestry, 22.7% were of American, 10.1% Irish, 9.6% German, and 7.7% English.

Of the 17,861 households, 33.4% had children under 18 living with them, 58.5% were married couples living together, 11.0% had a female householder with no husband present, and 26.1% were not families. About 23.1% of all households were made up of individuals, and 10.9% had someone living alone who was 65 or older. The average household size was 2.61 and the average family size was 3.05. In the county, the age distribution was 26.1% under 18, 9.7% from 18 to 24, 27.0% from 25 to 44, 23.3% from 45 to 64, and 13.8% who were 65 or older. The median age was 36 years. For every 100 females, there were 99.3 males. For every 100 females 18 and over, there were 97.8 males.

The median income for a household in the county was $27,278, and for a family was $32,603. Males had a median income of $26,214 versus $19,792 for females. The per capita income for the county was $13,737. About 15.4% of families and 19.1% of the population were below the poverty line, including 24.1% of those under 18 and 16.5% of those 65 or over.

== Politics ==
Voter Registration and Party Enrollment as of June 30, 2023
Party	Number of Voters	Percentage
Democratic	7,944	28.27%
Republican	15,442	54.95%
Libertarian	198	0.70%
Unaffiliated	4,520	16.08%
Total	28,104	100%

United States presidential election results for LeFlore County, Oklahoma
Year	Republican		Democratic		Third party(ies)	
Year	No.	%	No.	%	No.	%
1908	1,771	45.62%	1,872	48.22%	239	6.16%
1912	1,538	37.68%	2,019	49.46%	525	12.86%
1916	1,944	37.56%	2,576	49.77%	656	12.67%
1920	4,934	54.32%	3,764	41.44%	386	4.25%
1924	3,326	40.33%	4,069	49.34%	852	10.33%
1928	5,168	52.48%	4,622	46.94%	57	0.58%
1932	2,363	21.40%	8,680	78.60%	0	0.00%
1936	3,894	32.53%	8,061	67.35%	14	0.12%
1940	4,664	35.64%	8,379	64.03%	44	0.34%
1944	3,667	39.22%	5,660	60.54%	22	0.24%
1948	2,821	29.36%	6,786	70.64%	0	0.00%
1952	4,631	42.18%	6,349	57.82%	0	0.00%
1956	4,310	44.96%	5,276	55.04%	0	0.00%
1960	5,302	52.26%	4,844	47.74%	0	0.00%
1964	3,904	35.46%	7,105	64.54%	0	0.00%
1968	3,600	32.83%	4,020	36.66%	3,345	30.51%
1972	7,932	67.45%	3,433	29.19%	394	3.35%
1976	4,907	37.50%	8,033	61.39%	145	1.11%
1980	6,807	49.47%	6,668	48.46%	284	2.06%
1984	8,604	58.54%	5,990	40.75%	104	0.71%
1988	6,964	51.05%	6,594	48.34%	83	0.61%
1992	5,850	34.90%	7,843	46.79%	3,070	18.31%
1996	5,689	39.74%	6,831	47.72%	1,796	12.55%
2000	8,215	54.82%	6,536	43.62%	234	1.56%
2004	10,683	61.31%	6,741	38.69%	0	0.00%
2008	11,605	69.32%	5,136	30.68%	0	0.00%
2012	11,177	70.57%	4,662	29.43%	0	0.00%
2016	13,362	77.59%	3,250	18.87%	609	3.54%
2020	15,213	80.90%	3,299	17.54%	293	1.56%
2024	15,333	81.76%	3,184	16.98%	237	1.26%

== Communities ==
=== Cities ===
- Heavener
- Poteau (county seat)

=== Towns ===
- Arkoma
- Bokoshe
- Cameron
- Cowlington
- Fanshawe (partly in Latimer County)
- Fort Coffee
- Howe
- LeFlore
- Panama
- Pocola
- Rock Island
- Shady Point
- Spiro
- Talihina
- Wister

=== Census-designated places ===
- Hodgen
- Monroe
- Whitesboro

=== Other unincorporated communities ===
- Big Cedar
- Milton
- Muse
- Octavia
- Page
- Skullyville

== NRHP sites ==
These sites in LeFlore County are listed on the National Register of Historic Places:

- Arkoma School, Arkoma
- Choctaw Agency (Walker's Station), Spiro
- Peter Conser House, Hodgen
- Dog Creek School, Shady Point
- Hotel Lowrey, Poteau
- Jenson Tunnel, Cameron
- Lake Wister Locality, Lake Wister
- LeFlore County Courthouse, Poteau
- Old City Hall, Theater and Masonic Lodge, Heavener
- Old Military Road, Talihina
- Overstreet House, Cowlington
- Poteau Community Building, Poteau
- Poteau School Gymnasium-Auditorium, Poteau
- James E. Reynolds House, Cameron
- Shady Point School, Shady Point
- Skullyville County Jail, Panama
- Spiro Mound Group, Redland
- State Line Marker, Whitesboro
- Summerfield School (Oklahoma), Summerfield
- Terry House (Poteau, Oklahoma), Poteau
- Trahern's Station, Shadypoint
- Tucker School (Spiro, Oklahoma), Spiro
- Twyman Park, Poteau
- Williams School (Cameron, Oklahoma), Cameron
