= Tucker School =

Tucker School may refer to:

- Tucker School (Tucker, Arkansas), listed on the National Register of Historic Places in Jefferson County, Arkansas
- Tucker School (Spiro, Oklahoma), listed on the National Register of Historic Places in Le Flore County, Oklahoma
