= James M. Culberson =

American football coach and athletic director (1901–1994)

Biographical details
- Born: July 19, 1901; Skullyville, Oklahoma, U.S.
- Died: August 27, 1994 (aged 93); Asheboro, North Carolina, U.S.

Playing career
- c. 1922–1923: Southwestern (TN)

Coaching career (HC unless noted)
- 1935–1938: Southeastern State (OK)

Head coaching record
- Overall: 15–22–2

James Matthew Culbertson Sr. (July 19, 1901 – August 27, 1994) was an American college football coach and athletics administrator. A member of the Choctaw Nation, he served as the head football coach at Southeastern State Teachers College—now known as Southeastern Oklahoma State University—from 1935 to 1938, compiling a record of 15–22–2.

== Head coaching record ==
Year	Team	Overall	Conference	Standing	Bowl/playoffs
Southeastern State Savages (Oklahoma Collegiate Athletic Conference) (1935–1938)
1935	Southeastern State	4–4–2	2–2–1	T–3rd	
1936	Southeastern State	4–7	3–3	3rd	
1937	Southeastern State	0–8	0–6	7th	
1938	Southeastern State	7–3	4–2	3rd	
Southeastern State:		15–22–2	9–13–1		
Total:		15–22–2			
