= LeFlore, Oklahoma =

- Town
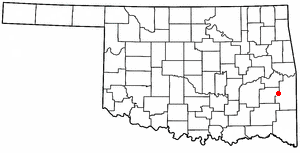
- Location of LeFlore, Oklahoma
- Coordinates: 34°53′53″N 94°58′38″W
- Country: United States
- State: Oklahoma
- County: LeFlore

Area
  - Total: 1.32 sq mi (3.42 km^{2})
  - Land: 1.31 sq mi (3.40 km^{2})
  - Water: 0.0039 sq mi (0.01 km^{2})
- Elevation: 545 ft (166 m)

Population (2020)
  - Total: 150
  - Density: 114.1/sq mi (44.07/km^{2})
- Time zone: UTC-6 (Central (CST))
  - Summer (DST): UTC-5 (CDT)
- ZIP code: 74942
- Area codes: 539/918
- FIPS code: 40-42150
- GNIS feature ID: 2412884

LeFlore is a town in LeFlore County, Oklahoma, United States. The population was 198 at the 2010 census, an increase of 13.1 percent over the figure of 168 in 2000. Although the legal town name is spelled in the two-word form, the official federal name for the place and the postal name used is Leflore.

== History ==
The community was established as a station stop on the St. Louis and San Francisco Railroad, which opened in 1887. A post office opened at LeFlore, Indian Territory on August 26, 1887. The community was named for the LeFlore family.

At the time of its founding, LeFlore was located in the Moshulatubbee District of the Choctaw Nation.

== Geography ==
LeFlore is located approximately 25 miles (40 km) west of Poteau.

According to the United States Census Bureau, the town has a total area of 1.4 square miles (3.6 km^{2}), of which 1.4 square miles (3.6 km^{2}) is land and 0.71% is water.

== Demographics ==
Historical population
Census	Pop.	Note	%±
1970	175		—
1980	322		84.0%
1990	119		−63.0%
2000	168		41.2%
2010	190		13.1%
2020	150		−21.1%
U.S. Decennial Census

As of the census of 2000, there were 168 people, 65 households, and 47 families residing in the town. The population density was 120.7 inhabitants per square mile (46.6/km^{2}). There were 79 housing units at an average density of 56.7 per square mile (21.9/km^{2}). The racial makeup of the town was 67.26% White, 27.98% Native American, 0.60% Asian, and 4.17% from two or more races. Hispanic or Latino of any race were 0.60% of the population.

There were 65 households, out of which 36.9% had children under the age of 18 living with them, 56.9% were married couples living together, 10.8% had a female householder with no husband present, and 26.2% were non-families. 23.1% of all households were made up of individuals, and 9.2% had someone living alone who was 65 years of age or older. The average household size was 2.58 and the average family size was 3.04.

In the town, the population was spread out, with 26.2% under the age of 18, 10.7% from 18 to 24, 23.2% from 25 to 44, 25.0% from 45 to 64, and 14.9% who were 65 years of age or older. The median age was 36 years. For every 100 females, there were 115.4 males. For every 100 females age 18 and over, there were 110.2 males.

The median income for a household in the town was $25,833, and the median income for a family was $25,833. Males had a median income of $22,083 versus $23,125 for females. The per capita income for the town was $14,680. About 18.8% of families and 29.7% of the population were below the poverty line, including 43.8% of those under the age of 18 and 10.3% of those 65 or over.
