= Robert S. Kerr Airport =

Airport in Oklahoma, United States of America

- IATA: RKR; ICAO: KRKR; FAA LID: RKR

Summary
- Airport type: Public
- Owner: City of Poteau
- Serves: Poteau, Oklahoma
- Elevation AMSL: 450 ft / 137 m
- Coordinates: 35°01′18″N 094°37′16″W

Map
- Location of airport in Oklahoma RKR (the United States)

Runways
Direction	Length		Surface
Direction	ft	m	Surface
18/36	4,007	1,221	Asphalt

Statistics (2011)
- Aircraft operations: 6,000
- Based aircraft: 27
- Source: Federal Aviation Administration

Robert S. Kerr Airport (IATA: RKR, ICAO: KRKR, FAA LID: RKR) is a city-owned, public-use airport located two nautical miles (4 km) south of the central business district of Poteau, a city in Le Flore County, Oklahoma, United States. It is included in the National Plan of Integrated Airport Systems for 2011–2015, which categorized it as a general aviation facility.

== Facilities and aircraft ==
Robert S. Kerr Airport covers an area of 175 acres (71 ha) at an elevation of 450 feet (137 m) above mean sea level. It has one runway designated 18/36 with an asphalt surface measuring 4,007 by 75 feet (1,221 x 23 m).

For the 12-month period ending September 21, 2011, the airport had 6,000 general aviation aircraft operations, an average of 16 per day. At that time there were 27 aircraft based at this airport: 89% single-engine and 11% ultralight.

== See also ==
- List of airports in Oklahoma
