= Calhoun, Oklahoma =

Town in Oklahoma, United States

Coordinates: 35°06′13″N 94°44′46″W

Calhoun, originally called Sutter, is an unincorporated community in Le Flore County in the State of Oklahoma, approximately 7 miles northwest of Poteau, the county seat. Located about 6.5 driving miles west-southwest of Shady Point, Oklahoma, Calhoun can be reached off of US Route 59 at Shady Point by heading west on County Road D1310, then County Road 90. The town is just northwest of Cavanal Hill, which makes the eccentric boast of being the “world’s highest hill.”

For a while a coal mining boomtown, Calhoun later waned along with the industry.

== History ==
The settlement began existence under the name of Sutter. When the nearby town of Shady Point got a railroad connection during 1895-1896 courtesy of the Kansas City, Pittsburg and Gulf Railroad, later the Kansas City Southern Railway (“KCS”), Sutter coal began to flow through Shady Point primarily for the railroad's own use. Transportation between the two points was improved in the 1900-1901 timeframe when the Choctaw Coal & Mining Company incorporated its own railway, the Poteau Valley Railroad (“PVR”), on October 19, 1900, which built a 6.6 mile line from a connection with the KCS at Shady Point directly to the mines at Sutter.

Sequoyah Coal Mining Company succeeded to the ownership of the PVR by 1905. In 1910, Sequoyah Coal Mining was shipping six to ten carloads of coal out of Sutter each day. The town had three substantial mercantile firms, a cotton gin, a grist mill, a Baptist church, and a public school.

The KCS took over the PVR on March 2, 1912, but the line continued to operate separately. In 1914, the town changed names and became Calhoun.

By 1921, KCS was losing money on providing passenger trains to Calhoun, and attempted to reduce the two passenger trains which ran in each direction every day except Sunday down to one. Such trains were timed to make a connection with the KCS train to or from Poteau. But the attempt was blocked by the Oklahoma Corporation Commission, and passenger service to the town continued as before. At that time, the town had about 1500 residents, 300 of whom were directly employed as miners. Calhoun had eleven various retail stores, with the largest mercantile in town owned by mining company Central Coal & Lumber. The town had no hospital, the nearest being in Fort Smith, Arkansas. About 90% of banking transactions by residents were done in Poteau.

As the coal industry waned, so did the town. Rail service to Calhoun was finally abandoned altogether in 1926. By the time of the Thirty-sixth annual report of the Department of Mines and Minerals in 1943, no production at all was shown from Calhoun in Le Flore County.
