= Hotel Lowrey (Poteau, Oklahoma) =

Historic building in Oklahoma

Coordinates: 35.0523°N 94.6214°W

The Hotel Lowrey building was constructed in Poteau, Oklahoma, in 1922 by Wiley W. Lowrey in the Classical Revival style. Originally the town's largest commercial office and retail building, it was reconfigured in the 1931–1932 timeframe to be a combined hotel and office building. The hotel featured modern touches such as all-electric lighting, air cooling, and a bath in each room. Being located at the corner of Dewey Avenue and Witte Street, it was situated between the Kansas City Southern Railway and St. Louis-San Francisco Railway lines, and the second floor featured public showers for train travelers who wanted to freshen up while waiting for their train connections.

The hotel ceased operations in 1965, and the building had other uses until being leased to the LeFlore County Historical Society in 2008. Much has since been restored. It was listed on the National Register of Historic Places listings in Le Flore County, Oklahoma in 2021.
