= Skullyville, Oklahoma =

Skullyville, Oklahoma Iskuli (Choctaw)
- Unincorporated community
- Location within Oklahoma Location within the United States
- Coordinates: 35°15′15″N 94°35′35″W
- Country: United States
- State: Oklahoma
- County: Le Flore
- Established: 1832
- Disestablished: 1917
- Elevation: 509 ft (155 m)
- Time zone: UTC-6 (Central (CST))
  - Summer (DST): UTC-5 (CDT)
- GNIS feature ID: 1098103

Skullyville (also spelled Scullyville) is an unincorporated rural community in Le Flore County, Oklahoma, United States. It is approximately one mile east of Spiro and 15 miles (24 km) southwest of Fort Smith, Arkansas. The community is within the Fort Smith, Arkansas-Oklahoma Metropolitan Statistical Area.

The name is derived from Iskuli, the Choctaw word for money, because originally this was the place where members collected their annuity payments at the Choctaw Agency.

== History ==
It was capital of the Choctaw Nation, capital of the Moshulatubbee District of the Choctaw Nation, and in the late 1850s a stop for the Butterfield Stage. It developed as a political and business center of the nation before the Civil War. Skullyville was the site of the Choctaw Agency from 1832 until 1839.

During the Civil War, after the Choctaw allied with the Confederacy, the town suffered serious damage in warfare. Afterward, the town was bypassed by construction of a new railroad in the area, and it was abandoned by businessmen who moved to the nearest railroad station. In 1917, closure of the post office marked the final decline of the community. It is now considered a ghost town, and little more than the cemetery remains.

The Choctaw Indian agency was built on this site in 1832, after the federal government conducted removal of the tribe to Indian Territory. The US Indian agent distributed annuity payments here, and a trading and business community developed around the post. Until 1859, after unification of the three districts of the Nation, the community was officially called "Choctaw Agency". Major F. W. Armstrong served as the first US agent until his death in 1835. He was succeeded by his brother, William Armstrong.

The Choctaw designated Skullyville, then known as "Oak Lodge", as county seat of Skullyville County, the capital of the Moshulatubbee District of the Nation, and as the capital of the Choctaw Nation. It also served as a stop on the California Road. Walker's Station, a stage stop on the Butterfield Overland Mail route, was located in Skullyville. Unusually for the Choctaw Nation's county governments, an extant building from its time as county seat has survived: the Skullyville County Jail.

The name "Skullyville" is derived from iskulli or iskuli, the Choctaw word for money. This was the place where tribal members could collect their annuity payments at the Choctaw Agency. Author W. B. Morrison suggests that the English meaning of Skullyville was "Moneytown".

In 1834 the US Army built Fort Coffee at Swallow Rock, about 3 miles (5 km) north of the Choctaw Agency. The army maintained it for four years; it reassigned the garrison as no longer needed. The facility was transferred to Methodist missionaries, who adapted it as a boys' school, known as Fort Coffee Academy. During the Civil War, the buildings were burned down in the conflict. This school was never reopened.

During the mid-1840s, the Methodist Church established New Hope Seminary, a girls' school, in Skullyville. It attracted students from all over the Choctaw Nation. It closed during the war, but reopened afterward. It continued to operate until the building burned down in 1896.

During the 1840s Skullyville had become a political, educational and social center for the Choctaw. But after the nation moved the national capital to Doaksville in 1850, tensions among factions erupted into more tribal political strife. In 1858 a majority of members adopted the Skullyville Constitution at a convention in Skullyville. It abolished the three districts to unify the nation under one principal leader, known as the governor.

Tandy Walker, from a prominent Choctaw family, took over the former Choctaw Agency building when he was appointed in 1858 as supervisor of the Butterfield Stage stop. He was also elected as governor of the unified Choctaw Nation. He adapted this building for use both as his residence and with space for the Butterfield Stage office. Walker retained it as his home until he died in 1877. According to Morrison, the old agency building still stood in the 1930s. The structure is listed in the National Register of Historic Places (NR 72001074).

Skullyville began to decline after the Civil War. The Choctaw aligned with the Confederacy and served in their army. The boys' academy and other buildings were burned during warfare in the town. After the Kansas City Southern Railway bypassed the town in 1895, the local businessmen moved to Spiro, the closest railroad station. They judged this service as essential for their trading and getting their products to market. When the post office closed in 1917, this event essentially marked the death of the community. Skullyville is now a ghost town, with only a cemetery remaining.

== Notable people ==
- Frank Crawford Armstrong, general in the Confederate Army, born in Skullyville
- Douglas H. Johnston, Chickasaw Nation governor (1898-1902), and (1904-1939)
- Green McCurtain, Choctaw principal chief (1896-1900, 1902-1910)
