= Terry House (Poteau, Oklahoma) =

- U.S. National Register of Historic Places
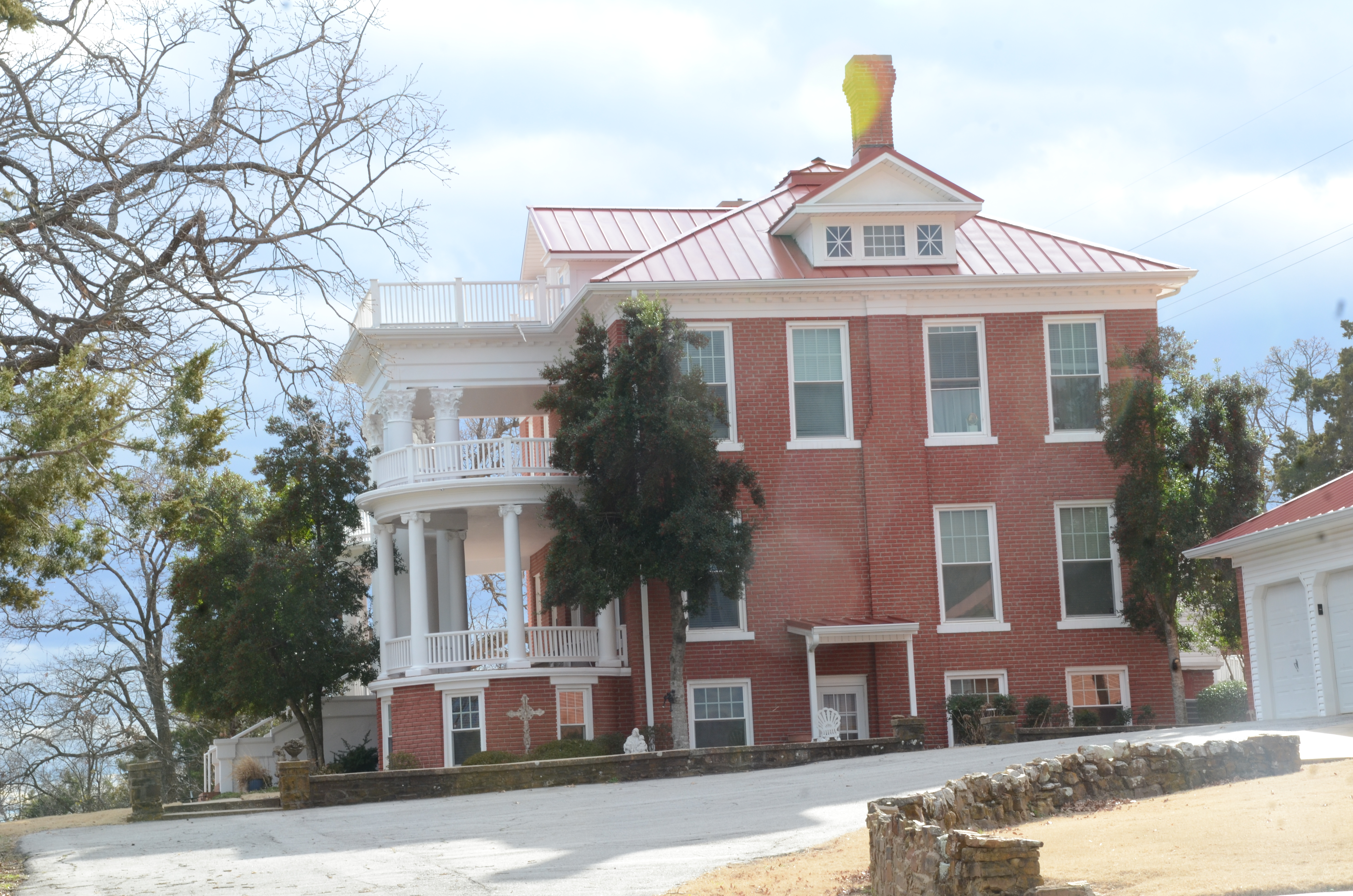

- Location within Oklahoma Location within the United States
- Location: Terry Hill, Poteau, Oklahoma
- Coordinates: 35°3′14″N 94°37′44″W
- Area: less than one acre
- Built: 1913
- Built by: Terry, George W.
- NRHP reference No.: 80004287
- Added to NRHP: June 27, 1980

Terry House, on Terry Hill in Poteau in Le Flore County, Oklahoma, also known as Woodson House, was built in 1913. It was listed on the National Register of Historic Places in 1980.

The house is prominently visible from afar upon a hill and itself has views over a plain and to the Arkansas Mountains.

It is a three-story building upon a full basement and is constructed of mitered red brick from Coffeyville, Kansas. It has a hipped roof broken by three pedimented dormers and two main chimneys. The front center of the building has six two-story hollow wood Corinthian columns supporting an entablature, with a balcony with balustrade at its second floor level. The central porch is flanked by almost-circular porches two stories tall running from basement level through first floor level.

The house was started in 1913 "by an eccentric banker, George W. Terry, who came to the area shortly after statehood", but who died in 1918 with the building not complete. A baker named Pemberton bought the house in 1926 and completed chimneys and ceilings.
