= Poteau School Gymnasium-Auditorium =

- Poteau School Gymnasium--Auditorium
- U.S. National Register of Historic Places
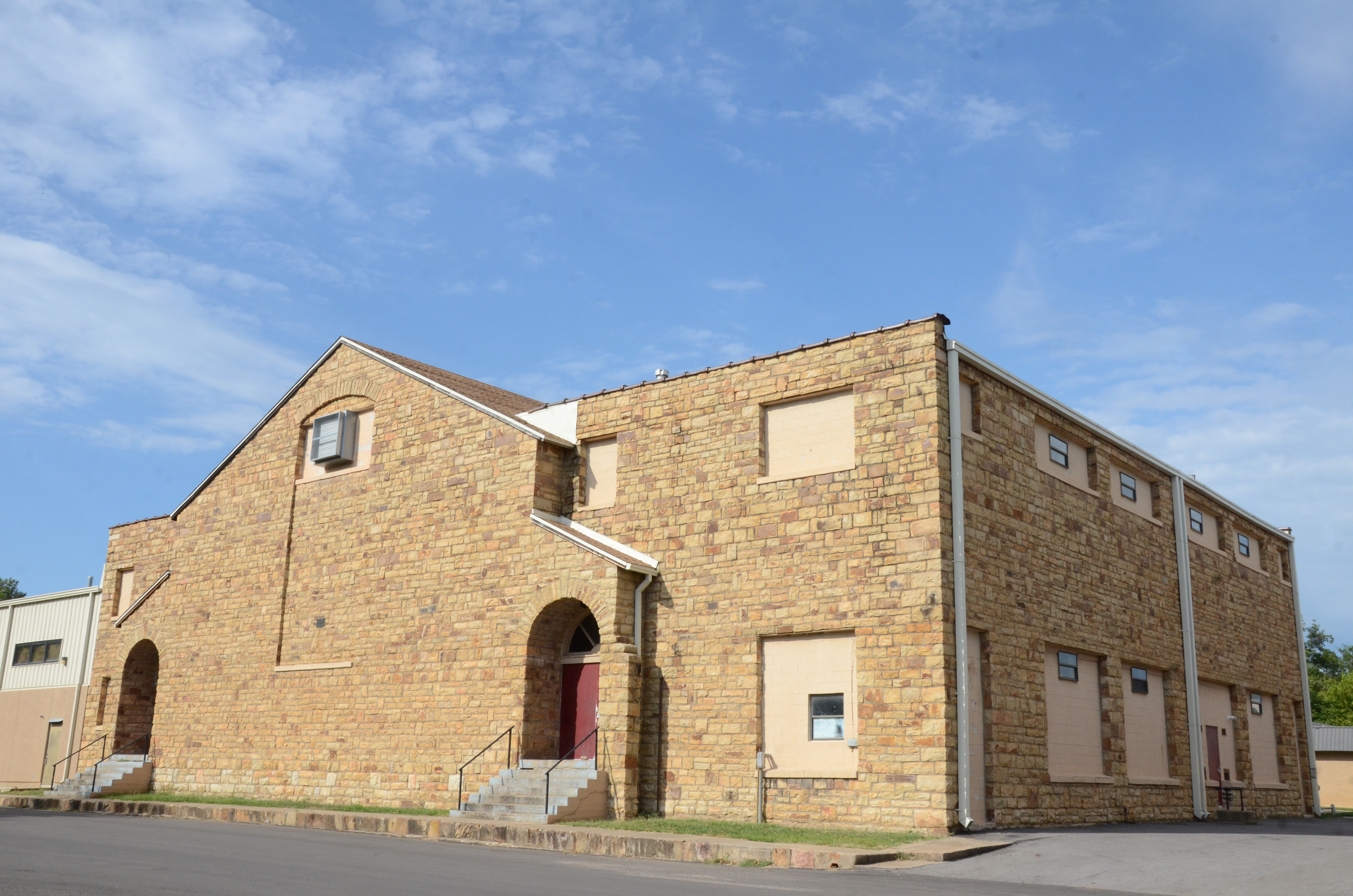

- Location within Oklahoma Location within the United States
- Location: Walter and Parker Sts., Poteau, Oklahoma
- Coordinates: 35.051918°N 94.617576°W
- Area: less than one acre
- Built: 1937
- Built by: Works Progress Administration
- MPS: WPA Public Bldgs., Recreational Facilities and Cemetery Improvements in Southeastern Oklahoma, 1935-1943 TR
- NRHP reference No.: 88001404
- Added to NRHP: September 8, 1988

The Poteau School Gymnasium-Auditorium, located at Walter and Parker Sts. in Poteau in Le Flore County, Oklahoma, was built in 1937. It was listed on the National Register of Historic Places in 1988.

It was a project of the Works Progress Administration.

It is a two-story 100 by 78 feet (30 m × 24 m) building built of coursed cream-colored native sandstone, with a roof that is flat and gabled and has parapets.

Its NRHP nomination describes its importance:

The gym/auditorium is significant because is provided space for school and community activities, especially basketball, which fostered a sense of identity and pride lacking in the depression era. Construction of it also provided work opportunities for unskilled and unemployed laborers in the Poteau area where few had existed previously. As a WPA building, the structure is notable for its size/scale. Within the community it is unique architecturally because of its type, style, scale, materials and workmanship.

It was one of 48 buildings and 11 structures reviewed in a 1985 study of WPA works in southeastern Oklahoma, which led to almost all of them being listed on the National Register in 1988.
