= Poteau Community Building =

- U.S. National Register of Historic Places
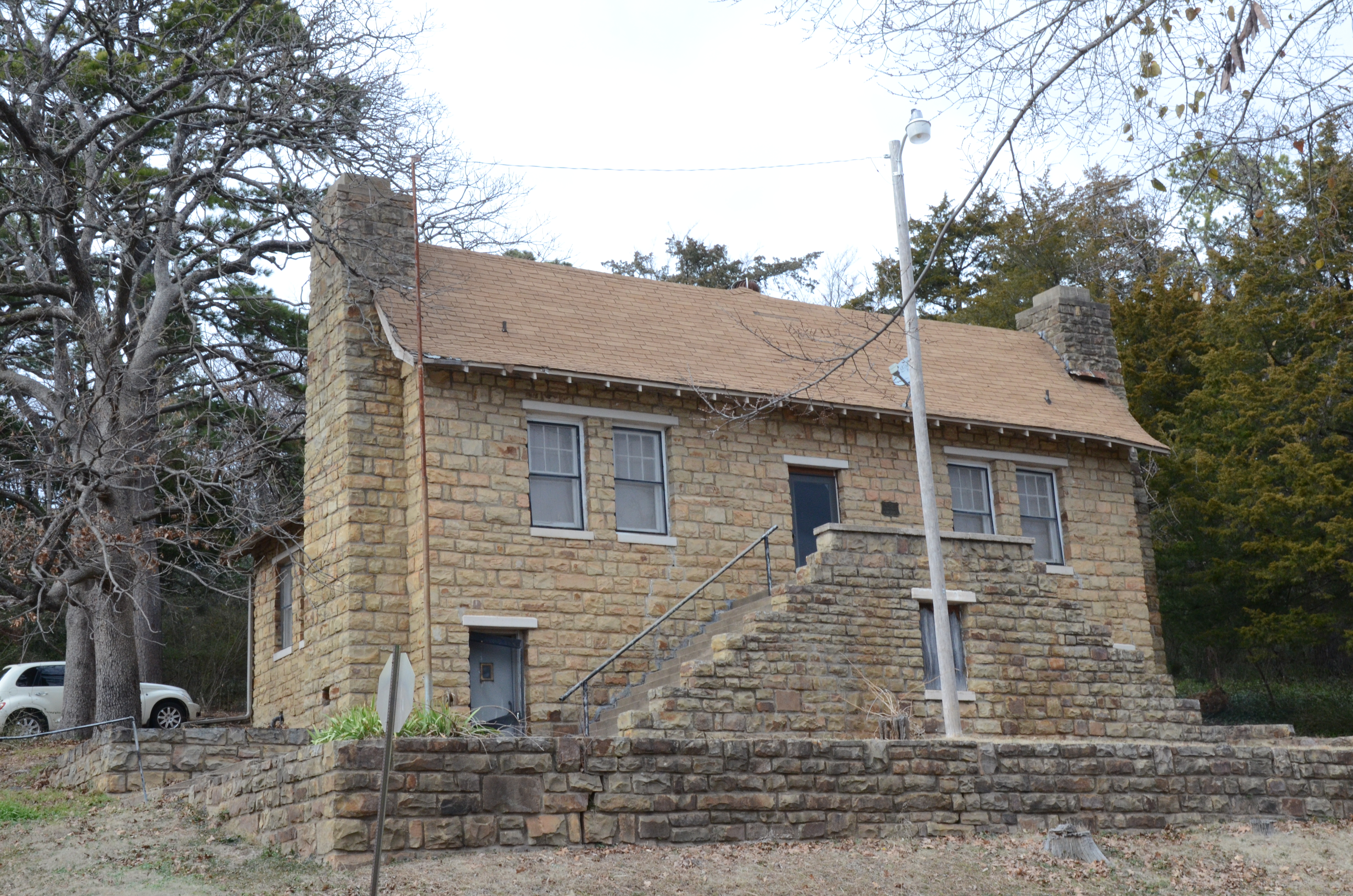

- Location within Oklahoma Location within the United States
- Location: Hill and Hopkins Sts., Poteau, Oklahoma
- Coordinates: 35°3′13″N 94°37′24″W
- Area: less than one acre
- Built: 1937
- Built by: Works Progress Administration
- MPS: WPA Public Bldgs., Recreational Facilities and Cemetery Improvements in Southeastern Oklahoma, 1935--1943 TR
- NRHP reference No.: 88001403
- Added to NRHP: September 8, 1988

The Poteau Community Building, in Poteau in Le Flore County in southeastern Oklahoma, is a multipurpose community building built as Works Progress Administration project in 1937. It was listed on the National Register of Historic Places in 1988.

It is a two-story 39 by 35 feet (12 m × 11 m) structure made of rusticated and coursed native sandstone with exterior chimneys at each end.

It was one of multiple WPA-related properties studied as a group in 1985, many of which were then listed on the National Register.
