= Poteau Valley Railroad =

Shortline railroad in Oklahoma

Overview
- Headquarters: Sutter, Oklahoma, later Oklahoma City
- Locale: Oklahoma
- Dates of operation: 1900–1926

Technical
- Track gauge: 4 ft 8 1/2 in (1,435 mm) standard gauge
- Length: 7.883 mi (12.686 km)

The Poteau Valley Railroad was a shortline running from Calhoun, Oklahoma to Shady Point, Oklahoma, encompassing 7.883 mi (12.686 km) of track. It began in 1900 and was abandoned in 1926.

== History ==
The small settlement of Shady Valley, Oklahoma had been relocated from its original site to be on the proposed route of the Kansas City, Pittsburg and Gulf Railroad, which line actually reached the town during 1895–1896. That line was purchased in 1900 by the Kansas City Southern Railway (“KCS”). Shady Valley prospered as a shipping point for coal, which came to the KCS from mines at the nearby town of what was then Sutter, becoming Calhoun in 1914.

Against that backdrop, the Poteau Valley Railroad was incorporated October 19, 1900. Its stated goal was to run from Fort Smith, Arkansas via Shady Point, Sutter and McAlester to Guthrie in what was then Indian Territory. However, the immediate goal for its owner, the Choctaw Coal & Mining Company, was to run the line from a connection with the KCS at Shady Point west-southwest to the mines at Sutter, across what was then Skullyville County, Choctaw Nation, Indian Territory. The line was built in the 1900-1901 timeframe, giving the railroad 6.61 miles of mainline, plus 1.273 miles of other tracks, for a total of 7.883 miles of trackage.

Choctaw Coal & Mining Company was succeeded as the railroad's owner in 1905 by the Sequoyah Coal Mining Company. The stock of the railroad was purchased March 2, 1912 by the KCS, but the line continued to be operated separately. Headquarters of the railway was in Sutter, changing in 1913 to Oklahoma City. Haulage of coal was the chief occupation of the road, constituting 6 to 10 carloads per day, most of said coal being used by the KCS itself. However, the Poteau Valley did also carry passengers. Two passenger trains ran in each direction every day except Sunday. Such trains were timed to make a connection with the KCS train to or from Poteau. The road had only one locomotive and one passenger car, both purchased second-hand from the KCS. The locomotive dated from 1897.

As the coal industry waned, so did the railroad. The line was finally abandoned in 1926.
