= Arkoma School =

- U.S. National Register of Historic Places
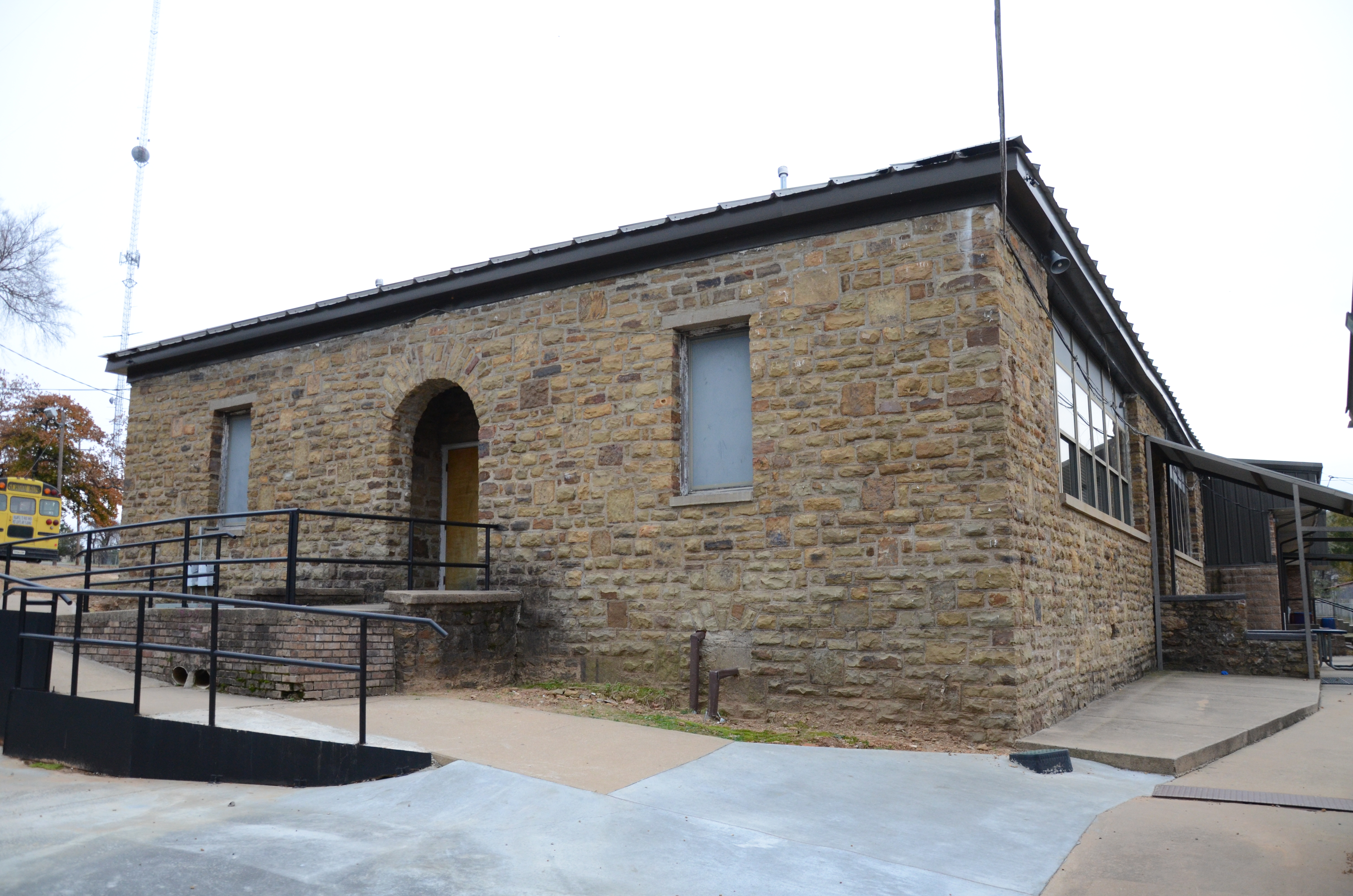

- Location within Oklahoma Location within the United States
- Location: Arkoma and Blocker Sts., Arkoma, Oklahoma
- Coordinates: 35°21′18″N 94°26′0″W
- Area: less than one acre
- Built: 1937
- Built by: Works Progress Administration
- Architect: Okla. State Dept. of Education
- Architectural style: Richardsonian Romanesque(?)
- MPS: WPA Public Bldgs., Recreational Facilities and Cemetery Improvements in Southeastern Oklahoma, 1935--1943 TR
- NRHP reference No.: 88001398
- Added to NRHP: September 8, 1988

The Arkoma School in Arkoma in Le Flore County, Oklahoma was a Works Progress Administration-funded project completed in 1937. It was listed on the National Register of Historic Places in 1988.

It is a four-room 74 by 42 feet (23 m × 13 m) building built of cut and coursed local sandstone, with a hipped roof. It was still in use as a school in 1988.

Its NRHP nomination asserts that in its design there is an allusion to Richardsonian Romanesque style, but it is a straightforward construction. Its design was taken from a pattern book of the Oklahoma State Department of Education.
