= Walker's Station =

Overland Mail stagecoach stop in Oklahoma

- Choctaw Agency
- U.S. National Register of Historic Places
- Location within Oklahoma Location within the United States
- Nearest city: Spiro, Oklahoma
- Coordinates: 35°15′3″N 94°35′29″W
- NRHP reference No.: 72001074
- Added to NRHP: May 5, 1972

Walker's Station was a stage stand on the old Butterfield Overland Mail route in Indian Territory. It was located at the old Choctaw Agency in Skullyville, in what is now Le Flore County, Oklahoma. The station was named for Tandy Walker, Choctaw chief, and later, Governor of the Choctaw Nation. The old Choctaw Agency building was his residence.

Walker's Station was added to the National Register of Historic Places (#72001074) in 1972.
