= LeFlore County Courthouse =

- U.S. National Register of Historic Places
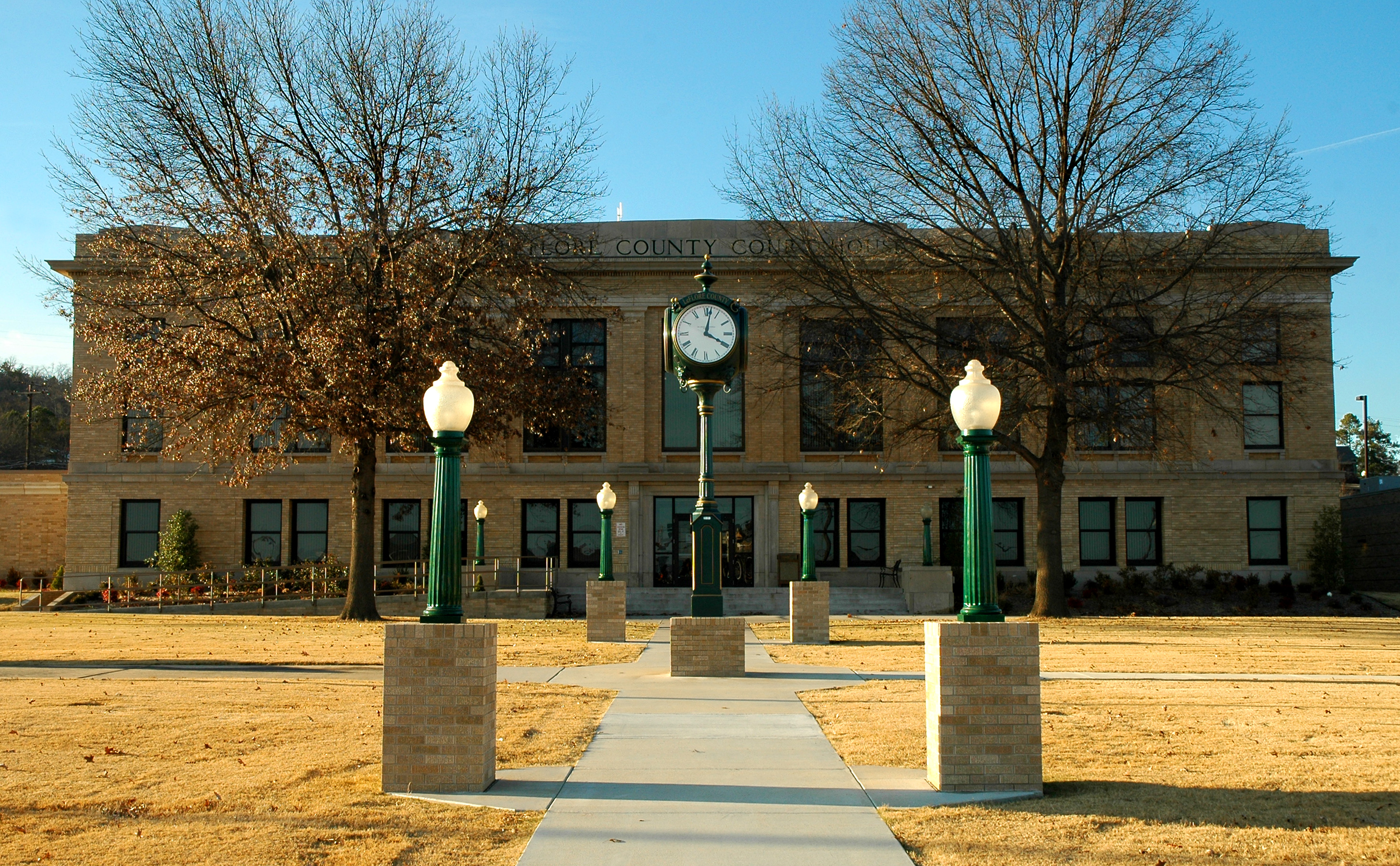

- Location within Oklahoma Location within the United States
- Location: Courthouse Sq., Poteau, Oklahoma
- Coordinates: 35°3′15″N 94°37′27″W
- Area: 1 acre (0.40 ha)
- Built: 1926
- MPS: County Courthouses of Oklahoma TR
- NRHP reference No.: 84003099
- Added to NRHP: August 23, 1984

The LeFlore County Courthouse, on Courthouse Square in Poteau in Le Flore County, Oklahoma, was built in 1926. It was listed on the National Register of Historic Places in 1984.

It is a three-story yellow brick building. Large windows on its front are separated by brick pilasters. It was deemed "significant because of its importance to the county as the center of local government. Various county agencies, such as the election board and the county clerk's office, are housed in the building. It is the main location for the activities of county politics, and as such, serves a vital role within the community."
