= James E. Reynolds House =

- U.S. National Register of Historic Places
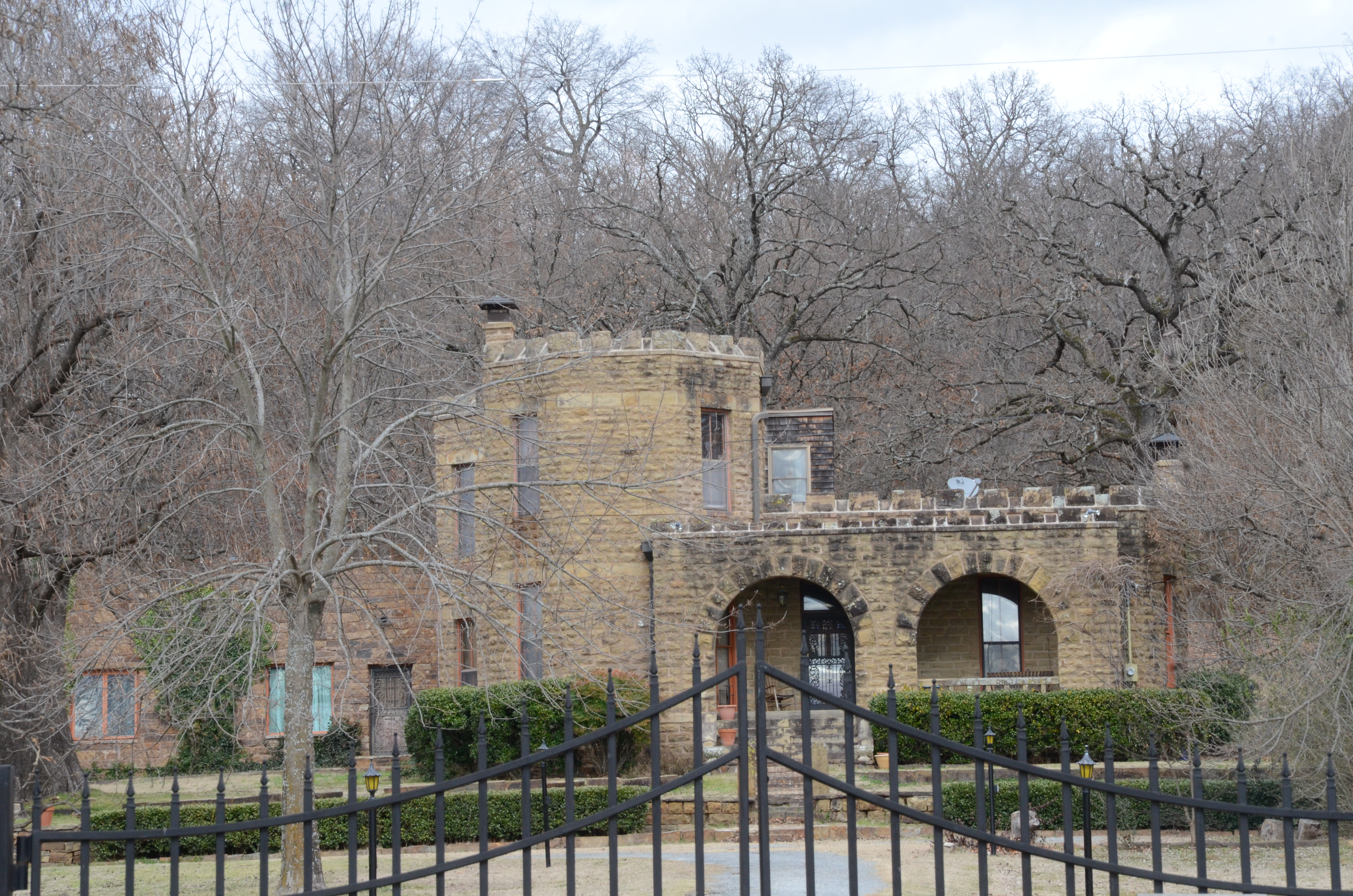

- Location within Oklahoma Location within the United States
- Location: East of Cameron, Oklahoma off State Highway 112
- Coordinates: 35°8′3″N 94°31′47″W
- Area: 3 acres (1.2 ha)
- Built by: Reynolds, James E.
- Architect: Reynolds, James E.
- NRHP reference No.: 77001093
- Added to NRHP: April 13, 1977

The James E. Reynolds House, located east of Cameron off State Highway 112 in Le Flore County, Oklahoma is a castle which was built in 1911. Also known as Reynolds Castle, it was listed on the National Register of Historic Places listings in LeFlore County, Oklahoma in 1977.

It is a 10-room stone castle built from stone quarried from a nearby hillside. The castle was the work of James E. Reynolds (1837–1920). Reynolds was a Confederate soldier in the American Civil War and successful entrepreneur and was in his words an '"unreconstructed Confederate."'
