= Overstreet House =

- U.S. National Register of Historic Places
- Location within Oklahoma Location within the United States
- Location: Off U.S. Highway 59 northwest of Cowlington, Oklahoma
- Coordinates: 35°19′6″N 94°45′47″W
- Area: 5 acres (2.0 ha)
- Built: 1891
- Architectural style: Victorian
- NRHP reference No.: 80004285
- Added to NRHP: November 25, 1980

The Overstreet House, near Cowlington, Oklahoma is a frame house which was built in 1891. It was listed on the National Register of Historic Places in 1980.

It was home of T.G. Overstreet who came from Springfield, Missouri to the Short Mountain area in the Indian Territory in the early 1870s. Eventually he built a farming and ranching business with more than 3,000 cattle and hundreds of other livestock on 3,000 acres (12 km^{2}). He died at age 93 and is buried in the family cemetery nearby.

The house includes some elements of Victorian or possibly Italianate architecture. It includes four contributing buildings on 5 acres (2.0 ha).
