= Twyman Park =

- U.S. National Register of Historic Places
- U.S. Historic district
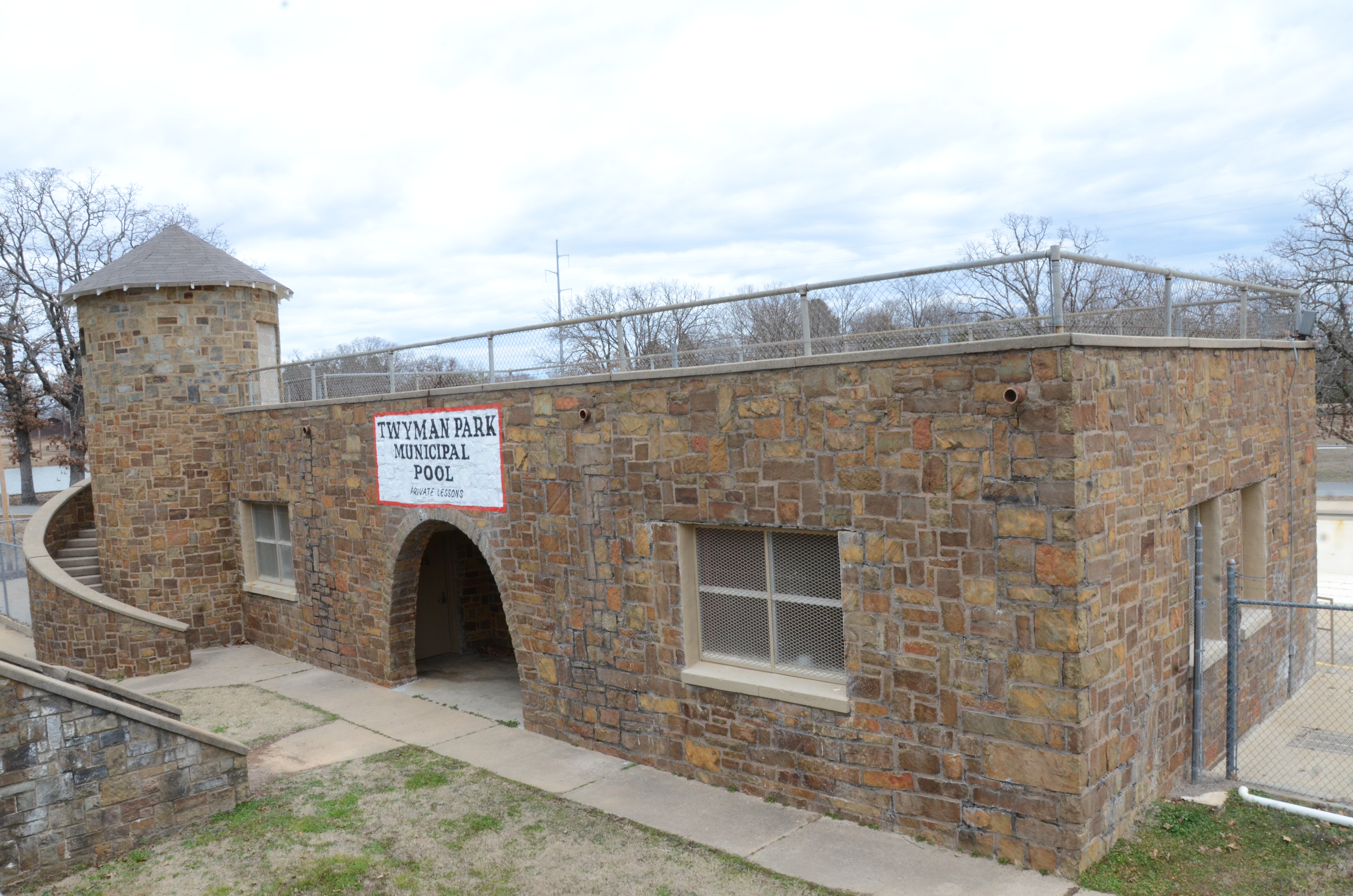

- Location within Oklahoma Location within the United States
- Nearest city: Poteau, Oklahoma
- Coordinates: 35.038611°N 94.629444°W
- Area: 20 acres (8.1 ha)
- Built: 1937
- Built by: Works Progress Administration
- Architectural style: Romanesque
- MPS: WPA Public Bldgs., Recreational Facilities and Cemetery Improvements in Southeastern Oklahoma, 1935--1943 TR
- NRHP reference No.: 88001402
- Added to NRHP: September 8, 1988

Twyman Park, on West Street in Poteau in Le Flore County, Oklahoma, has structures built in a Works Progress Administration project in 1937. It was listed on the National Register of Historic Places in 1988.

The listed area is 20 acres (8.1 ha) in size and has two contributing buildings and four contributing structures.

It includes:

- Two 24 by 30 feet (7.3 m × 9.1 m) picnic pavilions,
- Swimming pool (120 by 60 feet (37 m × 18 m) and bath house,
- Caretaker's cottage,
- Stone fence, and a
- Stone-lined drainage ditch
