= Hodgen, Oklahoma =

- Unincorporated community
- Location within Oklahoma Location within the United States
- Coordinates: 34°50′26″N 94°38′02″W
- Country: United States
- State: Oklahoma
- County: Le Flore

Area
  - Total: 0.75 sq mi (1.95 km^{2})
  - Land: 0.75 sq mi (1.95 km^{2})
  - Water: 0 sq mi (0.00 km^{2})
- Elevation: 541 ft (165 m)

Population (2020)
  - Total: 62
  - Density: 82.2/sq mi (31.75/km^{2})
- Time zone: UTC-6 (Central (CST))
  - Summer (DST): UTC-5 (CDT)
- FIPS code: 40-35150
- GNIS feature ID: 2805323

Hodgen is an unincorporated community in Le Flore County, Oklahoma, United States. As of the 2020 census, Hodgen had a population of 62. The post office was established on April 25, 1910.

Hodgen (formerly Hodgens) was named for James M. Hodgens, a railroad official.

== Geography ==
=== Climate ===
Climate data for Hodgen, Oklahoma
Month	Jan	Feb	Mar	Apr	May	Jun	Jul	Aug	Sep	Oct	Nov	Dec	Year
Mean daily maximum °F (°C)	50.9 (10.5)	55.3 (12.9)	64.4 (18.0)	74 (23)	80.8 (27.1)	88.3 (31.3)	93.9 (34.4)	93 (34)	85.1 (29.5)	75.7 (24.3)	63.3 (17.4)	53.8 (12.1)	73.2 (22.9)
Mean daily minimum °F (°C)	22.2 (−5.4)	26.5 (−3.1)	35.8 (2.1)	46.3 (7.9)	54 (12)	61.9 (16.6)	65.6 (18.7)	64.2 (17.9)	58.1 (14.5)	45.7 (7.6)	35.6 (2.0)	26.7 (−2.9)	45.2 (7.3)
Average precipitation inches (mm)	2.6 (66)	3.1 (79)	4.6 (120)	4.5 (110)	6.7 (170)	4 (100)	3.8 (97)	3.2 (81)	4.6 (120)	4.4 (110)	4.1 (100)	3.6 (91)	49.1 (1,250)
Source 1: weather.com
Source 2: Weatherbase.com

== Demographics ==
Historical population
Census	Pop.	Note	%±
2020	62		—
U.S. Decennial Census

=== 2020 census ===
As of the 2020 census, Hodgen had a population of 62. The median age was 42.3 years. 24.2% of residents were under the age of 18 and 22.6% of residents were 65 years of age or older. For every 100 females there were 129.6 males, and for every 100 females age 18 and over there were 113.6 males age 18 and over.

0.0% of residents lived in urban areas, while 100.0% lived in rural areas.

There were 21 households in Hodgen, of which 38.1% had children under the age of 18 living in them. Of all households, 52.4% were married-couple households, 0.0% were households with a male householder and no spouse or partner present, and 47.6% were households with a female householder and no spouse or partner present. About 9.5% of all households were made up of individuals and 4.8% had someone living alone who was 65 years of age or older.

There were 37 housing units, of which 43.2% were vacant. The homeowner vacancy rate was 0.0% and the rental vacancy rate was 0.0%.

Racial composition as of the 2020 census
Race	Number	Percent
White	40	64.5%
Black or African American	1	1.6%
American Indian and Alaska Native	14	22.6%
Asian	0	0.0%
Native Hawaiian and Other Pacific Islander	0	0.0%
Some other race	1	1.6%
Two or more races	6	9.7%
Hispanic or Latino (of any race)	1	1.6%
