= Tucker School (Spiro, Oklahoma) =

- U.S. National Register of Historic Places
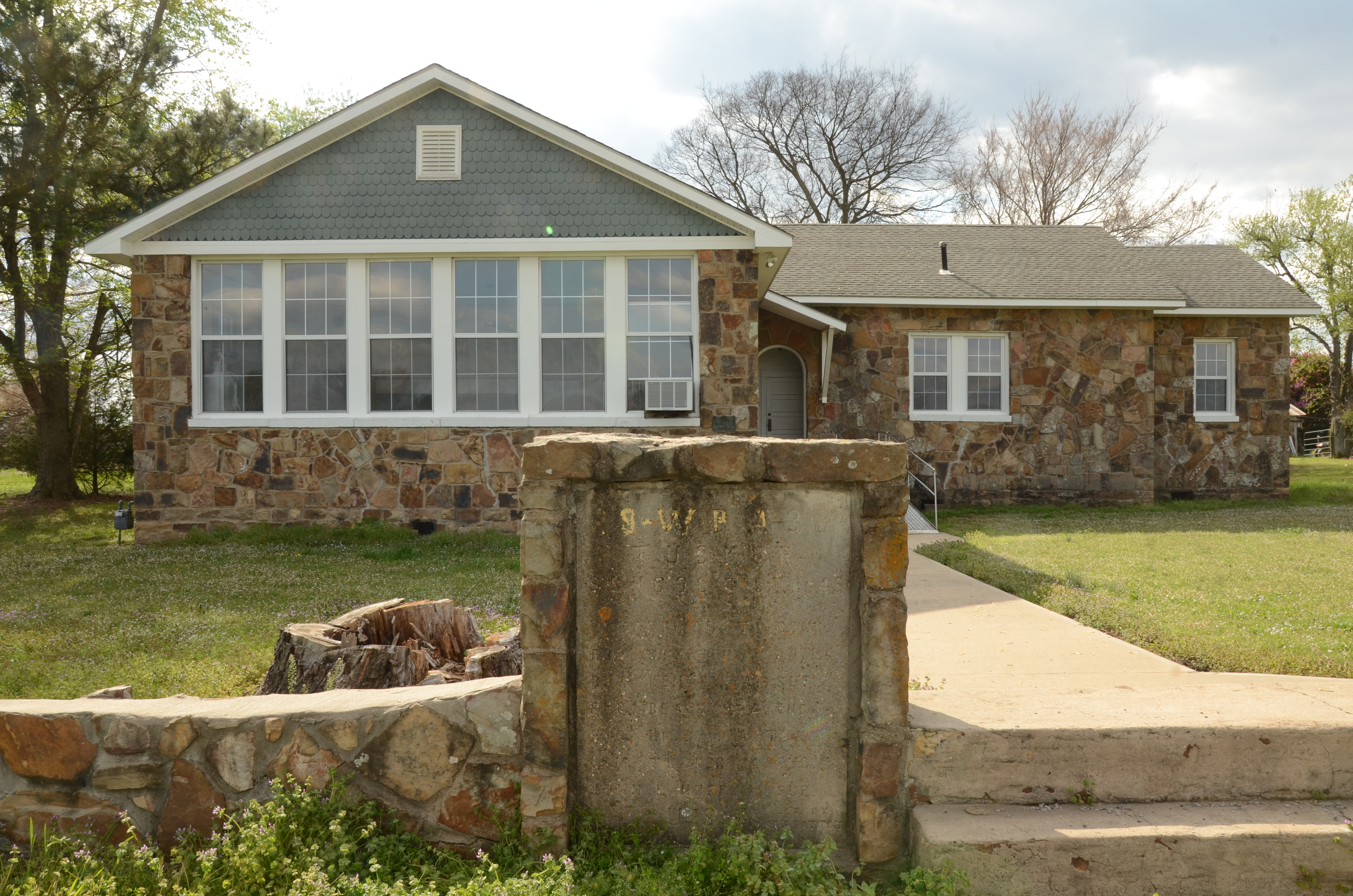

- Location within Oklahoma Location within the United States
- Location: Off U.S. Route 59, near Spiro, Oklahoma
- Coordinates: 35°17′56″N 94°44′5″W
- Area: 1 acre (0.40 ha)
- Built: 1937
- Built by: Works Progress Administration
- Architect: Okla. State Dept. of Education
- MPS: WPA Public Bldgs., Recreational Facilities and Cemetery Improvements in Southeastern Oklahoma, 1935--1943 TR
- NRHP reference No.: 88001407
- Added to NRHP: September 8, 1988

The Tucker School was a three-room schoolhouse built in 1937 as a Works Progress Administration project in a rural area outside of Spiro in LeFlore County, Oklahoma. It was listed on the National Register of Historic Places in 1988.

It is a one-story L-shaped stone building, with main part 69 by 28 feet (21.0 m × 8.5 m) and an 11 by 30 feet (3.4 m × 9.1 m) extension. It has a stepped gable roof with intersecting gables. Its front entrance is behind an arch. Its design was from an Oklahoma State Department of Education pattern book. Its NRHP nomination notes that it

is an excellent example of a three room structure that has been preserved without alteration over the years. Within the rural community of which it is a part, the building is unique architecturally in terms of type, style, scale, materials and workmanship. That construction of it also provided work for laborers long on relief rolls, giving them economic security and self esteem, makes it especially significant, as too does the fact that the building provided an impetus for modern education in a rather remote and isolated area.

== Gallery ==
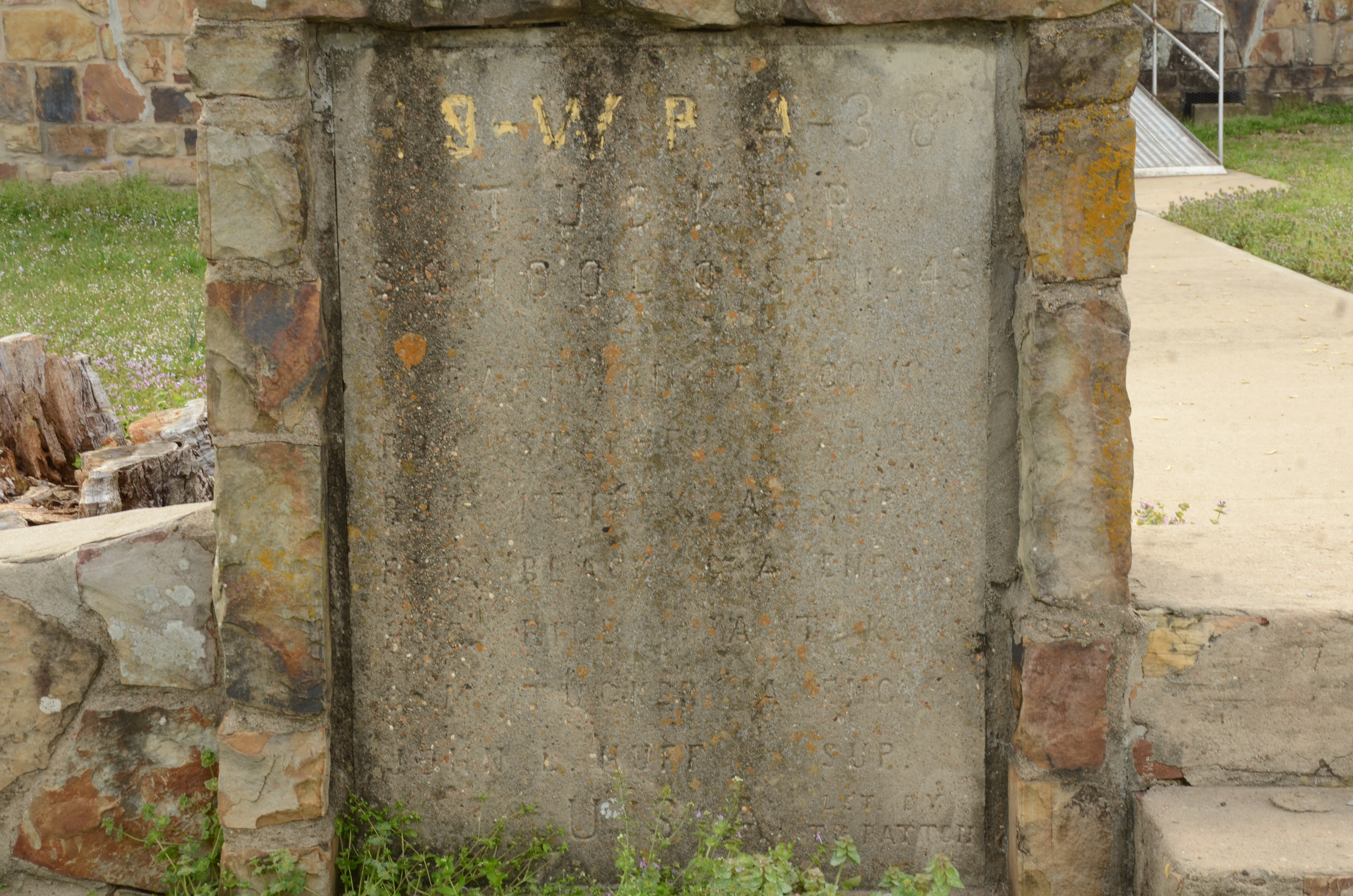
Stone entrance monument (left)

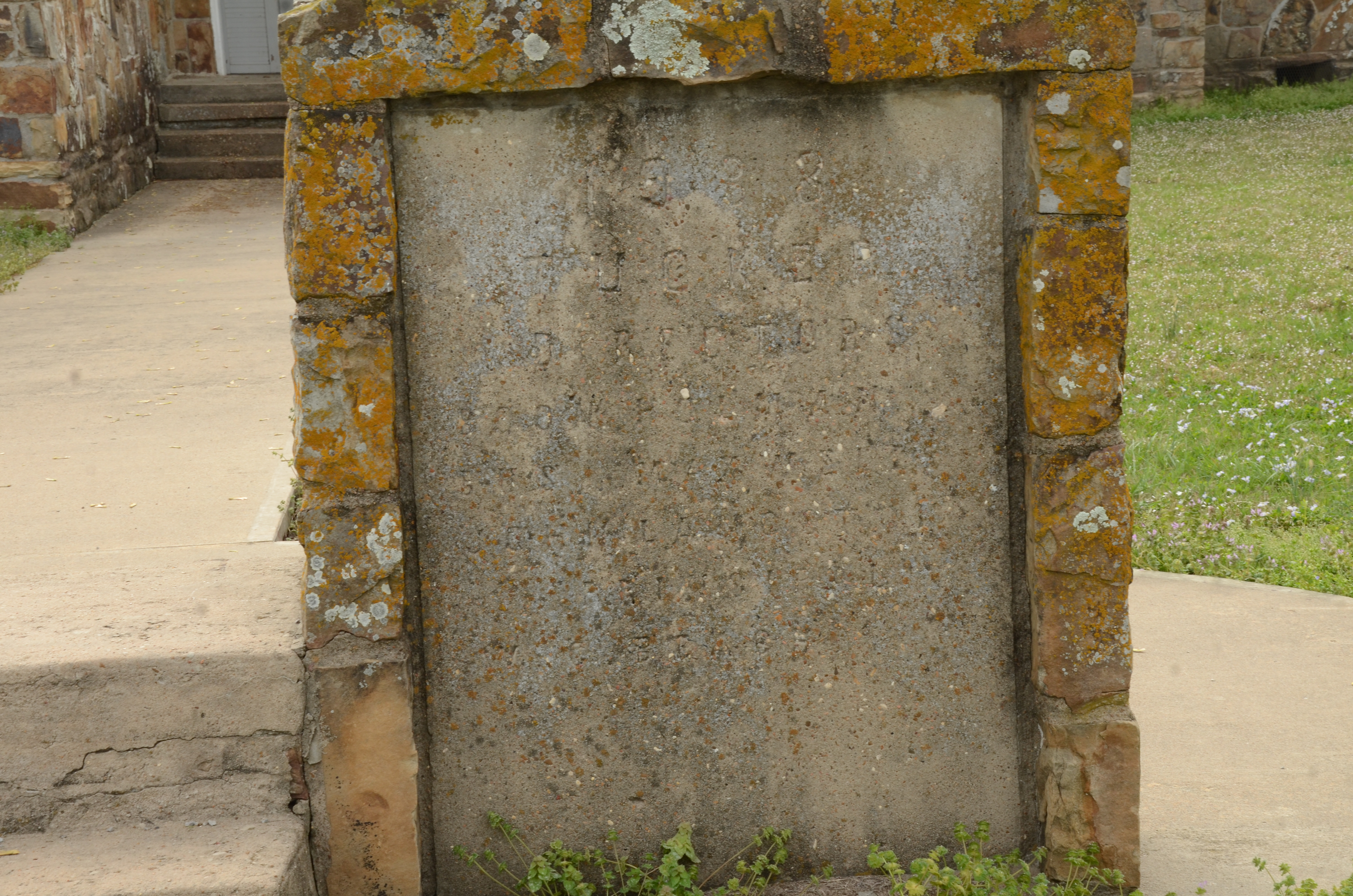
Stone entrance monument (right)
