= 1877 survey marker 48 =

Boundary marker in the United States

- State Line Marker
- U.S. National Register of Historic Places
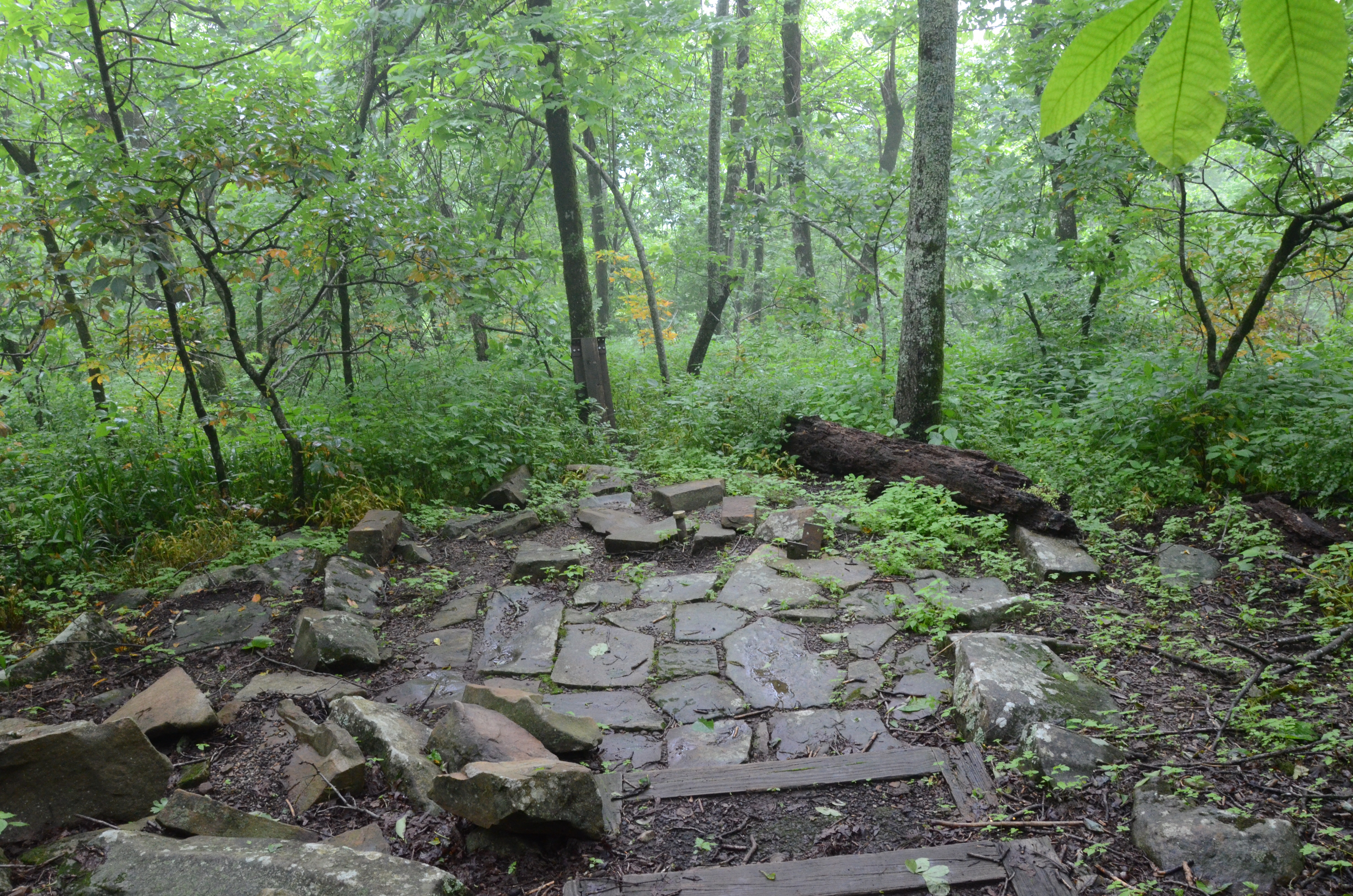
- The marker as it appeared in May 2015.

- Location within Arkansas Location within the United States
- Nearest city: Mena, Arkansas
- Coordinates: 34°41′38″N 94°27′19″W
- Area: less than one acre
- Built: 1877
- Architect: U.S. Army Engineers
- NRHP reference No.: 76000448
- Added to NRHP: November 18, 1976

The State Line Marker is a historic boundary marker on the state line between Arkansas and Oklahoma. It is located down a path a short way north of a parking area on Talimena Scenic Drive in Ouachita National Forest, about 17 miles (27 km) northwest of Mena, Arkansas. The marker was originally an octagonal cast iron pipe, with the legend "48 M" on the north face (signifying its marking of the 48th mile), "1877" on the south side (the year of the marker's erection), "ARK" (for Arkansas) on the east side, and "CHOC" (for Choctaw Territory) on the west side. The pipe was mounted in a stone and mortar base installed by the United States Forest Service in 1974. The marker was placed in 1877 following a series of controversial surveys to demarcate the border between Arkansas and what was then Indian Territory.

The marker was listed on the National Register of Historic Places in 1976. This marker was one of the few surviving markers from this survey that is accessible to the public.

== See also ==
- National Register of Historic Places listings in Polk County, Arkansas
- National Register of Historic Places listings in Le Flore County, Oklahoma
