= Trahern's Station =

Overland Mail stagecoach stop in Oklahoma

- U.S. National Register of Historic Places
- Location within Oklahoma Location within the United States
- Location: 9 mi. W of Shadypoint, Oklahoma
- Coordinates: 35°7′10″N 94°48′13″W
- Area: 1 acre (0.40 ha)
- Built: 1858
- NRHP reference No.: 72001073
- Added to NRHP: April 25, 1972

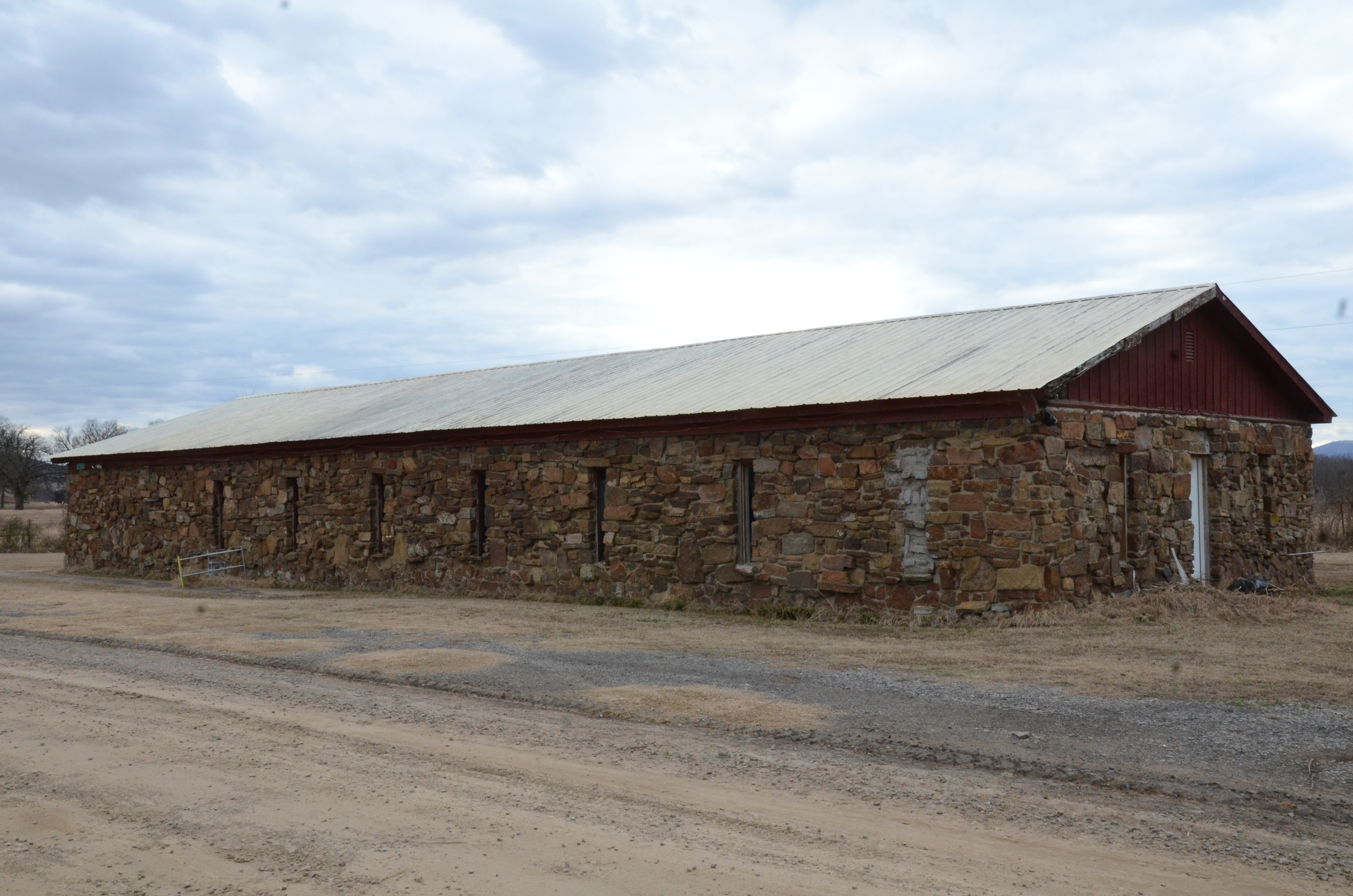
Trahern's Station building, an historic stagecoach stop

Trahern's Station was a stage stand on the old Butterfield Overland Mail route in Indian Territory. It was located about 9 miles west of what is now the town of Shadypoint in Le Flore County, Oklahoma. The station was named for Judge James N. Trahern, the stage agent. Trahern was a Choctaw Indian and a long-time county judge for Skullyville County, Choctaw Nation.It is now a church.

Trahern's Station was added to the National Register of Historic Places (#72001073) on April 25, 1972.
