= Peter Conser House =

- U.S. National Register of Historic Places
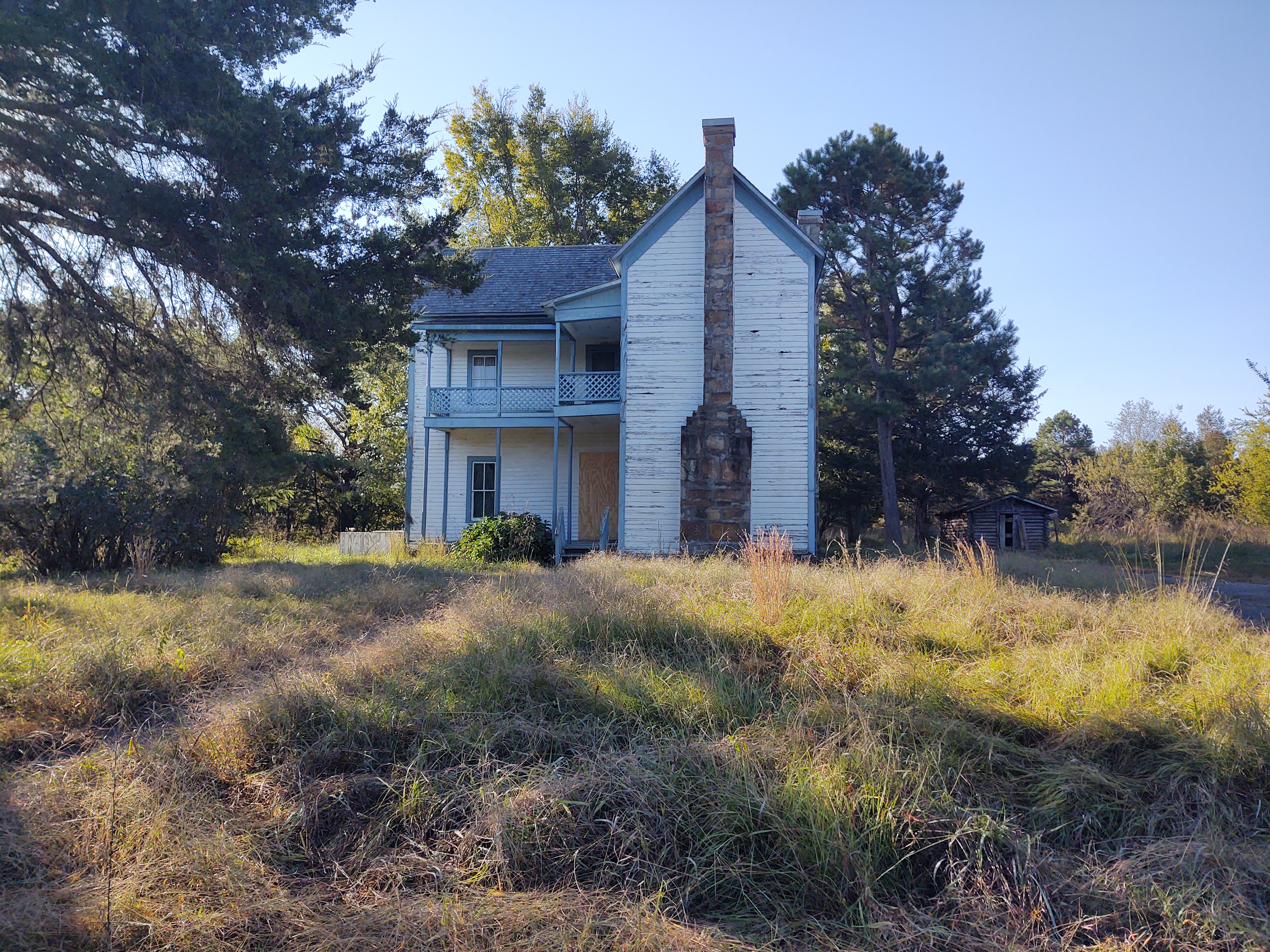

- Location within Oklahoma Location within the United States
- Location: 47114 Conser Creek Rd., Heavener, Oklahoma
- Coordinates: 34°50′21″N 94°41′21″W
- Area: 4 acres (1.6 ha)
- Built: 1894
- NRHP reference No.: 71000665
- Added to NRHP: June 21, 1971

The Peter Conser House, in or near Heavener, Oklahoma and/or Hodgen, Oklahoma, was built in 1894 and was the home of Peter Conser from then until his death in 1934. It was listed on the National Register of Historic Places in 1971.

The listing included two contributing buildings on 4 acres (1.6 ha).

Peter Conser (c.1850-1934) was a Choctaw Nation lawman, the Chief Lighthorseman of the Mosholatubbee District, which is roughly equivalent to being county sheriff in the Choctaw Nation's system of law and order. He fought in the American Civil War as a Confederate soldier, and came to this area after, building a log house which burned in 1870 or 1875. He later built a second house, and then the present house in 1894 using a door and some rafters from the previous ones.
