= Skullyville County Jail =

- U.S. National Register of Historic Places
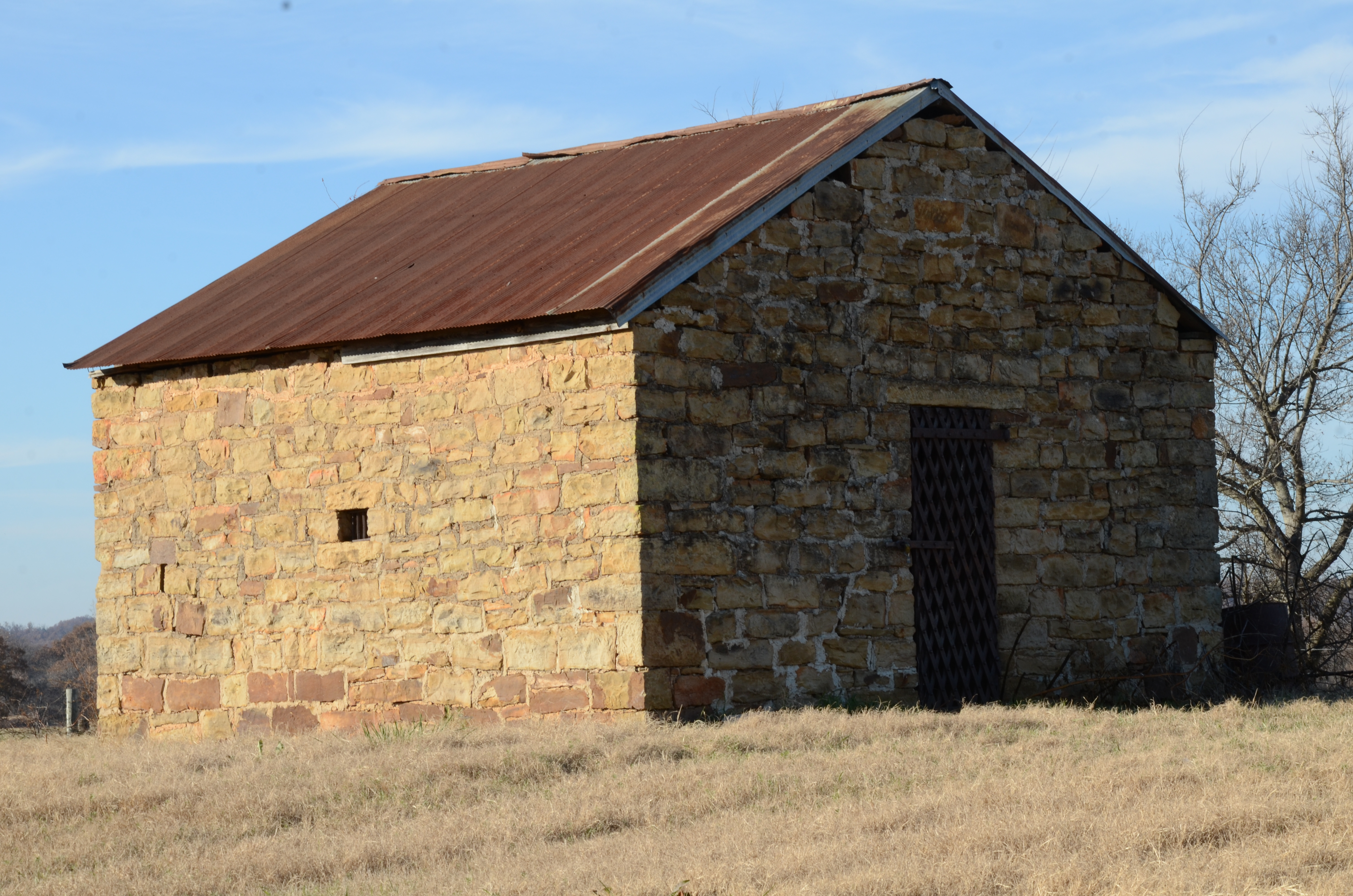

- Location within Oklahoma Location within the United States
- Nearest city: Panama, Oklahoma
- Coordinates: 35°10′25″N 94°43′4″W
- Area: less than one acre
- Built: 1907
- Built by: Fannon, Eliza
- NRHP reference No.: 80004286
- Added to NRHP: November 6, 1980

The Skullyville County Jail, located west of Panama in Le Flore County, Oklahoma, was built in 1907. It was listed on the National Register of Historic Places in 1980.

It is a small building with two-foot-thick sandstone walls, and was built by contractor Elija W. Fannin. Its only ventilation is by its doorway and by a small window, 12 by 6 inches (30 cm × 15 cm) in size, which has two sets of iron bars in it. Its door is a lattice of iron bars, which cost $55.65 from the firm of Sengel and Shulte. The jail has its original dirt floor, but has a newer roof, now covered in corrugated tin. It is significant as the only remaining artifact of the Skullyville County Government in the Choctaw Nation; a courthouse located to the north of the jail was burned in 1949.

It has also been known as Skullyville County Jail, Choctaw Nation.
