= Williams School (Cameron, Oklahoma) =

- U.S. National Register of Historic Places
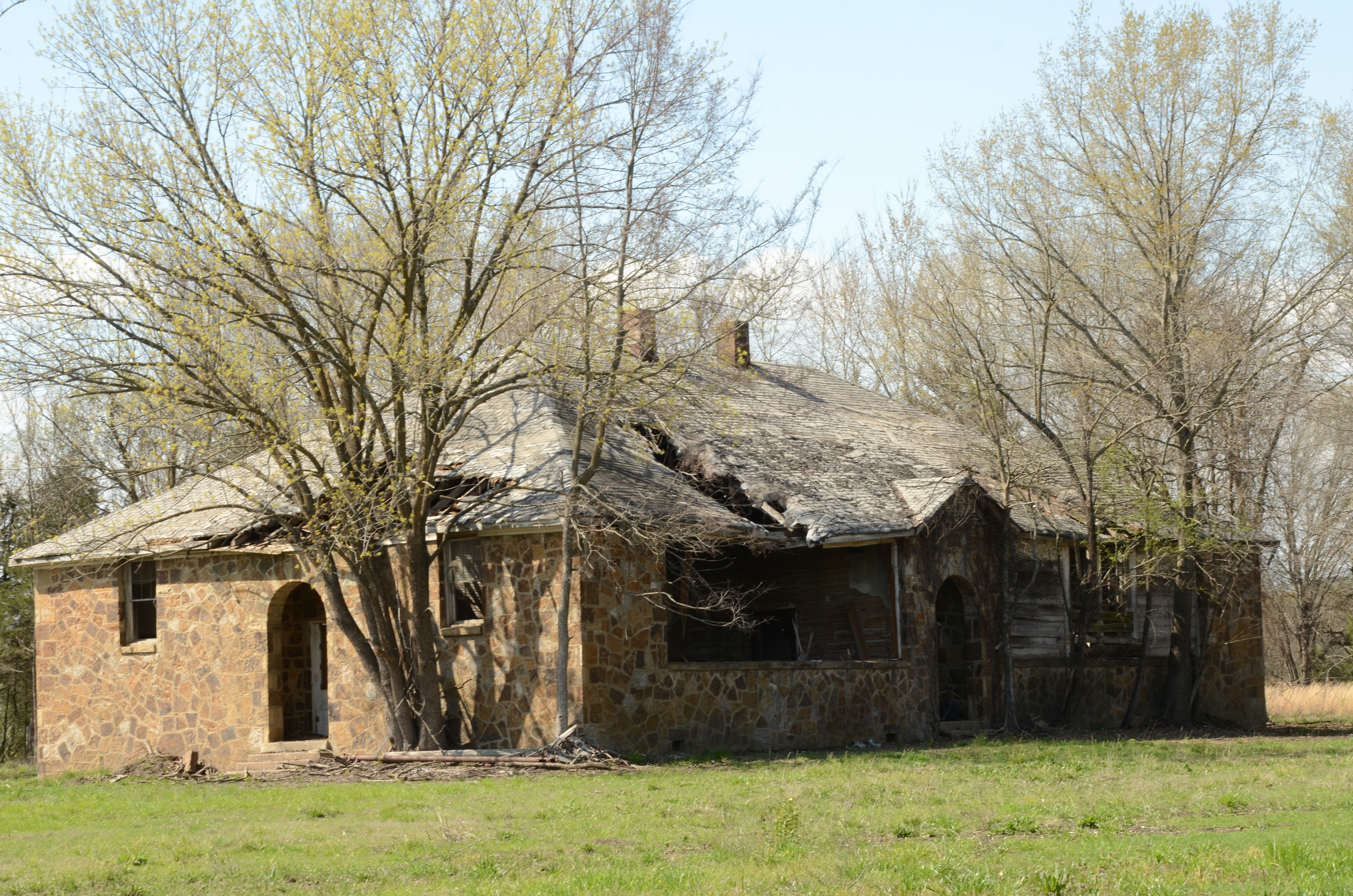

- Location within Oklahoma Location within the United States
- Nearest city: Cameron, Oklahoma
- Coordinates: 35°9′59″N 94°32′59″W
- Built: 1936
- Built by: Works Progress Administration
- Architect: Okla. State Dept. of Education
- MPS: WPA Public Bldgs., Recreational Facilities and Cemetery Improvements in Southeastern Oklahoma, 1935--1943 TR
- NRHP reference No.: 88001408
- Added to NRHP: September 8, 1988

Williams School in Cameron, Oklahoma was a Works Progress Administration project that was built in 1936. It was listed on the National Register of Historic Places in 1988.

It was deemed significant for its character (in architecture), for its construction having provided jobs for destitute laborers "close to the edge of starvation", for providing a better learning environment, and for helping "to instill a sense of pride within the community."

It is a one-story hipped-roof 401-by-72-foot (122 by 22 m) building with native sandstone walls.

Its design is from an Oklahoma State Department of Education pattern book.

== See also ==
- Summerfield School (Oklahoma)
