= Cowlington, Oklahoma =

- Town
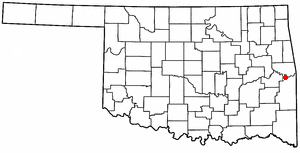
- Location of Cowlington, Oklahoma
- Coordinates: 35°18′38″N 94°47′16″W
- Country: United States
- State: Oklahoma
- County: LeFlore

Area
  - Total: 0.91 sq mi (2.36 km^{2})
  - Land: 0.91 sq mi (2.36 km^{2})
  - Water: 0 sq mi (0.00 km^{2})
- Elevation: 509 ft (155 m)

Population (2020)
  - Total: 109
  - Density: 119.6/sq mi (46.16/km^{2})
- Time zone: UTC-6 (Central (CST))
  - Summer (DST): UTC-5 (CDT)
- FIPS code: 40-17850
- GNIS feature ID: 2412380

Cowlington is a town in LeFlore County, Oklahoma. As of the 2020 census, Cowlington had a population of 109.

== History ==
The fertile soil of the Arkansas River bottom land, in which the present town of Cowlington is located, attracted settlement as soon as the Choctaw tribe migrated to Indian Territory. Many of these inhabitants fled during the American Civil War, returning only when hostilities had ceased. White men also came after the war and began leasing land. Among these were Coke and Fowler Cowling. A settlement formed that was informally known as Short Mountain. A post office named Cowlington, to honor the Cowling family, opened in the community in 1884.

At the time of its founding, Cowlington was located in the Moshulatubbee District of the Choctaw Nation.

Cowlington's economy was largely based on agricultural services. Area production included wheat, potatoes, cotton, and livestock. The town prospered because of its access to the steamboat trade on the river. Two floods along the Arkansas River, in 1898 and 1904, devastated the local economy, but the town recovered each time. However, railroads built lines through LeFlore County in the late 1800s, and began to supplant the steamboats. Fowler Cowlington tried to convince some of the railroads to build a track through Cowlington, but failed in this effort. More residents began to move away. (Note: Even Fowler Cowlington decided to sell his land and moved to Pittsburg County, Oklahoma. The onset of the Great Depression caused many other people to move away, as well.)

Construction of the Robert S. Kerr Lock and Dam between 1964 and 1970 coincided with a large increase in Cowlington's population to a high of 751 residents at the 1970 U. S. Census. Tourism became a significant portion of the local economy, although the population declined again after construction was completed.

== Geography ==
Cowlington is located 2 miles (3.2 km) south of Robert S. Kerr Lock and Dam (part of the McClellan-Kerr Arkansas River Navigation System). The town is also 10.5 miles (16.9 km) south of Sallisaw.

According to the United States Census Bureau, the town has a total area of 0.9 square miles (2.3 km^{2}), all land.

== Demographics ==
Historical population
Census	Pop.	Note	%±
1900	272		—
1910	378		39.0%
1920	344		−9.0%
1930	265		−23.0%
1940	224		−15.5%
1950	83		−62.9%
1960	74		−10.8%
1970	751		914.9%
1980	546		−27.3%
1990	756		38.5%
2000	133		−82.4%
2010	155		16.5%
2020	109		−29.7%
U.S. Decennial Census

=== 2020 census ===
As of the 2020 census, Cowlington had a population of 109. The median age was 51.2 years. 20.2% of residents were under the age of 18 and 24.8% of residents were 65 years of age or older. For every 100 females there were 87.9 males, and for every 100 females age 18 and over there were 81.2 males age 18 and over.

0.0% of residents lived in urban areas, while 100.0% lived in rural areas.

There were 48 households in Cowlington, of which 22.9% had children under the age of 18 living in them. Of all households, 50.0% were married-couple households, 18.8% were households with a male householder and no spouse or partner present, and 25.0% were households with a female householder and no spouse or partner present. About 31.3% of all households were made up of individuals and 14.6% had someone living alone who was 65 years of age or older.

There were 58 housing units, of which 17.2% were vacant. The homeowner vacancy rate was 0.0% and the rental vacancy rate was 33.3%.

Racial composition as of the 2020 census
Race	Number	Percent
White	85	78.0%
Black or African American	1	0.9%
American Indian and Alaska Native	10	9.2%
Asian	0	0.0%
Native Hawaiian and Other Pacific Islander	0	0.0%
Some other race	1	0.9%
Two or more races	12	11.0%
Hispanic or Latino (of any race)	1	0.9%

=== 2000 census ===
As of the census of 2000, there were 133 people, 55 households, and 38 families residing in the town. The population density was 145.3 inhabitants per square mile (56.1/km^{2}). There were 67 housing units at an average density of 73.2 per square mile (28.3/km^{2}). The racial makeup of the town was 74.44% White, 8.27% Native American, 3.76% from other races, and 13.53% from two or more races. Hispanic or Latino of any race were 3.76% of the population.

There were 55 households, out of which 27.3% had children under the age of 18 living with them, 52.7% were married couples living together, 9.1% had a female householder with no husband present, and 30.9% were non-families. 30.9% of all households were made up of individuals, and 16.4% had someone living alone who was 65 years of age or older. The average household size was 2.42 and the average family size was 3.03.

In the town, the population was spread out, with 27.8% under the age of 18, 7.5% from 18 to 24, 27.1% from 25 to 44, 19.5% from 45 to 64, and 18.0% who were 65 years of age or older. The median age was 36 years. For every 100 females, there were 95.6 males. For every 100 females age 18 and over, there were 95.9 males.

The median income for a household in the town was $16,591, and the median income for a family was $19,167. Males had a median income of $16,875 versus $23,125 for females. The per capita income for the town was $9,323. There were 6.3% of families and 9.6% of the population living below the poverty line, including no under eighteens and 8.7% of those over 64.
