= Old Military Road =

- U.S. National Register of Historic Places
- Location within Oklahoma Location within the United States
- Location: North of Oklahoma Highway 1, at Old Military Road picnic site, 7 miles northeast of Talihina, Oklahoma in the Ouachita National Forest
- Coordinates: 34°47′46″N 94°56′38″W
- Area: 9 acres (3.6 ha)
- Built: 1832
- Built by: War Department, Bureau of Indian Affairs
- NRHP reference No.: 76002155
- Added to NRHP: October 22, 1976

The Old Military Road site near Carey, Ohio is a segment of the historic military road built in 1832 from Fort Smith, Arkansas to Fort Towson, Oklahoma. The road facilitated commerce and development in the region, particularly in the Oklahoma Territory.

The War Department and the Bureau of Indian Affairs collaborated on the development of the road, with Captain John Stuart overseeing the project. The route was laid out by frontiersman Robert Bean, who was assisted by a young Jesse Chisholm.
