= Arkoma, Oklahoma =

- Town
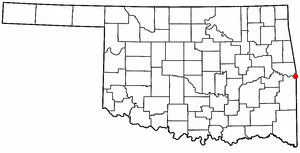
- Location of Arkoma, Oklahoma

- Location within Oklahoma Location within the United States
- Coordinates: 35°20′15″N 94°26′38″W
- Country: United States
- State: Oklahoma
- County: LeFlore

Area
  - Total: 3.52 sq mi (9.11 km^{2})
  - Land: 3.47 sq mi (9.00 km^{2})
  - Water: 0.046 sq mi (0.12 km^{2})
- Elevation: 423 ft (129 m)

Population (2020)
  - Total: 1,806
  - Density: 519.9/sq mi (200.75/km^{2})
- Time zone: UTC-6 (Central (CST))
  - Summer (DST): UTC-5 (CDT)
- ZIP code: 74901
- Area codes: 539/918
- FIPS code: 40-02650
- GNIS feature ID: 2411644
- Website: arkomaok.gov

Arkoma is a town in LeFlore County, Oklahoma, United States. As of the 2020 census, Arkoma had a population of 1,806. The name of the town is a portmanteau of Arkansas and Oklahoma, given its location on the state line between the two states. Throughout its history, Arkoma has served as a "bedroom community," with many residents commuting to work in neighboring Fort Smith, Arkansas.

== History ==
The community of Arkoma was established circa 1911 on land owned by Captain James Reynolds, a Civil War veteran who had married into the Choctaw Nation. He chose to turn his property into a suburb of Fort Smith. He built houses to rent. He persuaded the Fort Smith Light and Traction Company to construct tracks and operate an electric trolley route to his new community. The streetcar line ceased operating in 1917.

Arkoma was incorporated as a town in 1946.

== Geography ==
Arkoma is located on the same side of the Arkansas River as Fort Smith, Arkansas, and is bounded by the Poteau River to the west and north, and the Arkansas-Oklahoma state line to the east.

According to the United States Census Bureau, the town has a total area of 3.6 square miles (9.3 km^{2}), of which 3.5 square miles (9.1 km^{2}) is land and 0.1 square miles (0.26 km^{2}) (2.23%) is water.

Arkoma enjoys a temperate climate with often mild winters and hot summers.

== Demographics ==
Historical population
Census	Pop.	Note	%±
1950	1,691		—
1960	1,862		10.1%
1970	2,098		12.7%
1980	2,175		3.7%
1990	2,393		10.0%
2000	2,180		−8.9%
2010	1,989		−8.8%
2020	1,806		−9.2%
U.S. Decennial Census

=== 2020 census ===
As of the 2020 census, Arkoma had a population of 1,806. The median age was 39.2 years. 25.2% of residents were under the age of 18 and 19.4% of residents were 65 years of age or older. For every 100 females there were 94.6 males, and for every 100 females age 18 and over there were 89.5 males age 18 and over.

93.7% of residents lived in urban areas, while 6.3% lived in rural areas.

There were 729 households in Arkoma, of which 32.6% had children under the age of 18 living in them. Of all households, 36.2% were married-couple households, 21.4% were households with a male householder and no spouse or partner present, and 35.9% were households with a female householder and no spouse or partner present. About 31.9% of all households were made up of individuals and 13.7% had someone living alone who was 65 years of age or older.

There were 833 housing units, of which 12.5% were vacant. The homeowner vacancy rate was 1.8% and the rental vacancy rate was 9.1%.

Racial composition as of the 2020 census
Race	Number	Percent
White	1,380	76.4%
Black or African American	14	0.8%
American Indian and Alaska Native	137	7.6%
Asian	3	0.2%
Native Hawaiian and Other Pacific Islander	0	0.0%
Some other race	7	0.4%
Two or more races	265	14.7%
Hispanic or Latino (of any race)	65	3.6%

=== 2010 census ===
As of the census of 2010, there were 1,989 people living in the town. The population density was 620.7 inhabitants per square mile (239.7/km^{2}). There were 975 housing units at an average density of 277.6 units per square mile (107.2 units/km^{2}). The racial makeup of the town was 89.22% White, 0.41% African American, 5.78% Native American, 0.32% Asian, 0.87% from other races, and 3.39% from two or more races. Hispanic or Latino of any race were 1.83% of the population.

There were 877 households, out of which 28.4% had children under the age of 18 living with them, 50.4% were married couples living together, 13.5% had a female householder with no husband present, and 32.0% were non-families. 28.6% of all households were made up of individuals, and 10.5% had someone living alone who was 65 years of age or older. The average household size was 2.43 and the average family size was 2.97.

In the town, the population was spread out, with 24.6% under the age of 18, 8.8% from 18 to 24, 25.9% from 25 to 44, 25.8% from 45 to 64, and 15.0% who were 65 years of age or older. The median age was 38 years. For every 100 females, there were 96.8 males. For every 100 females age 18 and over, there were 90.9 males.

The median income for a household in the town was $23,718, and the median income for a family was $31,500. Males had a median income of $24,200 versus $17,104 for females. The per capita income for the town was $13,467. About 17.0% of families and 20.1% of the population were below the poverty line, including 26.8% of those under age 18 and 18.0% of those age 65 or over.
