= Summerfield School (Oklahoma) =

- U.S. National Register of Historic Places
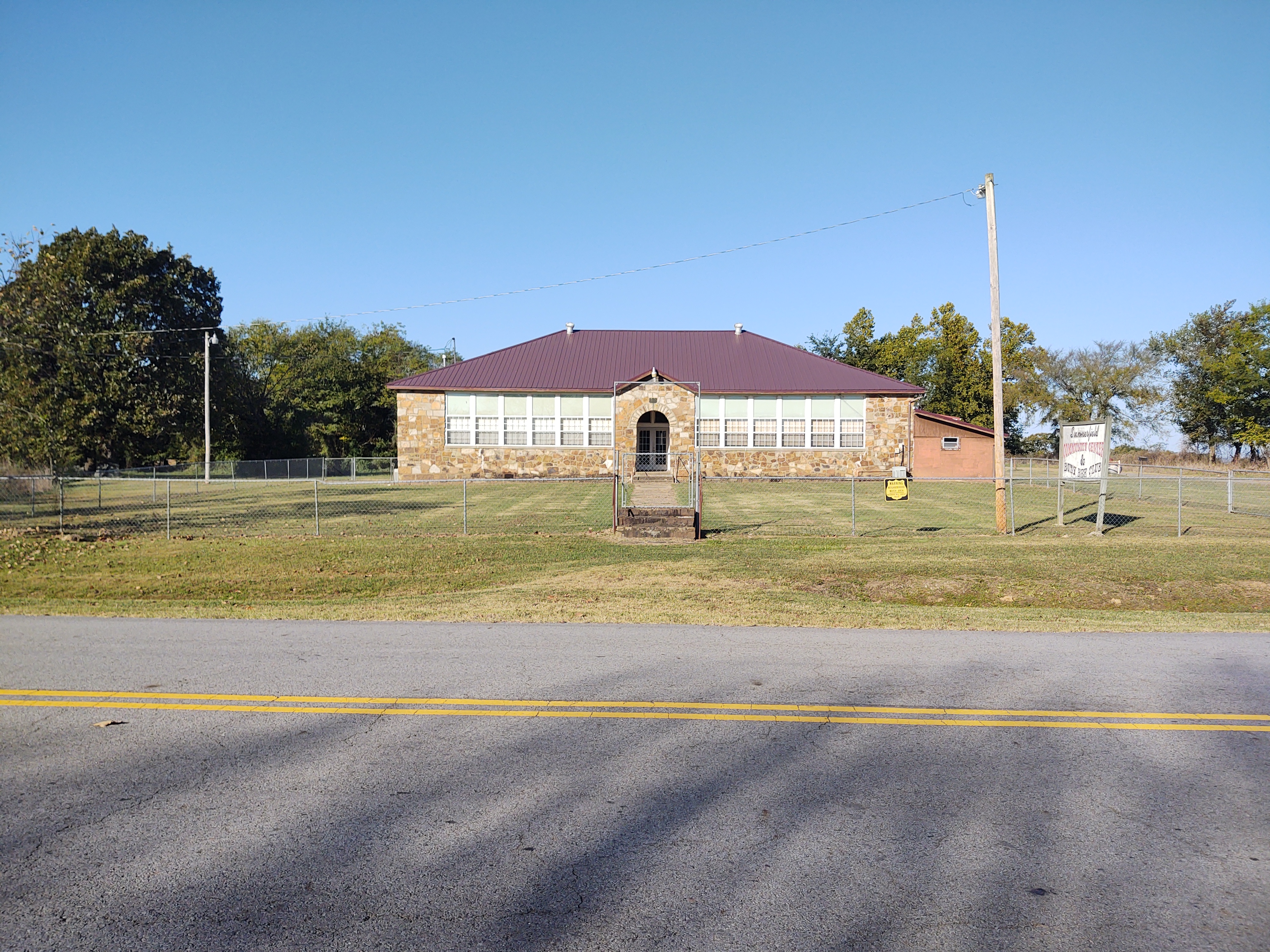
- Location: 34518 Reichert-Summerfield Rd, Summerfield, Oklahoma
- Coordinates: 34.8971°N 94.8666°W
- Area: less than one acre
- Built: 1937
- Built by: Works Progress Administration
- Architect: Okla. State Dept. of Education
- MPS: WPA Public Bldgs., Recreational Facilities and Cemetery Improvements in Southeastern Oklahoma, 1935-1943 TR
- NRHP reference No.: 88001406
- Added to NRHP: September 8, 1988

The Summerfield School, located off US 271 in Summerfield, Oklahoma, U.S., was built in 1937 as a Works Progress Administration project. It was listed on the National Register of Historic Places in 1988.

It is now known as "Summerfield Community Center & Buzy Bee Club", where local gatherings (birthdays, weddings, etc.) are held as well as a weekly Senior Citizens quilting club. It is managed mostly by local resident Mollie Turner.

It is a single-story hipped-roof four-room 421-by-72-foot (128 by 22 m) building built of native sandstone. Its design is from an Oklahoma State Dept. of Education pattern book.

It was deemed significant because its construction provided jobs, for providing a better learning environment for children, and for its architectural uniqueness within its community.

== See also ==
- Williams School (Cameron, Oklahoma)
