= Spiro, Oklahoma =

- Town
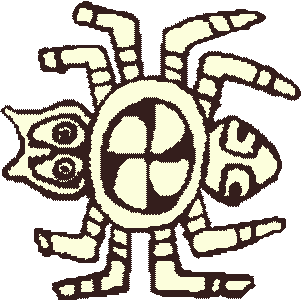
- Spider engraved on shell, from Spiro Mounds, near the town of Spiro.

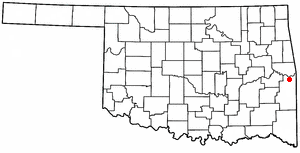
- Location of Spiro, Oklahoma
- Coordinates: 35°14′28″N 94°37′25″W
- Country: United States
- State: Oklahoma
- County: Le Flore

Area
  - Total: 2.43 sq mi (6.30 km^{2})
  - Land: 2.35 sq mi (6.08 km^{2})
  - Water: 0.085 sq mi (0.22 km^{2})
- Elevation: 489 ft (149 m)

Population (2020)
  - Total: 2,102
  - Density: 895.2/sq mi (345.62/km^{2})
- Time zone: UTC-6 (CST)
  - Summer (DST): UTC-5 (CDT)
- ZIP code: 74959
- Area codes: 539/918
- FIPS code: 40-69350
- GNIS feature ID: 2413316
- Website: visitspirooklahoma.com

Spiro is a town in Le Flore County, Oklahoma, United States. As of the 2020 census, Spiro had a population of 2,102.

Developed as a railroad station in an agricultural area in the late 19th century, the small town is notable for its proximity to the Spiro Mounds, a Mississippian culture center that was active from about 900 to 1450 CE that was part of a culture in Eastern Oklahoma and Western Arkansas. Today, the 80-acre site, with several earthwork mounds, is preserved as Oklahoma's only State Archeological Park and one of North America's most important archaeological sites. It is the westernmost site of the expansive Mississippian culture, which had associated centers through the Mississippi and tributary river valleys.

== History ==
In 1895 and 1896, the Kansas City, Pittsburg and Gulf Railroad (later owned by the Kansas City Southern Railroad) established a station at the present site of Spiro, which connected the area to the city of Fort Smith, Arkansas. This railroad access attracted residents from the nearby town of Skullyville, and Spiro soon developed as the principal town in this area. The town population was 543 in 1900.

A post office was established at Spiro, Indian Territory on September 21, 1898. At the time of its founding, Spiro was located in Skullyville County, a part of the Moshulatubbee District of the Choctaw Nation.

Several accounts differ as to how the post office was named. One claims that Spiro was the maiden name of the first postmistress. Another claims it was the maiden name of the mother of a Fort Smith banker. According to the Oklahoma Historical Society, Spiro was named after Celia Spiro, wife of an Oklahoma banker, Iser H Nakdimen. He founded the City National Bank in Ft. Smith, Arkansas, and the First National Bank in Muldrow, Oklahoma.

Cotton was an important cash crop. In 1901, Spiro had three cotton yards and one cotton gin. By 1910, there were three cotton gins and the population had grown to 1,173. As cotton cultivation became more mechanized, labor needs declined. The Great Depression of the 1930s took the heart out of the market. Timber harvesting and processing and livestock became important industries in the region. The population declined to 969 in 1930, as agricultural workers migrated to other areas for jobs. It rebounded to 1,365 by 1950 as the economy grew.

=== 1976 tornado ===
On March 26, 1976, the town was struck by an F5 tornado, the highest level on the Fujita scale, resulting in two deaths.

== Geography ==
Spiro is located 3 miles (4.8 km) south of the Arkansas River, 17 miles (27 km) southwest of Fort Smith, Arkansas and 10 miles (16 km) west of the Oklahoma-Arkansas border.

According to the United States Census Bureau, the town has a total area of 2.2 square miles (5.7 km^{2}), of which 0.1 sq mi (0.26 km^{2}) (3.18%) is covered by water.

== Demographics ==
Historical population
Census	Pop.	Note	%±
1900	543		—
1910	1,173		116.0%
1920	1,162		−0.9%
1930	969		−16.6%
1940	1,041		7.4%
1950	1,365		31.1%
1960	1,450		6.2%
1970	2,057		41.9%
1980	2,221		8.0%
1990	2,146		−3.4%
2000	2,227		3.8%
2010	2,164		−2.8%
2020	2,102		−2.9%
U.S. Decennial Census

=== 2020 census ===
As of the 2020 census, Spiro had a population of 2,102. The median age was 40.6 years. 24.1% of residents were under the age of 18 and 20.5% of residents were 65 years of age or older. For every 100 females there were 95.0 males, and for every 100 females age 18 and over there were 87.0 males age 18 and over.

0.0% of residents lived in urban areas, while 100.0% lived in rural areas.

There were 842 households in Spiro, of which 30.2% had children under the age of 18 living in them. Of all households, 38.8% were married-couple households, 19.4% were households with a male householder and no spouse or partner present, and 35.6% were households with a female householder and no spouse or partner present. About 33.4% of all households were made up of individuals and 18.3% had someone living alone who was 65 years of age or older.

There were 989 housing units, of which 14.9% were vacant. The homeowner vacancy rate was 4.4% and the rental vacancy rate was 10.9%.

Racial composition as of the 2020 census
Race	Number	Percent
White	1,473	70.1%
Black or African American	88	4.2%
American Indian and Alaska Native	304	14.5%
Asian	11	0.5%
Native Hawaiian and Other Pacific Islander	0	0.0%
Some other race	17	0.8%
Two or more races	209	9.9%
Hispanic or Latino (of any race)	70	3.3%

=== 2000 census ===
As of the census of 2000, there were 2,227 people, 875 households, and 587 families residing in the town. The population density was 1,049.5 inhabitants per square mile (405.2/km^{2}). There were 992 housing units at an average density of 467.5 per square mile (180.5/km^{2}). The racial makeup of the town was 80.47% White, 5.21% African American, 6.11% Native American, 0.18% Asian, 1.35% from other races, and 6.69% from two or more races. Hispanic or Latino of any race were 2.51% of the population.

There were 875 households, out of which 30.6% had children under the age of 18 living with them, 47.0% were married couples living together, 15.8% had a female householder with no husband present, and 32.8% were non-families. 30.2% of all households were made up of individuals, and 13.4% had someone living alone who was 65 years of age or older. The average household size was 2.46 and the average family size was 3.03.

In the town, the population was spread out, with 26.9% under the age of 18, 9.1% from 18 to 24, 26.6% from 25 to 44, 20.7% from 45 to 64, and 16.7% who were 65 years of age or older. The median age was 36 years. For every 100 females, there were 81.8 males. For every 100 females age 18 and over, there were 78.8 males.

The median income for a household in the town was $18,241, and the median income for a family was $25,556. Males had a median income of $23,716 versus $16,694 for females. The per capita income for the town was $11,195. About 23.2% of families and 29.3% of the population were below the poverty line, including 41.8% of those under age 18 and 29.9% of those age 65 or over.

== Notable people ==
- Bill Blankenship – football coach, born in Spiro in 1956
- Albert E. Brumley (1905–1977) – gospel songwriter and publisher, born in Spiro in 1905
- Henry Burris – professional Canadian football player, born in Spiro in 1975
- Ryan Franklin (b. 1973) – Major League Baseball pitcher, grew up in Spiro
- Dallas Frazier – Bakersfield Sound singer-songwriter, born in Spiro in 1939
- Rod Shoate – professional football player for the New England Patriots
