= Poteau, Oklahoma =

- City
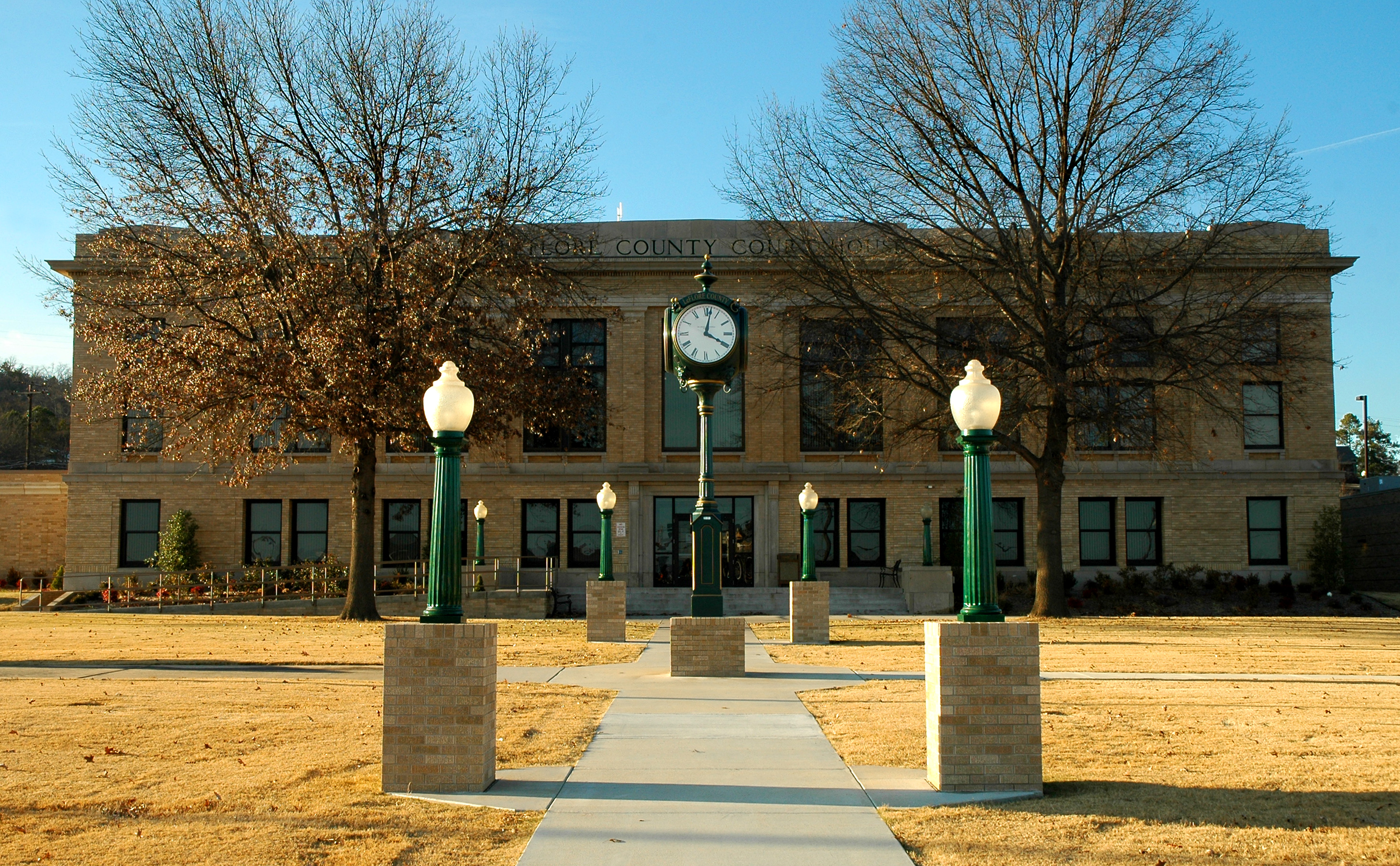
- The LeFlore County Courthouse is one of five sites in Poteau listed on the National Register of Historic Places

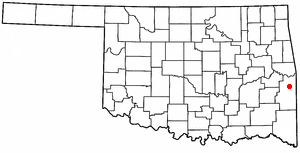
- Location of Poteau, Oklahoma
- Coordinates: 34°59′48″N 94°37′22″W
- Country: United States
- State: Oklahoma
- County: Le Flore

Area
  - Total: 28.73 sq mi (74.40 km^{2})
  - Land: 26.61 sq mi (68.91 km^{2})
  - Water: 2.12 sq mi (5.49 km^{2})
- Elevation: 446 ft (136 m)

Population (2020)
  - Total: 8,807
  - Density: 331/sq mi (127.8/km^{2})
- Time zone: UTC-6 (Central (CST))
  - Summer (DST): UTC-5 (CDT)
- ZIP code: 74953
- Area codes: 539/918
- FIPS code: 40-60350
- GNIS feature ID: 2411476
- Website: poteau-ok.com

Poteau (/ˈpoʊtoʊ/ POH-toh) is a city in and the county seat of LeFlore County, Oklahoma, United States. As of the 2020 census, Poteau had a population of 8,807.

== History ==
In 1719, Bernard de la Harpe led a group of French explorers through this area, and gave the river its present name. The present-day city was founded in 1885, its name derived from the nearby Poteau River. During the late 1700s, a large French outpost was at Belle Point (Ft. Smith). Further up the Poteau River was a secondary post at the base of Cavanal Mountain. Because of this, the river was named the "Post River", or Poteau River, and the outpost was simply called the post, or "Poteau". Poteau is a French word meaning post.

The Poteau Chamber of Commerce has written that the community was founded in 1885 as a few houses and Bud Tate's general store. At the time of its founding, Poteau was in Sugar Loaf County, a part of the Moshulatubbee District of the Choctaw Nation. It was incorporated as a town in the Indian Territory by the federal government on October 8, 1898. The first stone public building, a school, was also built in 1898. The Fort Smith and Southern Railway built a rail line through the Poteau area in 1886–1887, en route to Paris, Texas, including a station within the city. The Poteau post office opened in 1887 and the Kansas City, Pittsburg and Gulf Railroad (acquired by the Kansas City Southern Railway in 1900) began serving the town in 1896.

In 1900, the Federal Court of Indian Territory was moved from Cameron, Oklahoma, to Poteau. The Poteau News was first published in 1905. Other modern improvements during the run-up to statehood included: The Bank of Poteau in 1901 (which became a national bank in 1904), and the First Bank of Poteau in 1904. (Note: Together, the two banks had deposits estimated at $50,000 each.) A telephone company franchise was granted in 1904, and an electric utility and waterworks system was begun in 1906. After statehood, Governor Charles N. Haskell declared Poteau as a "city of the first class."

== Geography ==
According to the United States Census Bureau, the city has a total area of 31.7 square miles (82 km^{2}), of which 3.0 square miles (7.8 km^{2}), or 9.54%, are covered by water. It is about 12 miles (19 km) west of the Oklahoma-Arkansas border.

The city is located in the valley below Cavanal Hill, dubbed the "World's Highest Hill" with a signed elevation of 1,999 feet (609 m). The location was a subject of extensive coal mining in the first half of the 20th century, and a railway, eventually called the Poteau and Cavanal Mountain Railroad, served the mines. The summit elevation of the hill is 2,385 feet (727 m) above sea level, while the hill rises 1,960 feet (600 m) above the Poteau River on the east side of Poteau.

=== Climate ===
Poteau is tied with several other towns for the highest recorded temperature in the state of Oklahoma.

Climate data for Poteau, OK
Month	Jan	Feb	Mar	Apr	May	Jun	Jul	Aug	Sep	Oct	Nov	Dec	Year
Record high °F (°C)	84 (29)	85 (29)	92 (33)	95 (35)	100 (38)	110 (43)	113 (45)	120 (49)	110 (43)	101 (38)	88 (31)	83 (28)	120 (49)
Mean daily maximum °F (°C)	52.5 (11.4)	57.0 (13.9)	65.1 (18.4)	75.0 (23.9)	81.7 (27.6)	89.7 (32.1)	95.3 (35.2)	95.3 (35.2)	88.2 (31.2)	78.1 (25.6)	64.5 (18.1)	55.4 (13.0)	74.8 (23.8)
Mean daily minimum °F (°C)	29.4 (−1.4)	33.5 (0.8)	41.2 (5.1)	50.7 (10.4)	58.3 (14.6)	66.5 (19.2)	70.4 (21.3)	69.6 (20.9)	62.2 (16.8)	51.1 (10.6)	39.8 (4.3)	32.8 (0.4)	50.5 (10.3)
Record low °F (°C)	−7 (−22)	−7 (−22)	7 (−14)	21 (−6)	34 (1)	46 (8)	49 (9)	49 (9)	33 (1)	23 (−5)	10 (−12)	−6 (−21)	−7 (−22)
Average precipitation inches (mm)	2.52 (64)	3.02 (77)	3.65 (93)	4.63 (118)	5.89 (150)	3.89 (99)	3.42 (87)	3.00 (76)	3.84 (98)	3.53 (90)	3.73 (95)	3.02 (77)	44.14 (1,124)
Average snowfall inches (cm)	2.1 (5.3)	2.3 (5.8)	0.3 (0.76)	0 (0)	0 (0)	0 (0)	0 (0)	0 (0)	0 (0)	0 (0)	0.1 (0.25)	0.6 (1.5)	5.4 (13.61)
Source: http://www.wrcc.dri.edu/cgi-bin/cliMAIN.pl?ok7246

== Demographics ==
Historical population
Census	Pop.	Note	%±
1900	1,182		—
1910	1,830		54.8%
1920	2,679		46.4%
1930	3,169		18.3%
1940	4,020		26.9%
1950	4,776		18.8%
1960	4,428		−7.3%
1970	5,500		24.2%
1980	7,089		28.9%
1990	7,210		1.7%
2000	7,939		10.1%
2010	8,520		7.3%
2020	8,807		3.4%
U.S. Decennial Census; 2014 Estimate

=== 2020 census ===
As of the 2020 census, Poteau had a population of 8,807. The median age was 34.2 years. 25.7% of residents were under the age of 18 and 16.7% of residents were 65 years of age or older. For every 100 females there were 93.9 males, and for every 100 females age 18 and over there were 92.4 males age 18 and over. 86.0% of residents lived in urban areas, while 14.0% lived in rural areas.

There were 3,239 households in Poteau, of which 33.5% had children under the age of 18 living in them. Of all households, 40.9% were married-couple households, 19.7% were households with a male householder and no spouse or partner present, and 32.2% were households with a female householder and no spouse or partner present. About 29.4% of all households were made up of individuals and 14.5% had someone living alone who was 65 years of age or older. Of those households, 2,224 were family households.

There were 3,656 housing units, of which 11.4% were vacant. Among occupied housing units, 58.4% were owner-occupied and 41.6% were renter-occupied. The homeowner vacancy rate was 2.2% and the rental vacancy rate was 9.3%.

Racial composition as of the 2020 census
Race	Percent
White	63.7%
Black or African American	1.3%
American Indian and Alaska Native	13.8%
Asian	0.9%
Native Hawaiian and Other Pacific Islander	0.2%
Some other race	7.7%
Two or more races	12.4%
Hispanic or Latino (of any race)	13.4%

=== 2000 census ===
As of the 2000 census, 7,939 people, 3,013 households, and 2,042 families lived in the city. The population density was 277.2 inhabitants per square mile (107.0/km^{2}). The 3,351 housing units had an average density of 117.0 per square mile (45.2/km^{2}). The racial makeup of the city was 82.14% White, 2.24% African American, 10.00% Native American, 0.38% Asian, 0.03% Pacific Islander, 1.39% from other races, and 3.83% from two or more races. Hispanics or Latinos of any race were 5.82% of the population.

Of the 3,013 households, 31.6% had children under 18 living with them, 50.0% were married couples living together, 13.3% had a female householder with no husband present, and 32.2% were not families. About 28.3% of all households were made up of individuals, and 14.9% had someone living alone who was 65 or older. The average household size was 2.48 and the average family size was 3.02.

In the city, the age distribution was 24.6% under 18, 12.8% from 18 to 24, 26.4% from 25 to 44, 19.9% from 45 to 64, and 16.3% who were 65 or older. The median age was 35 years. For every 100 females, there were 91.0 males. For every 100 females age 18 and over, there were 88.3 males.

The median income for a household in the city was $26,178, and for a family was $31,226. Males had a median income of $24,595 versus $20,625 for females. The per capita income for the city was $15,175. About 19.3% of families and 22.1% of the population were below the poverty line, including 31.8% of those under 18 and 13.4% of those 65 or over.

== Parks and recreation ==
Twyman Park offers picnic tables and shelters, a playground, tennis courts, a small pond, and a pool. Other city facilities include the Poteau Area Recreational Complex for sports events, as well as Bill J. Barber Park and Dunbar Park. Lake Wister and Lake Wister State Park are located in Poteau.

== Government ==
Poteau has a mayor-council type of city government, with eight members on the council. The mayor and council members are elected by the citizens to four-year terms. The city police department consists of a chief, elected by citizen voters, and 12 officers who report to the chief. The city has an all-volunteer fire department, which has a fire chief, an assistant chief, captain, and 13 firemen.

== Education ==
The Poteau Public School System includes Poteau Primary School, Poteau Upper Elementary School, Pansy Kidd Middle School, the Seventh and Eighth Grade Center, and Poteau Senior High School. Pansy Kidd Middle School is named in honor of Pansy Ingle Kidd (1890–1978), who taught in Poteau for over 40 years and was nicknamed the "Dean of Poteau's Teachers".

In 1955, Dr. John Montgomery, a Black veterinarian, petitioned the Poteau Public School Board to eliminate the racial segregation of its schools. The board approved his petition, resulting in the integration of the school system and marking Poteau as the first city in Oklahoma to allow African Americans to learn alongside White students in its primary and secondary schools. Carl Albert State College, formerly known as Poteau Junior College, is one of the 13 state colleges found in Oklahoma. Kiamichi Technology Center, the largest division of the Oklahoma CareerTech System has a branch location in Poteau.

== Infrastructure ==
=== Transportation ===
Poteau is served by US Routes 59, 270, and 271, as well as State Highways 83 and 112. Robert S. Kerr Airport (KRKR; FAA ID: RKR), about 2 miles south of town, has a 4007 x 75 ft paved runway.

=== Police ===
The LeFlore County Sheriff's office in Poteau has six highway patrol officers and an inspector.

== Notable people ==
- Rilla Askew, writer
- Roberta Bell, artist
- Kenneth Corn, former Oklahoma state senator and Oklahoma state representative
- Ron Fortner, radio and television anchor
- Argus Hamilton, comedian and national columnist
- Billy Hoffman, country music singer, grew up in Poteau
- Robert S. Kerr, U.S. senator who owned a home and cattle ranch in the Poteau area
- Mick Thompson, former Oklahoma state representative and now Oklahoma State Banking commissioner
- Trevor Martin, professional baseball pitcher
