= Tahlequah Public Schools =

Public school district in Oklahoma, US

Location
- 225 North Water Avenue, Tahlequah, OK United States
- Coordinates: 35.914605°N 94.968932°W

District information
- Type: Public
- Motto: Tigers ROAR (Removing Obstacles Achieving Results)
- Grades: PK - 12
- Superintendent: Leon Ashlock
- Asst. superintendent(s): DeAnn Mashburn, Anita Lightcap, Randy Underwood, Tanya Jones, Susan VanZant
- Schools: Sequoyah Pre-School; Cherokee Elementary; Greenwood Elementary; Heritage Elementary; Tahlequah Middle; Tahlequah High; Central Academy
- Budget: $36285129.98

Students and staff
- Students: 3642
- Teachers: 257
- Staff: 468
- Athletic conference: 5A

Other information
- Website: tahlequahschools.org

Tahlequah Public Schools is a public school district in Tahlequah, Oklahoma. The district includes most of Tahlequah and Sparrowhawk and portions of Briggs, Caney Ridge, Eldon, Etta, Grandview, Keys, Park Hill, Shady Grove, Steely Hollow, Tenkiller, and Welling.

In October 2018, the school district had an enrollment of 3,642. The district runs seven schools, the Sequoyah Pre-School for pre-kindergarten education, three elementary schools, the Cherokee Elementary, the Greenwood Elementary and the Heritage Elementary, the (5-8 grades) Tahlequah Middle School, the (9-12 grades) Tahlequah High School, and Central Academy, which is an alternative school that provides alternative education.
