= Caney, Cherokee County, Oklahoma =

Unincorporated community in Oklahoma, US

Caney, Oklahoma
- Census-designated place
- Location within Oklahoma Location within the United States
- Coordinates: 35°50′05″N 94°51′30″W
- Country: United States
- State: Oklahoma
- County: Cherokee

Area
  - Total: 11.29 sq mi (29.24 km^{2})
  - Land: 11.27 sq mi (29.19 km^{2})
  - Water: 0.019 sq mi (0.05 km^{2})
- Elevation: 794 ft (242 m)

Population (2020)
  - Total: 382
  - Density: 33.9/sq mi (13.09/km^{2})
- Time zone: UTC-6 (Central (CST))
  - Summer (DST): UTC-5 (CDT)
- ZIP Code: 74471 (Welling)
- Area codes: 918/539
- FIPS code: 40-11562
- GNIS feature ID: 2807000

Caney is a census-designated place (CDP) in Cherokee County, Oklahoma, United States, within the Cherokee Nation. It was first listed as a CDP prior to the 2020 census. It includes the unincorporated community of Tailholt.

The CDP is in eastern Cherokee County, bordered to the south by Tenkiller, to the west by Etta, to the north by Welling, and to the east by Adair County. By road, it is 13 miles (21 km) southeast of Tahlequah, the county seat.

The majority of the CDP is drained by Caney Creek, which flows southwest to join the Illinois River in Tenkiller Ferry Lake. 1,220-foot-high (370 m) Sugar Mountain occupies the western part of the CDP, rising 400 feet (120 m) above the surrounding countryside.

== Demographics ==
Historical population
Census	Pop.	Note	%±
2020	382		—
U.S. Decennial Census

=== 2020 census ===
As of the 2020 census, Caney had a population of 382. The median age was 39.0 years. 24.3% of residents were under the age of 18 and 23.0% of residents were 65 years of age or older. For every 100 females there were 90.0 males, and for every 100 females age 18 and over there were 81.8 males age 18 and over.

0.0% of residents lived in urban areas, while 100.0% lived in rural areas.

There were 152 households in Caney, of which 29.6% had children under the age of 18 living in them. Of all households, 50.0% were married-couple households, 21.1% were households with a male householder and no spouse or partner present, and 24.3% were households with a female householder and no spouse or partner present. About 27.6% of all households were made up of individuals and 13.8% had someone living alone who was 65 years of age or older.

There were 164 housing units, of which 7.3% were vacant. The homeowner vacancy rate was 0.0% and the rental vacancy rate was 0.0%.

Racial composition as of the 2020 census
Race	Number	Percent
White	174	45.5%
Black or African American	0	0.0%
American Indian and Alaska Native	128	33.5%
Asian	2	0.5%
Native Hawaiian and Other Pacific Islander	0	0.0%
Some other race	0	0.0%
Two or more races	78	20.4%
Hispanic or Latino (of any race)	10	2.6%
