= Caney Ridge, Oklahoma =

Unincorporated community in Oklahoma, US

- Census-designated place
- Location within Oklahoma Location within the United States
- Coordinates: 35°45′52″N 94°52′51″W
- Country: United States
- State: Oklahoma
- County: Cherokee

Area
  - Total: 0.44 sq mi (1.14 km^{2})
  - Land: 0.28 sq mi (0.73 km^{2})
  - Water: 0.16 sq mi (0.41 km^{2})
- Elevation: 712 ft (217 m)

Population (2020)
  - Total: 120
  - Density: 426/sq mi (164.4/km^{2})
- Time zone: UTC-6 (Central (CST))
  - Summer (DST): UTC-5 (CDT)
- ZIP Code: 74471 (Welling)
- Area codes: 918/539
- FIPS code: 40-11575
- GNIS feature ID: 2812846

Caney Ridge is an unincorporated community and census-designated place (CDP) in Cherokee County, Oklahoma, United States, within the Cherokee Nation. It was first listed as a CDP prior to the 2020 census. As of the 2020 census, Caney Ridge had a population of 120.

The CDP is in southeastern Cherokee County, on a ridge between two arms of Tenkiller Ferry Lake: Caney Creek to the north and Dry Creek to the south. The CDP is bordered to the north by Tenkiller, to the east by Barber, and to the south by Dry Creek. The western tip of the CDP touches the Illinois River in Tenkiller Ferry Lake.

Oklahoma State Highway 100 passes through Caney Ridge, leading east 17 miles (27 km) to Stilwell and southwest 1 mile (1.6 km) to its end at State Highway 82, which leads northwest 13 miles (21 km) to Tahlequah, the Cherokee county seat.

== Demographics ==
Historical population
Census	Pop.	Note	%±
2020	120		—
U.S. Decennial Census

=== 2020 census ===
As of the 2020 census, Caney Ridge had a population of 120. The median age was 50.0 years. 23.3% of residents were under the age of 18 and 26.7% of residents were 65 years of age or older. For every 100 females there were 242.9 males, and for every 100 females age 18 and over there were 360.0 males age 18 and over.

0.0% of residents lived in urban areas, while 100.0% lived in rural areas.

There were 53 households in Caney Ridge, of which 24.5% had children under the age of 18 living in them. Of all households, 43.4% were married-couple households, 22.6% were households with a male householder and no spouse or partner present, and 26.4% were households with a female householder and no spouse or partner present. About 37.8% of all households were made up of individuals and 15.1% had someone living alone who was 65 years of age or older.

There were 74 housing units, of which 28.4% were vacant. The homeowner vacancy rate was 8.9% and the rental vacancy rate was 20.0%.

=== Racial and ethnic composition ===
Racial composition as of the 2020 census
Race	Number	Percent
White	51	42.5%
Black or African American	1	0.8%
American Indian and Alaska Native	50	41.7%
Asian	0	0.0%
Native Hawaiian and Other Pacific Islander	0	0.0%
Some other race	0	0.0%
Two or more races	18	15.0%
Hispanic or Latino (of any race)	6	5.0%
