= Barber, Oklahoma =

Unincorporated community in Oklahoma, US

- Census-designated place
- Location within Oklahoma Location within the United States
- Coordinates: 35°45′23″N 94°50′29″W
- Country: United States
- State: Oklahoma
- County: Cherokee

Area
  - Total: 6.53 sq mi (16.91 km^{2})
  - Land: 6.50 sq mi (16.83 km^{2})
  - Water: 0.031 sq mi (0.08 km^{2})
- Elevation: 896 ft (273 m)

Population (2020)
  - Total: 303
  - Density: 47/sq mi (18/km^{2})
- Time zone: UTC-6 (Central (CST))
  - Summer (DST): UTC-5 (CDT)
- ZIP Codes: 74471 (Welling); 74931 (Bunch)
- Area codes: 918/539
- FIPS code: 40-04200
- GNIS feature ID: 2805304

Barber is an unincorporated community and census-designated place (CDP) in Cherokee County, Oklahoma, United States, in the Cherokee Nation. As of the 2020 census, Barber had a population of 303. It was first listed as a CDP prior to the 2020 census.

The CDP is in southeastern Cherokee County, bordered to the north by Tenkiller, to the west by Caney Ridge, to the southwest by Dry Creek, and to the northeast by Rocky Mountain in Adair County. Oklahoma State Highway 100 passes through Barber, leading east 13 miles (21 km) to Stilwell and west 4 miles (6 km) to Highway 82 at Tenkiller Ferry Lake. Tahlequah is an additional 13 miles (21 km) to the northwest on Highway 82.

== Demographics ==
Historical population
| Census | Pop. | Note | %± |
|---|---|---|---|
| 2020 | 303 | | — |
U.S. Decennial Census

=== 2020 census ===
As of the 2020 census, Barber had a population of 303. The median age was 38.5 years. 26.4% of residents were under the age of 18 and 15.8% of residents were 65 years of age or older. For every 100 females there were 110.4 males, and for every 100 females age 18 and over there were 102.7 males age 18 and over.

0.0% of residents lived in urban areas, while 100.0% lived in rural areas.

There were 107 households in Barber, of which 24.3% had children under the age of 18 living in them. Of all households, 42.1% were married-couple households, 29.0% were households with a male householder and no spouse or partner present, and 25.2% were households with a female householder and no spouse or partner present. About 44.0% of all households were made up of individuals and 29.0% had someone living alone who was 65 years of age or older.

There were 134 housing units, of which 20.1% were vacant. The homeowner vacancy rate was 4.2% and the rental vacancy rate was 11.1%.

Racial composition as of the 2020 census
| Race | Number | Percent |
|---|---|---|
| White | 105 | 34.7% |
| Black or African American | 0 | 0.0% |
| American Indian and Alaska Native | 132 | 43.6% |
| Asian | 0 | 0.0% |
| Native Hawaiian and Other Pacific Islander | 0 | 0.0% |
| Some other race | 3 | 1.0% |
| Two or more races | 63 | 20.8% |
| Hispanic or Latino (of any race) | 14 | 4.6% |
