= Baron Fork of the Illinois River =

Location
- Country: United States
- Location: Northwestern Arkansas, Northeastern Oklahoma

Physical characteristics
- Source
  - location: Washington County, Arkansas
  - coordinates: 35°56′26″N 94°26′22″W
- Mouth
  - location: Illinois River (Oklahoma)
  - coordinates: 35°51′03″N 94°54′50″W
  - elevation: 640 ft
- Basin size: 1,660 mi^{2} (4,300 km^{2})
- Discharge
  - location: Eldon
  - average: 329 cu ft/s (9.3 m^{3}/s)

The Baron Fork of the Illinois River is a tributary of the Illinois River in the U.S. states of Arkansas and Oklahoma. The stream is sometimes called Baron Fork River, Barren Fork Creek or simply Barren Fork.

== Etymology ==
Official Oklahoma Department of Transportation (ODOT) highway signs call the stream Baron Fork. According to a 2009 article in the Tahlequah Daily Press, that designation is rather modern, coming into use during the 1970s. Older maps and documents refer to the stream as Barren Fork. Ed Fite, administrator of the Oklahoma Scenic Rivers Commission, is quoted as saying that Barren Fork is more accurate historically. Fite says that when explorers came up the Illinois River, they found the creek had no water and named it Barren Fork. Even the U. S. Geological Survey maps used the name Barren Fork until the 1970s, then changed to Baron Fork thereafter. The 2009 article points out that the book, "Oklahoma Place Names," listed a former community in Adair County had a post office from November 12, 1895 until December 31, 1942, named Barren Fork,"...from the Barren Fork tributary of the Illinois River."

== Course ==
The stream rises south of Lincoln in Washington County, Arkansas and flows southwest past Dutch Mills passing under Arkansas Highway 59, then westerly into Adair County, Oklahoma passing under U.S. Route 59 near Baron and on into Cherokee County, Oklahoma. It empties into the main branch of the Illinois River near the community of Welling, Oklahoma, just upstream of Lake Tenkiller.

The stream drains an area of 1,660 square miles (4,300 km^{2}) in the two states and is said to be the largest contributor to Oklahoma's Lake Tenkiller. Its tributaries include Jordan Creek in Arkansas and Evansville Creek, Shell Branch, Peavine Creek, and Tyner Creek, all in Oklahoma.

Baron Fork was designated a Scenic River by the Oklahoma legislature in 1970, pursuant to the state's Scenic Rivers Act.

== Recreation ==
Fishing is a popular sport along the Baron Fork. A news station once named the creek as "one of Oklahoma's 10 best streams." The item stated that the best access to the creek was in Cherokee County, Oklahoma. It cited smallmouth bass, black bass and sand bass fishing as being particularly good.
