= Etta, Oklahoma =

Unincorporated community in Oklahoma, US

- Census-designated place
- Location within Oklahoma Location within the United States
- Coordinates: 35°49′59″N 94°54′13″W
- Country: United States
- State: Oklahoma
- County: Cherokee

Area
  - Total: 4.11 sq mi (10.64 km^{2})
  - Land: 3.86 sq mi (10.01 km^{2})
  - Water: 0.24 sq mi (0.63 km^{2})
- Elevation: 646 ft (197 m)

Population (2020)
  - Total: 80
  - Density: 20.7/sq mi (7.99/km^{2})
- Time zone: UTC-6 (Central (CST))
  - Summer (DST): UTC-5 (CDT)
- ZIP Code: 74471 (Welling)
- Area codes: 918/539
- FIPS code: 40-24500
- GNIS feature ID: 2807002

Etta is a census-designated place (CDP) in Cherokee County, Oklahoma, United States, within the Cherokee Nation. It was first listed as a CDP prior to the 2020 census. As of the 2020 census, Etta had a population of 80.

The CDP is in eastern Cherokee County, on the east bank of the Illinois River, extending from the Baron Fork in the north to downstream from the Etta Bend Public Use Area in the south, by which point the river is impounded as Tenkiller Ferry Lake. The CDP is bordered to the north by Welling, to the east by Caney, and to the southwest by Tenkiller. The CDP is bordered across the Illinois River by Keys to the southwest and Park Hill to the northwest. By road, Etta is 11 miles (18 km) southeast of Tahlequah, the Cherokee county seat.

== Demographics ==
=== 2020 census ===
As of the 2020 census, Etta had a population of 80. The median age was 48.0 years. 22.5% of residents were under the age of 18 and 12.5% of residents were 65 years of age or older. For every 100 females there were 122.2 males, and for every 100 females age 18 and over there were 138.5 males age 18 and over.

0.0% of residents lived in urban areas, while 100.0% lived in rural areas.

There were 39 households in Etta, of which 23.1% had children under the age of 18 living in them. Of all households, 38.5% were married-couple households, 17.9% were households with a male householder and no spouse or partner present, and 41.0% were households with a female householder and no spouse or partner present. About 35.9% of all households were made up of individuals and 15.4% had someone living alone who was 65 years of age or older.

There were 39 housing units, of which 0.0% were vacant. The homeowner vacancy rate was 0.0% and the rental vacancy rate was 0.0%.

Racial composition as of the 2020 census
Race	Number	Percent
White	22	27.5%
Black or African American	0	0.0%
American Indian and Alaska Native	40	50.0%
Asian	3	3.8%
Native Hawaiian and Other Pacific Islander	0	0.0%
Some other race	0	0.0%
Two or more races	15	18.8%
Hispanic or Latino (of any race)	1	1.2%
