= Tenkiller =

Tenkiller may refer to:

- Tenkiller, Oklahoma
- Tenkiller Ferry Lake
- Tenkiller State Park
- Terror at Tenkiller, an American 1986 horror film
