= Pumpkin Hollow, Oklahoma =

Unincorporated community in Oklahoma, US

- Census-designated place
- Location within Oklahoma Location within the United States
- Coordinates: 35°59′01″N 94°50′57″W
- Country: United States
- State: Oklahoma
- County: Cherokee

Area
  - Total: 14.78 sq mi (38.29 km^{2})
  - Land: 14.73 sq mi (38.14 km^{2})
  - Water: 0.062 sq mi (0.16 km^{2})
- Elevation: 991 ft (302 m)

Population (2020)
  - Total: 176
  - Density: 11.9/sq mi (4.61/km^{2})
- Time zone: UTC-6 (Central (CST))
  - Summer (DST): UTC-5 (CDT)
- ZIP Codes: 74464 (Tahlequah); 74457 (Proctor)
- Area codes: 918/539
- FIPS code: 40-61113
- GNIS feature ID: 2807004

Pumpkin Hollow is a census-designated place (CDP) in Cherokee County, Oklahoma, United States, within the Cherokee Nation. It was first listed as a CDP prior to the 2020 census. As of the 2020 census, Pumpkin Hollow had a population of 176.

The CDP is in eastern Cherokee County, bordered to the east by Adair County, to the northwest by Tully Hollow, and to the southwest by the Illinois River, across from which is the CDP of Sparrowhawk. Pumpkin Hollow is the main valley in the community, running from the northeast to the southwest end.

By road, the community is 9 miles (14 km) northeast of Tahlequah, the county seat.

This is not to be confused with the unincorporated community of Pumpkin Center located elsewhere in the county.

== Demographics ==
Historical population
Census	Pop.	Note	%±
2020	176		—
U.S. Decennial Census

=== 2020 census ===
As of the 2020 census, Pumpkin Hollow had a population of 176. The median age was 36.3 years. 26.1% of residents were under the age of 18 and 15.9% of residents were 65 years of age or older. For every 100 females there were 97.8 males, and for every 100 females age 18 and over there were 85.7 males age 18 and over.

0.0% of residents lived in urban areas, while 100.0% lived in rural areas.

There were 62 households in Pumpkin Hollow, of which 25.8% had children under the age of 18 living in them. Of all households, 45.2% were married-couple households, 22.6% were households with a male householder and no spouse or partner present, and 30.6% were households with a female householder and no spouse or partner present. About 29.1% of all households were made up of individuals and 19.4% had someone living alone who was 65 years of age or older.

There were 70 housing units, of which 11.4% were vacant. The homeowner vacancy rate was 3.3% and the rental vacancy rate was 0.0%.

Racial composition as of the 2020 census
Race	Number	Percent
White	77	43.8%
Black or African American	0	0.0%
American Indian and Alaska Native	81	46.0%
Asian	0	0.0%
Native Hawaiian and Other Pacific Islander	0	0.0%
Some other race	0	0.0%
Two or more races	18	10.2%
Hispanic or Latino (of any race)	1	0.6%
