= Caney =

Caney may refer to:

== Places ==
In the United States:

- Caney, Kansas
- Caney, Kentucky
- Pippa Passes, Kentucky, known to its inhabitants as Caney or Caney Creek
- Caney, Oklahoma, in Atoka County
- Caney, Cherokee County, Oklahoma

In Cuba:

- El Caney

== See also ==
- Caney Creek (disambiguation)
