= Caney Creek (Oklahoma) =

River in Oklahoma, United States

Location
- Country: United States

Physical characteristics
- Source
  - location: near Stilwell, Oklahoma
  - coordinates: 35°47′50″N 94°36′43″W
- Mouth: Tenkiller Ferry Lake
  - location: north of Cookson, Oklahoma
  - coordinates: 35°45′59″N 94°53′11″W

Caney Creek is a watercourse in Adair County and Cherokee County in Oklahoma, United States. It forms just southeast of Stilwell and travels on an arc generally northwest, west, and then southwest before emptying into Tenkiller Ferry Lake on the Illinois River east of Pettit.

Popular species of fish caught in Caney Creek include smallmouth bass, spotted bass, and largemouth bass.
