= Briggs, Oklahoma =

Unincorporated community in Oklahoma, US

Briggs, Oklahoma ᎠᏥᎾ ᏗᏡᎬ (Cherokee)
- Census-designated place
- Location within Cherokee County and the state of Oklahoma
- Coordinates: 35°55′14″N 94°52′25″W
- Country: United States
- State: Oklahoma
- County: Cherokee

Area
  - Total: 8.54 sq mi (22.11 km^{2})
  - Land: 8.44 sq mi (21.86 km^{2})
  - Water: 0.093 sq mi (0.24 km^{2})
- Elevation: 929 ft (283 m)

Population (2020)
  - Total: 1,028
  - Density: 121.8/sq mi (47.02/km^{2})
- Time zone: UTC-6 (Central (CST))
  - Summer (DST): UTC-5 (CDT)
- FIPS code: 40-08775
- GNIS feature ID: 2407904

Briggs (Cherokee: ᎠᏥᎾ ᏗᏡᎬ) is an unincorporated community and census-designated place (CDP) in Cherokee County, Oklahoma, United States. As of the 2020 census, Briggs had a population of 1,028.

== History ==
The community is said to have been named for John Briggs, a local merchant.

== Geography ==
Briggs is located east of the center of Cherokee County. It lies east of Tahlequah, the county seat, along U.S. Route 62. The Illinois River, a tributary of the Arkansas River, forms the northern and western edge of the community. Briggs is bordered to the south by Park Hill and to the north by Sparrowhawk. Eldon is 5 miles (8 km) to the east on US-62.

According to the United States Census Bureau, the Briggs CDP has a total area of 3.9 square miles (10.1 km^{2}), of which 3.9 square miles (10.0 km^{2}) is land and 0.04 square miles (0.1 km^{2}), or 1.40%, is water.

== Demographics ==
Historical population
Census	Pop.	Note	%±
2000	358		—
2010	303		−15.4%
2020	1,028		239.3%
U.S. Decennial Census

=== 2020 census ===
As of the 2020 census, Briggs had a population of 1,028. The median age was 37.5 years. 27.4% of residents were under the age of 18 and 14.1% of residents were 65 years of age or older. For every 100 females there were 98.1 males, and for every 100 females age 18 and over there were 99.5 males age 18 and over.

0.0% of residents lived in urban areas, while 100.0% lived in rural areas.

There were 392 households in Briggs, of which 32.4% had children under the age of 18 living in them. Of all households, 49.0% were married-couple households, 16.3% were households with a male householder and no spouse or partner present, and 28.6% were households with a female householder and no spouse or partner present. About 32.4% of all households were made up of individuals and 15.9% had someone living alone who was 65 years of age or older.

There were 432 housing units, of which 9.3% were vacant. The homeowner vacancy rate was 0.3% and the rental vacancy rate was 13.8%.

Racial composition as of the 2020 census
Race	Number	Percent
White	352	34.2%
Black or African American	1	0.1%
American Indian and Alaska Native	482	46.9%
Asian	0	0.0%
Native Hawaiian and Other Pacific Islander	1	0.1%
Some other race	57	5.5%
Two or more races	135	13.1%
Hispanic or Latino (of any race)	105	10.2%

=== 2000 census ===
As of the census of 2000, there were 358 people, 129 households, and 95 families residing in the CDP. The population density was 90.5 inhabitants per square mile (34.9/km^{2}). There were 139 housing units at an average density of 35.1 per square mile (13.6/km^{2}). The racial makeup of the CDP was 45.53% White, 38.27% Native American, 5.31% from other races, and 10.89% from two or more races. Hispanic or Latino of any race were 8.10% of the population.

There were 129 households, out of which 34.9% had children under the age of 18 living with them, 56.6% were married couples living together, 13.2% had a female householder with no husband present, and 25.6% were non-families. 20.2% of all households were made up of individuals, and 2.3% had someone living alone who was 65 years of age or older. The average household size was 2.78 and the average family size was 3.17.

In the CDP, the population was spread out, with 29.1% under the age of 18, 7.8% from 18 to 24, 32.1% from 25 to 44, 22.6% from 45 to 64, and 8.4% who were 65 years of age or older. The median age was 32 years. For every 100 females, there were 109.4 males. For every 100 females age 18 and over, there were 104.8 males.

The median income for a household in the CDP was $31,250, and the median income for a family was $30,781. Males had a median income of $21,875 versus $35,500 for females. The per capita income for the CDP was $14,340. About 11.9% of families and 13.8% of the population were below the poverty line, including none of those under age 18 and 40.0% of those age 65 or over.

== Education ==
The Briggs Elementary School supports students through the eighth grade.
