= Caney Creek =

Caney Creek may refer to:

- Caney Creek (Arkansas) in the Ouachita National Forest
  - Caney Creek Wilderness, Arkansas
- Caney Creek (Kentucky)
  - Pippa Passes, Kentucky, a city along the creek known to its inhabitants as "Caney Creek"
- Caney Creek (Pine Creek tributary) in Ozark County, Missouri
- Caney Creek (Scott County, Missouri)
- Caney Creek (Oklahoma), located in Adair and Cherokee counties in Oklahoma
- Caney Creek (Matagorda Bay) in Texas
- Caney Creek (San Jacinto River tributary) in Texas
