= Norwood, Oklahoma =

Unincorporated community in Oklahoma, US

- Census-designated place
- Location within Oklahoma Location within the United States
- Coordinates: 35°50′57″N 95°08′57″W
- Country: United States
- State: Oklahoma
- Counties: Cherokee; Muskogee

Area
  - Total: 32.46 sq mi (84.06 km^{2})
  - Land: 32.43 sq mi (83.99 km^{2})
  - Water: 0.027 sq mi (0.07 km^{2})
- Elevation: 899 ft (274 m)

Population (2020)
  - Total: 1,679
  - Density: 51.8/sq mi (19.99/km^{2})
- Time zone: UTC-6 (Central (CST))
  - Summer (DST): UTC-5 (CDT)
- ZIP Codes: 74434 (Fort Gibson); 74441 (Hulbert); 74464 (Tahlequah)
- Area codes: 918/539
- FIPS code: 40-52859
- GNIS feature ID: 2805345

Norwood is a census-designated place (CDP) in Cherokee and Muskogee counties, Oklahoma, United States. As of the 2020 census, it had a population of 1,679.

== Geography ==
The CDP is mainly in western Cherokee County and extends to the south into the northeast corner of Muskogee County. It is bordered to the southeast by Woodall. U.S. Route 62 forms the southern edge of the CDP; it leads west 4 miles (6 km) to Fort Gibson and northeast 16 miles (26 km) to Tahlequah, the Cherokee county seat. Norwood Mountain is in the northern part of the CDP.

According to the U.S. Census Bureau, the Norwood CDP has a total area of 32.46 square miles (84.07 km^{2}), of which 0.03 square miles (0.08 km^{2}), or 0.08%, are water. The Arkansas River is 2 miles (3 km) west of the community.

== Demographics ==
Historical population
Census	Pop.	Note	%±
2020	1,679		—
U.S. Decennial Census

Norwood was first listed as a census-designated place for the 2020 census.

=== 2020 census ===
As of the 2020 census, Norwood had a population of 1,679. The median age was 42.2 years. 23.3% of residents were under the age of 18 and 19.0% of residents were 65 years of age or older. For every 100 females there were 98.7 males, and for every 100 females age 18 and over there were 98.2 males age 18 and over.

0.0% of residents lived in urban areas, while 100.0% lived in rural areas.

There were 618 households in Norwood, of which 35.0% had children under the age of 18 living in them. Of all households, 66.2% were married-couple households, 13.6% were households with a male householder and no spouse or partner present, and 15.9% were households with a female householder and no spouse or partner present. About 20.0% of all households were made up of individuals and 9.9% had someone living alone who was 65 years of age or older.

There were 702 housing units, of which 12.0% were vacant. The homeowner vacancy rate was 2.4% and the rental vacancy rate was 9.4%.

Racial composition as of the 2020 census
Race	Number	Percent
White	881	52.5%
Black or African American	31	1.8%
American Indian and Alaska Native	522	31.1%
Asian	5	0.3%
Native Hawaiian and Other Pacific Islander	2	0.1%
Some other race	14	0.8%
Two or more races	224	13.3%
Hispanic or Latino (of any race)	43	2.6%
