= Zeb, Oklahoma =

- Census-designated place
- Location within Cherokee County and the state of Oklahoma
- Coordinates: 35°48′24″N 95°02′37″W
- Country: United States
- State: Oklahoma
- County: Cherokee

Area
  - Total: 8.69 sq mi (22.51 km^{2})
  - Land: 8.69 sq mi (22.51 km^{2})
  - Water: 0 sq mi (0.00 km^{2})
- Elevation: 827 ft (252 m)

Population (2020)
  - Total: 520
  - Density: 60/sq mi (23.1/km^{2})
- Time zone: UTC-6 (Central (CST))
  - Summer (DST): UTC-5 (CDT)
- FIPS code: 40-83030
- GNIS feature ID: 2409643

Zeb is an unincorporated community and census-designated place (CDP) in Cherokee County, Oklahoma, United States. The population was 520 as of the 2020 Census, up from the population of 497 reported at the 2010 census.

== Geography ==
Zeb is located 2 miles (3.2 km) north of the Cherokee Wildlife Management Area.

According to the United States Census Bureau, the CDP has a total land area of 8.6 square miles (22 km^{2}), all land.

== Demographics ==
Historical population
Census	Pop.	Note	%±
2010	497		—
2020	520		4.6%
U.S. Decennial Census

=== 2020 census ===
As of the 2020 census, Zeb had a population of 520. The median age was 39.3 years. 26.0% of residents were under the age of 18 and 15.2% of residents were 65 years of age or older. For every 100 females there were 86.4 males, and for every 100 females age 18 and over there were 79.9 males age 18 and over.

0.0% of residents lived in urban areas, while 100.0% lived in rural areas.

There were 199 households in Zeb, of which 37.2% had children under the age of 18 living in them. Of all households, 52.8% were married-couple households, 17.6% were households with a male householder and no spouse or partner present, and 15.6% were households with a female householder and no spouse or partner present. About 19.1% of all households were made up of individuals and 4.5% had someone living alone who was 65 years of age or older.

There were 222 housing units, of which 10.4% were vacant. The homeowner vacancy rate was 0.0% and the rental vacancy rate was 7.4%.

Racial composition as of the 2020 census
Race	Number	Percent
White	219	42.1%
Black or African American	0	0.0%
American Indian and Alaska Native	214	41.2%
Asian	1	0.2%
Native Hawaiian and Other Pacific Islander	0	0.0%
Some other race	11	2.1%
Two or more races	75	14.4%
Hispanic or Latino (of any race)	27	5.2%

=== 2010 census ===
As of the 2010 United States census, there were 497 people residing in Zeb. The population density was 58 inhabitants per square mile (22/km^{2}). There were 217 housing units at an average density of 23/sq mi (9/km^{2}). The racial makeup of the CDP was 55.42% White, 0.20% African American, 34.94% Native American, 0.20% Asian, and 9.24% from two or more races.

There were 179 households, out of which 37.4% had children under the age of 18 living with them, 70.4% were married couples living together, 6.7% had a female householder with no husband present, and 19.6% were non-families. 14.5% of all households were made up of individuals, and 6.7% had someone living alone who was 65 years of age or older. The average household size was 2.78 and the average family size was 3.10.

In the CDP, the population was spread out, with 27.1% under the age of 18, 9.4% from 18 to 24, 27.3% from 25 to 44, 25.9% from 45 to 64, and 10.2% who were 65 years of age or older. The median age was 34 years. For every 100 females, there were 98.4 males. For every 100 females age 18 and over, there were 93.1 males.

The median income for a household in the CDP was $32,500, and the median income for a family was $38,750. Males had a median income of $28,125 versus $22,250 for females. The per capita income for the CDP was $14,547. About 13.5% of families and 15.6% of the population were below the poverty line, including 16.9% of those under age 18 and 16.3% of those age 65 or over.

== Education ==
Much of Zeb CDP is in the Woodall Public School school district, while parts are in the Keys Public Schools school district, and other parts are in the Tahlequah Public Schools school district.
