= Steely Hollow, Oklahoma =

- Census-designated place
- Location within Oklahoma
- Coordinates: 35°59′16″N 94°56′44″W
- Country: United States
- State: Oklahoma
- County: Cherokee

Area
  - Total: 4.78 sq mi (12.39 km^{2})
  - Land: 4.77 sq mi (12.36 km^{2})
  - Water: 0.012 sq mi (0.03 km^{2})
- Elevation: 948 ft (289 m)

Population (2020)
  - Total: 292
  - Density: 61.2/sq mi (23.63/km^{2})
- Time zone: UTC-6 (Central (CST))
  - Summer (DST): UTC-5 (CST)
- FIPS code: 40-70037
- GNIS feature ID: 2584392

Steely Hollow is an unincorporated area and census-designated place (CDP) in Cherokee County, Oklahoma, United States. As of the 2020 census, Steely Hollow had a population of 292.

== Geography ==
The name "Steely Hollow" refers to a valley on the east side of the CDP, leading southeast to the Illinois River. Residences in the CDP are both within the valley of Steely Hollow and on high ground to the west of the valley. The CDP is located north of the center of Cherokee County, about 5 miles (8 km) north of Tahlequah, the county seat.

According to the United States Census Bureau, the CDP has a total area of 2.0 square miles (5.3 km^{2}), of which 0.008 square miles (0.02 km^{2}), or 0.38%, is water.

== Demographics ==
Historical population
Census	Pop.	Note	%±
2010	206		—
2020	292		41.7%
U.S. Decennial Census

=== 2020 census ===
As of the 2020 census, Steely Hollow had a population of 292. The median age was 43.3 years. 24.7% of residents were under the age of 18 and 17.8% of residents were 65 years of age or older. For every 100 females there were 129.9 males, and for every 100 females age 18 and over there were 120.0 males age 18 and over.

0.0% of residents lived in urban areas, while 100.0% lived in rural areas.

There were 101 households in Steely Hollow, of which 25.7% had children under the age of 18 living in them. Of all households, 59.4% were married-couple households, 22.8% were households with a male householder and no spouse or partner present, and 14.9% were households with a female householder and no spouse or partner present. About 24.8% of all households were made up of individuals and 12.8% had someone living alone who was 65 years of age or older.

There were 117 housing units, of which 13.7% were vacant. The homeowner vacancy rate was 2.6% and the rental vacancy rate was 16.7%.

Racial composition as of the 2020 census
Race	Number	Percent
White	129	44.2%
Black or African American	0	0.0%
American Indian and Alaska Native	108	37.0%
Asian	1	0.3%
Native Hawaiian and Other Pacific Islander	0	0.0%
Some other race	3	1.0%
Two or more races	51	17.5%
Hispanic or Latino (of any race)	12	4.1%

=== 2010 census ===
As of the 2010 census, Steely Hollow had a population of 206.
