= Agnes Cowen =

Cherokee politician and language advocate

Cherokee Nation Tribal Councilor for the at-large district

Personal details
- Born: Agnes Louise Stacy; May 1, 1927 Welling, Oklahoma, U.S.
- Died: August 29, 1999 (aged 72) Gore, Oklahoma, U.S.
- Citizenship: Cherokee Nation; United States
- Party: Democratic
- Children: 3
- Education: Northeastern State University

Agnes Louise Cowen (née Stacy; May 1, 1927 – August 29, 1999) was a Cherokee educator and politician who worked on bilingual education and language preservation initiatives. She served as the first elected female Cherokee Nation tribal councilor, representing the at-large district.

== Early life and education ==
Agnes Louise Cowen was born on May 1, 1927, in Welling, Oklahoma, to John Stacy and Jenny Spade. She attended schools in Welling and later studied at Northeastern State University where she earned a master’s degree in education.

== Career ==
=== Education ===
Cowen worked in education with a focus on bilingual and Native American educational initiatives. She was a language advocate who led the Cherokee Nation's language revitalization efforts in the early 1960s by implementing the Cherokee Bilingual Education Program and developing the first written Cherokee language lessons through a federal grant.

Cowen was the first president of the Oklahoma Association for Bilingual Education and served as the first elected representative for the Central States on the National Association for Bilingual Education Board. She was recognized by the Oklahoma Association for Bilingual Education as an outstanding educator. She was inducted into the Chilocco Hall of Fame and the Oklahoma Association for Bilingual Education Hall of Fame.

Cowen's professional affiliations included membership in the Technical Advisory Committee for the First National Indian Bilingual Center, the International Women’s Year Committee, and the Directory of American Indian-Alaska Native Women. She was also associated with the National Indian Education Association and the National Association for Bilingual Education.

=== Politics ===
Cowen was involved in civic and social organizations, including the Democratic Women Organization. She was a member of the Phi Kappa Delta sorority. Cowen was the first elected female Cherokee Nation tribal councilor. She represented the at-large district.

In 1983, Cowen lost by absentee votes in a run-off election for the deputy chief of Cherokee Nation post against Wilma Mankiller. Cowen demanded a recount and filed a suit with the Cherokee Judicial Appeals Tribunal and U. S. District Court alleging voting irregularities. Both tribal and federal courts ruled against Cowen.

== Personal life ==
On August 6, 1969, Cowen married David Cowen. They lived in Gore, Oklahoma. She had three children. Her personal interests included gardening, sewing, quilting, and writing.

Cowen died on August 29, 1999, in Gore, Oklahoma, at the age of 72. Her funeral was held at Reed-Culver Chapel in Tahlequah, Oklahoma, and she was interred at Manus Cemetery.

== See also ==
- List of Native American politicians
- Native American women in politics
