= Keys, Oklahoma =

Unincorporated community in Oklahoma, US

- Census-designated place
- Location within Cherokee County and the state of Oklahoma
- Coordinates: 35°48′08″N 94°57′38″W
- Country: United States
- State: Oklahoma
- County: Cherokee

Area
  - Total: 9.76 sq mi (25.29 km^{2})
  - Land: 9.75 sq mi (25.24 km^{2})
  - Water: 0.019 sq mi (0.05 km^{2})
- Elevation: 961 ft (293 m)

Population (2020)
  - Total: 1,030
  - Density: 105.7/sq mi (40.81/km^{2})
- Time zone: UTC-6 (Central (CST))
  - Summer (DST): UTC-5 (CST)
- FIPS code: 40-39625
- GNIS feature ID: 2408478

Keys is an unincorporated community and census-designated place (CDP) in Cherokee County, Oklahoma, United States. As of the 2020 census, Keys had a population of 1,030.

== Geography ==
Keys is located south of the center of Cherokee County and is bordered by Park Hill to the north and Pettit to the south. The eastern end of the CDP is bordered by the Illinois River at the northern end of Tenkiller Ferry Lake.

Oklahoma State Highway 82 forms the western and southern edges of the Keys CDP; it leads north 8 miles (13 km) to Tahlequah, the Cherokee County seat, and southeast 5 miles (8.0 km) to Cherokee Landing State Park on Tenkiller Ferry Lake.

According to the United States Census Bureau, the Keys CDP has a total area of 5.53 square miles (14.33 km^{2}), of which 5.51 square miles (14.28 km^{2}) is land and 0.02 square miles (0.05 km^{2}), or 0.33%, is water.

== School ==
Keys has recently acquired a high school. Its mascot is a cougar, and the school colors are red and white.

== Demographics ==
Historical population
Census	Pop.	Note	%±
2010	565		—
2020	1,030		82.3%
U.S. Decennial Census

=== 2020 census ===
As of the 2020 census, Keys had a population of 1,030. The median age was 38.3 years. 27.6% of residents were under the age of 18 and 17.8% of residents were 65 years of age or older. For every 100 females there were 83.3 males, and for every 100 females age 18 and over there were 84.2 males age 18 and over.

0.0% of residents lived in urban areas, while 100.0% lived in rural areas.

There were 377 households in Keys, of which 35.3% had children under the age of 18 living in them. Of all households, 56.2% were married-couple households, 18.3% were households with a male householder and no spouse or partner present, and 23.1% were households with a female householder and no spouse or partner present. About 22.8% of all households were made up of individuals and 14.0% had someone living alone who was 65 years of age or older.

There were 445 housing units, of which 15.3% were vacant. The homeowner vacancy rate was 2.3% and the rental vacancy rate was 5.7%.

Racial composition as of the 2020 census
Race	Number	Percent
White	466	45.2%
Black or African American	6	0.6%
American Indian and Alaska Native	357	34.7%
Asian	2	0.2%
Native Hawaiian and Other Pacific Islander	0	0.0%
Some other race	7	0.7%
Two or more races	192	18.6%
Hispanic or Latino (of any race)	53	5.1%

=== 2010 census ===
At the 2010 census, there were 565 people, 189 households and 160 families residing in the CDP. The population density was 102.7 inhabitants per square mile (39.7/km^{2}). There were 221 housing units at an average density of 40.2 per square mile (15.5/km^{2}). The racial makeup of the CDP was 47.8% White, 0.5% African American, 37.2% Native American, 2.3% from other races, and 12.2% from two or more races. Hispanic or Latino of any race were 4.2% of the population.

There were 189 households, of which 39.7% had children under the age of 18 living with them, 65.6% were married couples living together, 13.2% had a female householder with no husband present, and 15.3% were non-families. 12.2% of all households were made up of individuals, and 4.8% had someone living alone who was 65 years of age or older. The average household size was 2.99 and the average family size was 3.26.

29.7% of the population were under the age of 18, 9.0% from 18 to 24, 25.8% from 25 to 44, 22.3% from 45 to 64, and 13.1% who were 65 years of age or older. The median age was 35.1 years. For every 100 females, there were 85.2 males. For every 100 females age 18 and over, there were 93.7 males.
