= Gore, Oklahoma =

- Town
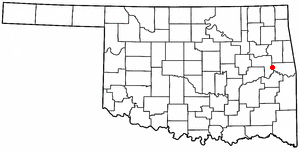
- Location of Gore, Oklahoma
- Coordinates: 35°32′30″N 95°06′47″W
- Country: United States
- State: Oklahoma
- County: Sequoyah
- Established: Date of Decision: January 29, 1902, Officially Established: May 24, 1902

Area
  - Total: 2.29 sq mi (5.92 km^{2})
  - Land: 2.28 sq mi (5.91 km^{2})
  - Water: 0.0039 sq mi (0.01 km^{2})
- Elevation: 535 ft (163 m)

Population (2020)
  - Total: 951
  - Density: 416.5/sq mi (160.83/km^{2})
- Time zone: UTC-6 (Central (CST))
  - Summer (DST): UTC-5 (CDT)
- ZIP code: 74435
- Area codes: 539/918
- FIPS code: 40-30300
- GNIS feature ID: 2412692
- Website: www.townofgoreok.gov

Gore is a town in western Sequoyah County, Oklahoma, United States. It is part of the Fort Smith, Arkansas-Oklahoma Metropolitan Statistical Area. As of the 2020 census, Gore had a population of 951.

Gore claims to be the "trout capital of Oklahoma", with great fishing in Lake Tenkiller, the Illinois River, and the Arkansas River.

== History ==
This community began as a small settlement in Indian Territory known as Campbell, named for Dr. W. W. Campbell, who, along with Joe Lynch, operated a ferry across the Arkansas River between Campbell and Webbers Falls. Tahlonteskee, the capital of the Western Cherokee from 1828–1839, was near here, just two miles to the north of town. (Note: After the Eastern Cherokee were relocated to Indian Territory and united with the Western Cherokees, Tahlequah became the Cherokee capital. Thereafter, Tahlonteskee became the courthouse of the Illinois District of the Cherokee Nation until 1846.) In 1829, John Jolly, chief of the Cherokee Nation–West, built a home in this area.

The settlement was also known as Illinois Station or "Illinois Station, Campbell Post Office." It became a stage stop on the route between Fort Gibson and Fort Smith. A post office designation of Campbell was assigned to Dr. Campbell's store in 1888. Also in 1888, the St. Louis, Iron Mountain and Southern Railway (later the Missouri Pacific Railway) built a rail line through the settlement.

By 1909, the town had a bank, two lumber companies, a flour mill, a cotton gin, two hotels, and numerous retail outlets. The town changed its name on October 22, 1909, in honor of Oklahoma Senator Thomas Gore, who was serving as one of Oklahoma's U. S. senators immediately after statehood. A fire destroyed most of the business district in 1909. Gore had a population of 319 by the 1910 U. S. census.

The town almost got a second rail line in 1917 when Congress approved construction by the Webbers Falls Railroad of a bridge over the Arkansas from Webbers Falls. However, that railroad was instead scrapped in 1918.

Kerr-McGee built the Sequoyah Fuels Corporation uranium mill on a 300 acres (120 ha) tract located 3 miles (4.8 km) east of Gore to convert uranium ore into uranium hexafluoride (UF_{6}). (Note: The product was shipped to another plant near Oklahoma City, where it was used to make fuel rods for nuclear reactors.) The UF_{6} plant was bought by General Atomics in 1988, and closed in 1993.

== Demographics ==
Historical population
Census	Pop.	Note	%±
1910	316		—
1920	329		4.1%
1930	297		−9.7%
1940	334		12.5%
1950	387		15.9%
1960	334		−13.7%
1970	478		43.1%
1980	445		−6.9%
1990	690		55.1%
2000	850		23.2%
2010	977		14.9%
2020	951		−2.7%
U.S. Decennial Census

=== 2020 census ===
As of the 2020 census, Gore had a population of 951. The median age was 40.7 years. 24.1% of residents were under the age of 18 and 23.6% of residents were 65 years of age or older. For every 100 females there were 91.3 males, and for every 100 females age 18 and over there were 85.6 males age 18 and over.

0.0% of residents lived in urban areas, while 100.0% lived in rural areas.

There were 386 households in Gore, of which 30.3% had children under the age of 18 living in them. Of all households, 44.6% were married-couple households, 17.9% were households with a male householder and no spouse or partner present, and 33.7% were households with a female householder and no spouse or partner present. About 34.9% of all households were made up of individuals and 20.7% had someone living alone who was 65 years of age or older.

There were 477 housing units, of which 19.1% were vacant. The homeowner vacancy rate was 1.8% and the rental vacancy rate was 10.1%.

Racial composition as of the 2020 census
Race	Number	Percent
White	557	58.6%
Black or African American	7	0.7%
American Indian and Alaska Native	246	25.9%
Asian	9	0.9%
Native Hawaiian and Other Pacific Islander	0	0.0%
Some other race	5	0.5%
Two or more races	127	13.4%
Hispanic or Latino (of any race)	12	1.3%

=== 2000 census ===
As of the census of 2000, there were 850 people, 368 households, and 257 families residing in the town. The population density was 372.4 inhabitants per square mile (143.8/km^{2}). There were 416 housing units at an average density of 182.3 per square mile (70.4/km^{2}). The racial makeup of the town was 68.59% White, 0.12% African American, 24.71% Native American, 0.12% from other races, and 6.47% from two or more races. Hispanic or Latino of any race were 0.82% of the population.

There were 368 households, out of which 28.5% had children under the age of 18 living with them, 56.0% were married couples living together, 12.0% had a female householder with no husband present, and 29.9% were non-families. 26.9% of all households were made up of individuals, and 12.0% had someone living alone who was 65 years of age or older. The average household size was 2.31 and the average family size was 2.78.

In the town, the population was spread out, with 23.9% under the age of 18, 8.8% from 18 to 24, 21.9% from 25 to 44, 26.9% from 45 to 64, and 18.5% who were 65 years of age or older. The median age was 42 years. For every 100 females, there were 89.3 males. For every 100 females age 18 and over, there were 81.7 males.

The median income for a household in the town was $27,266, and the median income for a family was $37,000. Males had a median income of $28,125 versus $27,188 for females. The per capita income for the town was $16,059. About 15.2% of families and 16.6% of the population were below the poverty line, including 18.2% of those under age 18 and 21.1% of those age 65 or over.

== Notable people ==
- Agnes Cowen (1927–1999), member of the Cherokee Nation Tribal Council
- Thomas Gore, for whom the town is named, is claimed to have been an atheist
- Joshua Morrow of The Young and the Restless briefly attended school at Gore.
- Steve Owens, Gore is the birthplace of 1969 Heisman Trophy Winner.
- G. Steven Rowe, Attorney General for the State of Maine is from Gore.
- John Whisenant, Professional basketball coach was born and raised in Gore.
