= Woodall, Oklahoma =

- Census-designated place
- Location within Cherokee County and the state of Oklahoma
- Coordinates: 35°49′10″N 95°05′08″W
- Country: United States
- State: Oklahoma
- County: Cherokee

Area
  - Total: 11.06 sq mi (28.65 km^{2})
  - Land: 11.06 sq mi (28.65 km^{2})
  - Water: 0 sq mi (0.00 km^{2})
- Elevation: 699 ft (213 m)

Population (2020)
  - Total: 816
  - Density: 73.8/sq mi (28.49/km^{2})
- Time zone: UTC-6 (Central (CST))
  - Summer (DST): UTC-5 (CDT)
- FIPS code: 40-81912
- GNIS feature ID: 2409621

Woodall is an unincorporated community and census-designated place (CDP) in Cherokee County, Oklahoma, United States. As of the 2020 census, Woodall had a population of 816.

== Geography ==
Woodall is located in western Cherokee County. U.S. Route 62 forms the southern boundary of the CDP, separating it from Zeb. US-62 leads northeast 9 miles (14 km) to Tahlequah, the Cherokee County seat, and southwest 22 miles (35 km) to Muskogee.

According to the United States Census Bureau, the Woodall CDP has a total area of 11.0 square miles (28.6 km^{2}), all land.

== Demographics ==
Historical population
Census	Pop.	Note	%±
2000	741		—
2010	823		11.1%
2020	816		−0.9%
U.S. Decennial Census

=== 2020 census ===
As of the 2020 census, Woodall had a population of 816. The median age was 40.2 years. 26.1% of residents were under the age of 18 and 17.3% of residents were 65 years of age or older. For every 100 females there were 105.0 males, and for every 100 females age 18 and over there were 100.3 males age 18 and over.

0.0% of residents lived in urban areas, while 100.0% lived in rural areas.

There were 306 households in Woodall, of which 34.6% had children under the age of 18 living in them. Of all households, 55.6% were married-couple households, 18.0% were households with a male householder and no spouse or partner present, and 20.3% were households with a female householder and no spouse or partner present. About 19.6% of all households were made up of individuals and 5.6% had someone living alone who was 65 years of age or older.

There were 325 housing units, of which 5.8% were vacant. The homeowner vacancy rate was 0.0% and the rental vacancy rate was 11.8%.

Racial composition as of the 2020 census
Race	Number	Percent
White	306	37.5%
Black or African American	3	0.4%
American Indian and Alaska Native	316	38.7%
Asian	0	0.0%
Native Hawaiian and Other Pacific Islander	0	0.0%
Some other race	52	6.4%
Two or more races	139	17.0%
Hispanic or Latino (of any race)	83	10.2%

=== 2000 census ===
As of the census of 2000, there were 741 people, 279 households, and 220 families residing in the CDP. The population density was 66.4 inhabitants per square mile (25.6/km^{2}). There were 306 housing units at an average density of 27.4 per square mile (10.6/km^{2}). The racial makeup of the CDP was 56.01% White, 33.06% Native American, 0.81% from other races, and 10.12% from two or more races. Hispanic or Latino of any race were 2.16% of the population.

There were 279 households, out of which 36.6% had children under the age of 18 living with them, 65.2% were married couples living together, 7.9% had a female householder with no husband present, and 21.1% were non-families. 18.3% of all households were made up of individuals, and 6.5% had someone living alone who was 65 years of age or older. The average household size was 2.66 and the average family size was 2.98.

In the CDP, the population was spread out, with 26.3% under the age of 18, 8.9% from 18 to 24, 31.3% from 25 to 44, 25.2% from 45 to 64, and 8.2% who were 65 years of age or older. The median age was 36 years. For every 100 females, there were 105.8 males. For every 100 females age 18 and over, there were 101.5 males.

The median income for a household in the CDP was $27,391, and the median income for a family was $33,438. Males had a median income of $24,000 versus $18,214 for females. The per capita income for the CDP was $13,263. About 13.9% of families and 19.1% of the population were below the poverty line, including 20.5% of those under age 18 and 21.6% of those age 65 or over.
