= Sparrowhawk, Oklahoma =

- Census-designated place
- Location within Cherokee County and the state of Oklahoma
- Coordinates: 35°57′50″N 94°53′27″W
- Country: United States
- State: Oklahoma
- County: Cherokee

Area
  - Total: 5.56 sq mi (14.39 km^{2})
  - Land: 5.41 sq mi (14.00 km^{2})
  - Water: 0.15 sq mi (0.39 km^{2})
- Elevation: 915 ft (279 m)

Population (2020)
  - Total: 202
  - Density: 37.4/sq mi (14.43/km^{2})
- Time zone: UTC-6 (Central (CST))
  - Summer (DST): UTC-5 (CDT)
- FIPS code: 40-68951
- GNIS feature ID: 2409293

Sparrowhawk is an unincorporated community and census-designated place (CDP) in Cherokee County, Oklahoma, United States. The population was 202 as of the 2020 Census, up from the population of 191 reported as of the 2010 census, at which time the CDP was known as Scraper. The older name of the community was given for Captain Archibald Scraper of the 2nd Regiment, Indian Home Guard. Sparrowhawk takes its name from Sparrow Hawk Mountain, which occupies most of the CDP.

== Geography ==
Sparrowhawk is located in eastern Cherokee County along a large bend on the west side of the Illinois River. Much of the community is on top of Sparrow Hawk Mountain, a 1,080-foot-elevation (330 m) plateau that rises 360 feet (110 m) above the river. The CDP is bordered on the west by Oklahoma State Highway 10, which leads 6 miles (10 km) southwest to Tahlequah, the Cherokee County seat, and north 23 miles (37 km) to the town of Kansas.

According to the United States Census Bureau, the Sparrowhawk CDP has a total area of 5.6 square miles (14.4 km^{2}), of which 5.4 square miles (14.0 km^{2}) are land and 0.2 square miles (0.4 km^{2}), or 2.64%, are water.

== Demographics ==
Historical population
Census	Pop.	Note	%±
2000	475		—
2010	191		−59.8%
2020	202		5.8%
U.S. Decennial Census

=== 2020 census ===
As of the 2020 census, Sparrowhawk had a population of 202. The median age was 47.8 years. 15.8% of residents were under the age of 18 and 22.3% of residents were 65 years of age or older. For every 100 females there were 80.4 males, and for every 100 females age 18 and over there were 77.1 males age 18 and over.

0.0% of residents lived in urban areas, while 100.0% lived in rural areas.

There were 96 households in Sparrowhawk, of which 22.9% had children under the age of 18 living in them. Of all households, 32.3% were married-couple households, 13.5% were households with a male householder and no spouse or partner present, and 49.0% were households with a female householder and no spouse or partner present. About 40.7% of all households were made up of individuals and 18.7% had someone living alone who was 65 years of age or older.

There were 122 housing units, of which 21.3% were vacant. The homeowner vacancy rate was 0.0% and the rental vacancy rate was 17.9%.

Racial composition as of the 2020 census
Race	Number	Percent
White	109	54.0%
Black or African American	0	0.0%
American Indian and Alaska Native	58	28.7%
Asian	0	0.0%
Native Hawaiian and Other Pacific Islander	0	0.0%
Some other race	0	0.0%
Two or more races	35	17.3%
Hispanic or Latino (of any race)	5	2.5%

=== 2000 census ===
As of the census of 2000, there were 475 people, 189 households, and 137 families residing in the Scraper CDP. The population density was 9.2 people per square mile (3.6 people/km^{2}). There were 232 housing units at an average density of 4.5 units per square mile (1.7 units/km^{2}). The racial makeup of the CDP was 59.37% White, 1.26% African American, 32.42% Native American, 0.21% Asian, 0.84% from other races, and 5.89% from two or more races. Hispanic or Latino of any race were 1.47% of the population.

There were 189 households, out of which 28.0% had children under the age of 18 living with them, 60.8% were married couples living together, 9.0% had a female householder with no husband present, and 27.5% were non-families. 24.9% of all households were made up of individuals, and 9.0% had someone living alone who was 65 years of age or older. The average household size was 2.51 and the average family size was 2.96.

In the CDP, the population was spread out, with 24.2% under the age of 18, 6.3% from 18 to 24, 24.0% from 25 to 44, 27.4% from 45 to 64, and 18.1% who were 65 years of age or older. The median age was 43 years. For every 100 females, there were 91.5 males. For every 100 females age 18 and over, there were 81.8 males.

The median income for a household in the CDP was $29,018, and the median income for a family was $35,313. Males had a median income of $26,111 versus $24,500 for females. The per capita income for the CDP was $12,770. About 10.9% of families and 13.2% of the population were below the poverty line, including 13.9% of those under age 18 and 9.1% of those age 65 or over.

== Notable person ==
- Wilson Rawls, author of Where the Red Fern Grows and Summer of the Monkeys
