= Caney Creek (Scott County, Missouri) =

Stream in southeast Missouri, U.S.

Coordinates: 37°06′30″N 89°43′31″W

Caney Creek is a stream in Scott County in southeast Missouri. The stream headwaters arise northwest of Benton at . The stream flows east then turns to the northwest passing under U.S. Route 61 twice north of Benton. The stream flows west passing north of New Hamburg, under Missouri Route 77 and north of the community of Bleda (originally known as Caney Creek) and ends at in the Old Caney Basin at Drainage ditch #1.

Caney Creek was so named on account of canebrake near its course.

== See also ==
- List of rivers of Missouri
