= Grandview, Oklahoma =

Unincorporated community in Oklahoma, US

- Census-designated place
- Location within Oklahoma
- Coordinates: 35°57′48″N 94°59′52″W
- Country: United States
- State: Oklahoma
- County: Cherokee

Area
  - Total: 7.06 sq mi (18.28 km^{2})
  - Land: 7.05 sq mi (18.27 km^{2})
  - Water: 0 sq mi (0.00 km^{2})
- Elevation: 981 ft (299 m)

Population (2020)
  - Total: 1,321
  - Density: 187.2/sq mi (72.29/km^{2})
- Time zone: UTC-6 (Central (CST))
  - Summer (DST): UTC-5 (CST)
- FIPS code: 40-30915
- GNIS feature ID: 2584381

Grandview is an unincorporated area and census-designated place (CDP) in Cherokee County, Oklahoma, United States. As of the 2020 census, Grandview had a population of 1,321.

== Geography ==
Grandview is located near the center of Cherokee County, on the northwest border of Tahlequah, the Cherokee County seat. Oklahoma State Highway 51 Spur, a western bypass of Tahlequah, runs just southeast of the border of Grandview.

According to the United States Census Bureau, the Grandview CDP has a total area of 3.4 square miles (8.8 km^{2}), all land.

== Demographics ==
Historical population
Census	Pop.	Note	%±
2010	394		—
2020	1,321		235.3%
U.S. Decennial Census

=== 2020 census ===
As of the 2020 census, Grandview had a population of 1,321. The median age was 36.2 years. 29.3% of residents were under the age of 18 and 14.9% of residents were 65 years of age or older. For every 100 females there were 97.2 males, and for every 100 females age 18 and over there were 93.4 males age 18 and over.

0.0% of residents lived in urban areas, while 100.0% lived in rural areas.

There were 483 households in Grandview, of which 36.9% had children under the age of 18 living in them. Of all households, 53.6% were married-couple households, 15.7% were households with a male householder and no spouse or partner present, and 25.9% were households with a female householder and no spouse or partner present. About 21.6% of all households were made up of individuals and 10.7% had someone living alone who was 65 years of age or older.

There were 519 housing units, of which 6.9% were vacant. The homeowner vacancy rate was 0.7% and the rental vacancy rate was 5.6%.

Racial composition as of the 2020 census
Race	Number	Percent
White	445	33.7%
Black or African American	3	0.2%
American Indian and Alaska Native	577	43.7%
Asian	5	0.4%
Native Hawaiian and Other Pacific Islander	1	0.1%
Some other race	65	4.9%
Two or more races	225	17.0%
Hispanic or Latino (of any race)	144	10.9%
