= Tenkiller, Oklahoma =

Tenkiller, Oklahoma ᏍᎪᎯ ᏗᎯᎯ (Cherokee)
- Census-designated place
- Location within Cherokee County and the state of Oklahoma
- Coordinates: 35°47′38″N 94°51′14″W
- Country: United States
- State: Oklahoma
- County: Cherokee

Area
  - Total: 16.42 sq mi (42.54 km^{2})
  - Land: 15.67 sq mi (40.58 km^{2})
  - Water: 0.76 sq mi (1.96 km^{2})
- Elevation: 735 ft (224 m)

Population (2020)
  - Total: 390
  - Density: 24.9/sq mi (9.61/km^{2})
- Time zone: UTC-6 (Central (CST))
  - Summer (DST): UTC-5 (CDT)
- FIPS code: 40-72775
- GNIS feature ID: 2410066

Tenkiller (Cherokee: ᏍᎪᎯ ᏗᎯᎯ) is an unincorporated community and census-designated place (CDP) in Cherokee County, Oklahoma, United States. The population was 390 as of the 2020 Census.

== Geography ==
Tenkiller is located in southeastern Cherokee County. It is bordered to the north by Welling, to the west across the Illinois River by Park Hill and Keys, and to the east by Rocky Mountain in Adair County. The community of Dry Creek is a short distance to the south. Tahlequah, the county seat, is 13 miles (21 km) to the northwest via Welling Road.

According to the U.S. Census Bureau, the CDP has a total area of 20.0 square miles (51.8 km^{2}), of which 19.0 square miles (49.1 km^{2}) is land and 1.0 square mile (2.7 km^{2}), or 5.23%, is water. Tenkiller Ferry Lake on the Illinois River occupies the western border of the CDP.

== Demographics ==
Historical population
Census	Pop.	Note	%±
2020	390		—
U.S. Decennial Census

=== 2020 census ===
As of the 2020 census, Tenkiller had a population of 390. The median age was 40.9 years. 23.3% of residents were under the age of 18 and 13.1% of residents were 65 years of age or older. For every 100 females there were 105.3 males, and for every 100 females age 18 and over there were 107.6 males age 18 and over.

0.0% of residents lived in urban areas, while 100.0% lived in rural areas.

There were 110 households in Tenkiller, of which 25.5% had children under the age of 18 living in them. Of all households, 63.6% were married-couple households, 16.4% were households with a male householder and no spouse or partner present, and 13.6% were households with a female householder and no spouse or partner present. About 18.2% of all households were made up of individuals and 12.7% had someone living alone who was 65 years of age or older.

There were 133 housing units, of which 17.3% were vacant. The homeowner vacancy rate was 4.8% and the rental vacancy rate was 3.1%.

Racial composition as of the 2020 census
Race	Number	Percent
White	200	51.3%
Black or African American	14	3.6%
American Indian and Alaska Native	105	26.9%
Asian	3	0.8%
Native Hawaiian and Other Pacific Islander	0	0.0%
Some other race	0	0.0%
Two or more races	68	17.4%
Hispanic or Latino (of any race)	10	2.6%

=== 2000 census ===
As of the census of 2000, there were 549 people, 198 households, and 155 families residing in the CDP. The population density was 28.9 inhabitants per square mile (11.2/km^{2}). There were 230 housing units at an average density of 12.1/sq mi (4.7/km^{2}). The racial makeup of the CDP was 49.18% White, 1.82% African American, 38.43% Native American, 0.36% from other races, and 10.20% from two or more races. Hispanic or Latino of any race were 1.09% of the population.

There were 198 households, out of which 36.4% had children under the age of 18 living with them, 60.1% were married couples living together, 13.1% had a female householder with no husband present, and 21.7% were non-families. 18.7% of all households were made up of individuals, and 7.6% had someone living alone who was 65 years of age or older. The average household size was 2.77 and the average family size was 3.09.

In the CDP, the population was spread out, with 30.1% under the age of 18, 5.1% from 18 to 24, 29.1% from 25 to 44, 23.7% from 45 to 64, and 12.0% who were 65 years of age or older. The median age was 37 years. For every 100 females, there were 108.7 males. For every 100 females age 18 and over, there were 105.3 males.

The median income for a household in the CDP was $24,712, and the median income for a family was $26,618. Males had a median income of $21,250 versus $26,750 for females. The per capita income for the CDP was $12,366. About 11.4% of families and 21.0% of the population were below the poverty line, including 36.4% of those under age 18 and 6.1% of those age 65 or over.
