= Dry Creek, Oklahoma =

Unincorporated community in Oklahoma, US

- Census-designated place
- Location within Cherokee County and the state of Oklahoma
- Coordinates: 35°45′09″N 94°52′23″W
- Country: United States
- State: Oklahoma
- County: Cherokee

Area
  - Total: 8.70 sq mi (22.53 km^{2})
  - Land: 8.69 sq mi (22.51 km^{2})
  - Water: 0.0039 sq mi (0.01 km^{2})
- Elevation: 1,030 ft (310 m)

Population (2020)
  - Total: 233
  - Density: 26.8/sq mi (10.35/km^{2})
- Time zone: UTC-6 (Central (CST))
  - Summer (DST): UTC-5 (CST)
- FIPS code: 40-21755
- GNIS feature ID: 2408690

Dry Creek is an unincorporated community and census-designated place (CDP) in Cherokee County, Oklahoma, United States. As of the 2020 census, Dry Creek had a population of 233.

== Geography ==
Dry Creek is located in southeastern Cherokee County southeast of the head of Tenkiller Ferry Lake on the Illinois River. The CDP is bordered on the north and east by Dry Creek, an inlet to the lake; on the west by Oklahoma State Highway 82; and on the southwest by Elk Creek. Highway 82 leads north 14 miles (23 km) to Tahlequah, the Cherokee County seat, and south 22 miles (35 km) to Interstate 40 at Vian.

According to the United States Census Bureau, the Dry Creek CDP has a total area of 8.7 square miles (22.5 km^{2}), of which 0.004 square miles (0.01 km^{2}), or 0.07%, is water.

== Demographics ==
Historical population
Census	Pop.	Note	%±
2000	216		—
2010	227		5.1%
2020	233		2.6%
U.S. Decennial Census

=== 2020 census ===
As of the 2020 census, Dry Creek had a population of 233. The median age was 55.8 years. 10.3% of residents were under the age of 18 and 27.9% of residents were 65 years of age or older. For every 100 females there were 91.0 males, and for every 100 females age 18 and over there were 88.3 males age 18 and over.

0.0% of residents lived in urban areas, while 100.0% lived in rural areas.

There were 118 households in Dry Creek, of which 16.9% had children under the age of 18 living in them. Of all households, 37.3% were married-couple households, 18.6% were households with a male householder and no spouse or partner present, and 39.0% were households with a female householder and no spouse or partner present. About 45.0% of all households were made up of individuals and 23.7% had someone living alone who was 65 years of age or older.

There were 170 housing units, of which 30.6% were vacant. The homeowner vacancy rate was 0.0% and the rental vacancy rate was 0.0%.

Racial composition as of the 2020 census
Race	Number	Percent
White	132	56.7%
Black or African American	0	0.0%
American Indian and Alaska Native	68	29.2%
Asian	1	0.4%
Native Hawaiian and Other Pacific Islander	0	0.0%
Some other race	0	0.0%
Two or more races	32	13.7%
Hispanic or Latino (of any race)	3	1.3%

=== 2000 census ===
As of the census of 2000, there were 216 people, 97 households, and 67 families residing in the CDP. The population density was 24.8 people per square mile (9.6/km^{2}). There were 153 housing units at an average density of 17.6/sq mi (6.8/km^{2}). The racial makeup of the CDP was 64.81% White, 0.93% African American, 30.56% Native American, and 3.70% from two or more races. Hispanic or Latino of any race were 1.85% of the population.

There were 97 households, out of which 20.6% had children under the age of 18 living with them, 54.6% were married couples living together, 9.3% had a female householder with no husband present, and 30.9% were non-families. 24.7% of all households were made up of individuals, and 17.5% had someone living alone who was 65 years of age or older. The average household size was 2.23 and the average family size was 2.54.

In the CDP, the population was spread out, with 19.9% under the age of 18, 6.9% from 18 to 24, 19.4% from 25 to 44, 26.4% from 45 to 64, and 27.3% who were 65 years of age or older. The median age was 51 years. For every 100 females, there were 87.8 males. For every 100 females age 18 and over, there were 88.0 males.

The median income for a household in the CDP was $27,292, and the median income for a family was $28,523. Males had a median income of $19,643 versus $22,083 for females. The per capita income for the CDP was $14,186. About 14.7% of families and 22.5% of the population were below the poverty line, including 48.8% of those under the age of eighteen and 8.9% of those 65 or over.
