= Pettit, Oklahoma =

Unincorporated community in Oklahoma, US

- Census-designated place
- Location within Cherokee County and the state of Oklahoma
- Coordinates: 35°45′21″N 95°00′30″W
- Country: United States
- State: Oklahoma
- County: Cherokee
- Named for: Mark and Eliza Pettit

Area
  - Total: 11.23 sq mi (29.09 km^{2})
  - Land: 11.22 sq mi (29.05 km^{2})
  - Water: 0.015 sq mi (0.04 km^{2})
- Elevation: 715 ft (218 m)

Population (2020)
  - Total: 829
  - Density: 73.9/sq mi (28.54/km^{2})
- Time zone: UTC-6 (Central (CST))
  - Summer (DST): UTC-5 (CDT)
- ZIP code: 74451
- Area codes: 539/918
- FIPS code: 40-58400
- GNIS feature ID: 2409058

Pettit is an unincorporated community and census-designated place (CDP) in Cherokee County, Oklahoma, United States. As of the 2020 census, Pettit had a population of 829. The town was named for Mark and Eliza Pettit, townsite allottees.

== Geography ==
According to the United States Census Bureau, the CDP has a total area of 11.6 square miles (30 km^{2}), all land.

The community borders Lake Tenkiller on the southeast, and Pettit Bay Public Use Area is across the lake from Pettit.

== Demographics ==
Historical population
Census	Pop.	Note	%±
2000	771		—
2010	954		23.7%
2020	829		−13.1%
U.S. Decennial Census

=== 2020 census ===
As of the 2020 census, Pettit had a population of 829. The median age was 45.9 years. 22.4% of residents were under the age of 18 and 22.7% of residents were 65 years of age or older. For every 100 females there were 96.9 males, and for every 100 females age 18 and over there were 92.5 males age 18 and over.

0.0% of residents lived in urban areas, while 100.0% lived in rural areas.

There were 324 households in Pettit, of which 17.9% had children under the age of 18 living in them. Of all households, 50.9% were married-couple households, 21.9% were households with a male householder and no spouse or partner present, and 23.5% were households with a female householder and no spouse or partner present. About 33.3% of all households were made up of individuals and 15.7% had someone living alone who was 65 years of age or older.

There were 516 housing units, of which 37.2% were vacant. The homeowner vacancy rate was 5.0% and the rental vacancy rate was 16.3%.

Racial composition as of the 2020 census
Race	Number	Percent
White	456	55.0%
Black or African American	6	0.7%
American Indian and Alaska Native	224	27.0%
Asian	1	0.1%
Native Hawaiian and Other Pacific Islander	0	0.0%
Some other race	4	0.5%
Two or more races	138	16.6%
Hispanic or Latino (of any race)	20	2.4%

=== 2000 census ===
As of the census of 2000, there were 771 people, 329 households, and 227 families residing in the CDP. The population density was 66.6 inhabitants per square mile (25.7/km^{2}). There were 459 housing units at an average density of 39.7 per square mile (15.3/km^{2}). The racial makeup of the CDP was 64.46% White, 0.13% African American, 24.38% Native American, 0.13% from other races, and 10.89% from two or more races. Hispanic or Latino of any race were 1.04% of the population.

There were 329 households, out of which 27.7% had children under the age of 18 living with them, 57.1% were married couples living together, 8.5% had a female householder with no husband present, and 31.0% were non-families. 27.1% of all households were made up of individuals, and 10.6% had someone living alone who was 65 years of age or older. The average household size was 2.34 and the average family size was 2.84.

In the CDP, the population was spread out, with 22.7% under the age of 18, 6.2% from 18 to 24, 25.9% from 25 to 44, 28.1% from 45 to 64, and 17.0% who were 65 years of age or older. The median age was 42 years. For every 100 females, there were 104.5 males. For every 100 females age 18 and over, there were 104.8 males.

The median income for a household in the CDP was $25,766, and the median income for a family was $26,806. Males had a median income of $25,536 versus $21,250 for females. The per capita income for the CDP was $14,432. About 12.7% of families and 15.3% of the population were below the poverty line, including 20.5% of those under age 18 and 8.9% of those age 65 or over.
