= Eldon, Oklahoma =

Unincorporated community in Oklahoma, US

- Census-designated place
- Location within Cherokee County and the state of Oklahoma
- Coordinates: 35°55′50″N 94°49′05″W
- Country: United States
- State: Oklahoma
- County: Cherokee

Area
  - Total: 9.15 sq mi (23.69 km^{2})
  - Land: 8.96 sq mi (23.21 km^{2})
  - Water: 0.19 sq mi (0.48 km^{2})
- Elevation: 925 ft (282 m)

Population (2020)
  - Total: 347
  - Density: 38.7/sq mi (14.95/km^{2})
- Time zone: UTC-6 (Central (CST))
  - Summer (DST): UTC-5 (CDT)
- FIPS code: 40-23300
- GNIS feature ID: 2408068

Eldon is an unincorporated community and census-designated place (CDP) in Cherokee County, Oklahoma, United States. As of the 2020 census, Eldon had a population of 347. It lies east of Tahlequah at the junction of U.S. Highway 62 and State Highway 51. The Eldon Post Office existed from March 20, 1911, until May 30, 1936. The community is said to have been named for Eldon, Illinois.

== Geography ==
Eldon is located along the eastern edge of Cherokee County in the valley of the Baron Fork of the Illinois River. U.S. Route 62 leads west 8 miles (13 km) to Tahlequah and east 20 miles (32 km) to Westville near the Arkansas border. State Highway 51 leads southeast from Eldon 16 miles (26 km) to Stilwell.

Eldon is bordered to the south by the CDP of Welling and to the east by Adair County.

According to the United States Census Bureau, the Eldon CDP has a total area of 9.2 square miles (23.7 km^{2}), of which 9.0 square miles (23.4 km^{2}) is land and 0.15 square miles (0.4 km^{2}), or 1.50%, is water. The Census Bureau reduced the area recorded as Eldon to its current boundaries from 18.5 square miles (48 km^{2}) as of the 2000 census.

== Demographics ==
Historical population
Census	Pop.	Note	%±
2000	991		—
2010	368		−62.9%
2020	347		−5.7%
U.S. Decennial Census

=== 2020 census ===
As of the 2020 census, Eldon had a population of 347. The median age was 46.5 years. 24.2% of residents were under the age of 18 and 25.4% of residents were 65 years of age or older. For every 100 females there were 102.9 males, and for every 100 females age 18 and over there were 112.1 males age 18 and over.

0.0% of residents lived in urban areas, while 100.0% lived in rural areas.

There were 142 households in Eldon, of which 28.2% had children under the age of 18 living in them. Of all households, 40.8% were married-couple households, 26.1% were households with a male householder and no spouse or partner present, and 24.6% were households with a female householder and no spouse or partner present. About 26.7% of all households were made up of individuals and 7.0% had someone living alone who was 65 years of age or older.

There were 154 housing units, of which 7.8% were vacant. The homeowner vacancy rate was 0.0% and the rental vacancy rate was 4.2%.

Racial composition as of the 2020 census
Race	Number	Percent
White	128	36.9%
Black or African American	1	0.3%
American Indian and Alaska Native	155	44.7%
Asian	0	0.0%
Native Hawaiian and Other Pacific Islander	0	0.0%
Some other race	1	0.3%
Two or more races	62	17.9%
Hispanic or Latino (of any race)	13	3.7%

=== 2010 census ===
As of the census of 2010, there were 368 people residing in Eldon. The population density was 20 people per square mile (7.7/km^{2}). There were 155 housing units. The racial makeup of the CDP was 40.67% White, 0.10% African American, 50.45% Native American, 0.30% from other races, and 8.48% from two or more races. Hispanic or Latino of any race were 0.50% of the population.

There were 136 households, out of which 40.1% had children under the age of 18 living with them, 56.6% were married couples living together, 12.6% had a female householder with no husband present, and 26.1% were non-families. 21.6% of all households were made up of individuals, and 6.4% had someone living alone who was 65 years of age or older. The average household size was 2.78 and the average family size was 3.24.

In the CDP, the population was spread out, with 31.0% under the age of 18, 8.6% from 18 to 24, 30.1% from 25 to 44, 21.2% from 45 to 64, and 9.2% who were 65 years of age or older. The median age was 33 years. For every 100 females, there were 92.1 males. For every 100 females age 18 and over, there were 95.4 males.

The median income for a household in the CDP was $25,086, and the median income for a family was $26,207. Males had a median income of $18,578 versus $19,500 for females. The per capita income for the CDP was $11,125. About 20.6% of families and 25.5% of the population were below the poverty line, including 43.8% of those under age 18 and 18.4% of those age 65 or over.
