= Cookson, Oklahoma =

Unincorporated community in Oklahoma, US

- Unincorporated community
- Location within the state of Oklahoma Cookson (the United States)
- Coordinates: 35°42′56″N 94°55′11″W
- Country: United States
- State: Oklahoma
- County: Cherokee

Area
  - Total: 15.34 sq mi (39.74 km^{2})
  - Land: 12.87 sq mi (33.34 km^{2})
  - Water: 2.47 sq mi (6.41 km^{2})
- Elevation: 853 ft (260 m)

Population (2020)
  - Total: 826
  - Density: 64.2/sq mi (24.78/km^{2})
- Time zone: UTC-6 (Central (CST))
  - Summer (DST): UTC-5 (CDT)
- ZIP codes: 74427
- Area code: (918)
- FIPS code: 40-16950
- GNIS feature ID: 2805311

Cookson is a community and census-designated place in the Cookson Hills of Cherokee County, Oklahoma, United States. The population was 826 as of the 2020 Census. The post office opened April 11, 1895. The ZIP Code is 74427. It is said to have been named for the first postmaster, John H. Cookson.

== Demographics ==
Historical population
Census	Pop.	Note	%±
2020	826		—
U.S. Decennial Census

=== 2020 census ===
As of the 2020 census, Cookson had a population of 826. The median age was 56.1 years. 15.9% of residents were under the age of 18 and 31.6% of residents were 65 years of age or older. For every 100 females there were 123.2 males, and for every 100 females age 18 and over there were 119.2 males age 18 and over.

0.0% of residents lived in urban areas, while 100.0% lived in rural areas.

There were 380 households in Cookson, of which 23.7% had children under the age of 18 living in them. Of all households, 53.2% were married-couple households, 18.7% were households with a male householder and no spouse or partner present, and 21.6% were households with a female householder and no spouse or partner present. About 25.3% of all households were made up of individuals and 13.4% had someone living alone who was 65 years of age or older.

There were 680 housing units, of which 44.1% were vacant. The homeowner vacancy rate was 1.2% and the rental vacancy rate was 18.8%.

Racial composition as of the 2020 census
Race	Number	Percent
White	477	57.7%
Black or African American	3	0.4%
American Indian and Alaska Native	231	28.0%
Asian	1	0.1%
Native Hawaiian and Other Pacific Islander	0	0.0%
Some other race	0	0.0%
Two or more races	114	13.8%
Hispanic or Latino (of any race)	20	2.4%

== Sources ==
- Shirk, George H. Oklahoma Place Names. Norman: University of Oklahoma Press, 1987. ISBN 0-8061-2028-2 .
