= Summer of the Monkeys =

1976 children's story by Wilson Rawls

- First edition
- Author: Wilson Rawls
- Language: English
- Genre: Children's novel
- Publisher: Doubleday
- Publication date: 1976
- Publication place: United States
- Media type: Print (Hardback & Paperback)
- Pages: 283
- ISBN: 0-440-41580-2

Summer of the Monkeys is a 1976 children's story written by Wilson Rawls. It was published by Doubleday (later released by Yearling Books) and was the winner of the William Allen White Book Award and the California Young Reader Medal.

== Plot summary ==
The book is set about the end of the nineteenth century. The protagonist is a 14-year-old boy named Jay Berry Lee, who had enjoyed an idyllic, nature-based if impoverished childhood. Born to Missouri sharecroppers, he moves with his family to Oklahoma after his grandfather offers them free land. Daisy, his sister, has a crippled leg, and they devote much effort to gaining enough money to pay for reconstructive surgery. One day, while looking for their lost milk cow, Jay Berry discovers monkeys in a nearby river bottom. Visiting his grandfather's store, he learns that they have escaped from a traveling circus, which has offered a vast reward for their capture: $100 for the chief monkey, "Jimbo", and $2 each for the others. Jay Berry makes multiple attempts to capture them using traps and a net borrowed from his grandfather, but he gains only scratches and bites from them, at one point even losing his britches in the process.

Jay Berry's grandfather contacts the circus and is advised to attempt to befriend Jimbo. Jay Berry decides to go look for them and he finds them around a hidden still; the drunken monkeys indeed befriend him, but their gesture of friendship is a gift of whiskey that leaves him drunk. After returning to his shocked family, he goes with his grandfather to a nearby town to visit the library and discover alternate methods of monkey-catching. Having bought supplies such as coconuts and necessary supplies for Daisy and the rest of the family, they return home, but the monkeys steal it all.

Daisy discovers a fairy ring that the family believes can make wishes come true. Jay Berry, despite an intense but unrealistic desire to own a horse and a .22 (because of the family's financial situation, and the cunning ability of the monkeys to evade capture) secretly wishes that his sister's leg would be made well. Unbeknownst to Jay Berry (and the reader), Daisy wishes for her brother to get his coveted pony and gun.

Soon afterward, a fierce storm frightens the monkeys into accompanying him into captivity, and he quickly returns them to the circus for his reward. Although he considers buying the pony and rifle, he chooses to finance Daisy's surgery to fix her crippled leg instead. In the end, Daisy's surgery expenses were less than expected, and with grandpa's negotiation skills, Jay Berry has enough money left over to get the .22 gun and pony he had long desired.

== Film adaptation ==
The book was adapted into the 1998 film of the same name directed by Michael Anderson and starring Corey Sevier as Jay Berry Lee, a young boy who discovers circus monkeys living in the forest near his home. The movie also stars Michael Ontkean and Leslie Hope as Jay Berry's parents, as well as Katie Stuart, Don Francks, and Wilford Brimley. It received a limited theatrical release in both Canada and the United States in 1998 and was released on home video in the United States by Walt Disney Home Video, a subsidiary of Buena Vista Home Entertainment, Inc.
