= Wilson Rawls =

American children's writer

Woodrow Wilson Rawls
- Born: September 24, 1913; Scraper, Oklahoma
- Died: December 16, 1984 (aged 71); Marshfield, Wisconsin
- Occupation: Author
- Spouse: Sophie Ann Styczinski
- Writing career
- Genre: Children's novels

Woodrow Wilson Rawls (September 24, 1913 – December 16, 1984) was an American writer best known for his books Where the Red Fern Grows and Summer of the Monkeys.

== Early years ==
Woodrow Wilson Rawls was born in the Ozark Mountains near Scraper, Oklahoma in 1913, to parents Minzy Rawls and Winnie Hatfield Rawls. His family's farm was located on his mother's Cherokee government allotment. When Rawls was 16, the United States economy entered the Great Depression, prompting his family to leave their Oklahoma home for California; however, the family's convertible broke down near Albuquerque, New Mexico, where Rawls's father found a job at the nearby toothpaste factory. Despite his sporadic formal education, Rawls was taught to read by his mother and developed a love of books after reading the wilderness adventure novels of Jack London.

In the 1930s and 1940s, Rawls became a carpenter and traveled to South America, Canada, and Alaska. He wrote five manuscripts during this period, including an early version of Where the Red Fern Grows. Rawls's scripts contained many spelling and grammatical errors and no punctuation. Because of this, he kept the manuscripts hidden in a trunk in his father's workshop.

Rawls served time in prison twice while in Oklahoma. According to the Bear Grease podcast, Episode 42, Rawls was convicted of stealing chickens in 1933 and spent 18 months in prison. In New Mexico, in 1940, he again served time for breaking and entering and was sentenced to two to three years. During this term in prison, he worked to refine his writing skills, though he still felt that his lack of formal education meant that the novels were not fit for publication.

In the late 1950s, Rawls worked for a construction company on a guided missile range in the Southwest. Later, he transferred to a construction site near Idaho Falls to work on a contract for the Atomic Energy Commission. Rawls lived in a cabin near Mud Lake. While working there, Rawls met his future wife, Sophie Ann Styczinski, a budget analyst for the Atomic Energy Commission. The couple married on August 23, 1958.

Prior to his marriage, Rawls burned all his hidden manuscripts, embarrassed for his wife to read them. Learning of this, Sophie encouraged Rawls to recreate one of the stories. Rawls allegedly completed the 35,000 word manuscript in three weeks; once again, he didn't use any punctuation. Sophie assisted Rawls in punctuating and editing the manuscript. In 1961, the story was submitted it to the Saturday Evening Post, which published it in three parts under the title "The Hounds of Youth". Doubleday purchased the story and published it as Where the Red Fern Grows.

== Novels ==
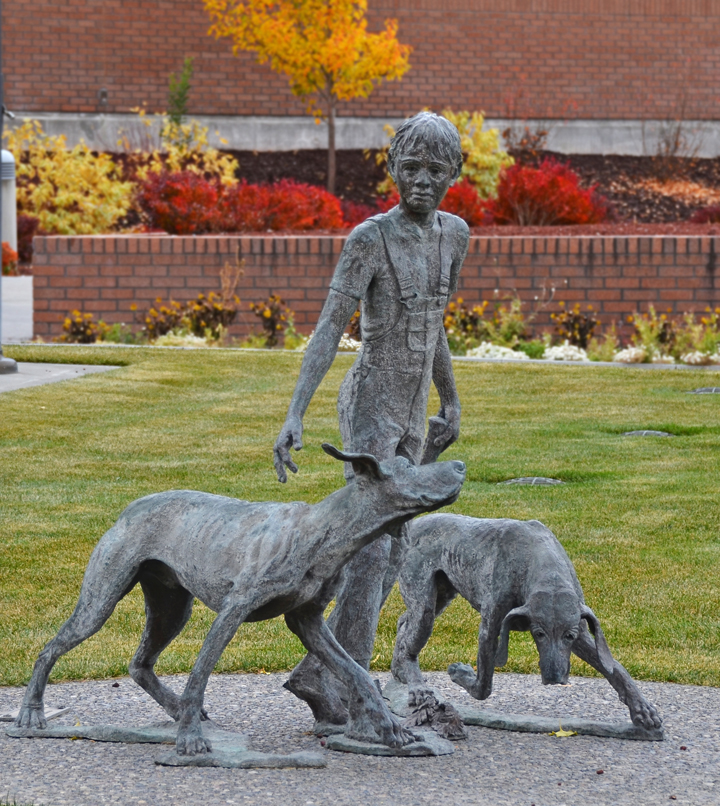
Statue of characters in Where The Red Fern Grows at the Public Library in Idaho Falls, Idaho. Entitled "Dreams Can Come True" Wilson Rawls author of Where The Red Fern Grows.’ Sculpture by Marilyn Hoff Hansen.

=== Novels ===
- Where the Red Fern Grows (1961)
- Summer of the Monkeys (1976)

=== Audiobooks ===
- Where the Red Fern Grows (1989)
- Summer of the Monkeys (1976)

== Awards and recognition ==
Where the Red Fern Grows:

- Evansville Book Award, Division III, Evansville-Vanderburgh School Corporation (1974)
- Young Readers Award, Division II, Michigan Council of Teachers of English, Michigan (1980)
- Flicker Tale Children's Book Award for the Older Child, North Dakota (1981)
- 12th Annual Children's Book Award, Massachusetts (1987)
- Great Stone Face Award, New Hampshire (1988)

Summer of the Monkeys:

- Sequoyah Children's Book Award, Oklahoma Library Association (1979)
- William Allen White Children's Book Award, Kansas (1979)
- Golden Archer Award, University of Wisconsin (1979)
- Maud Hart Lovelace Award, Minnesota (1980)
- Young Reader Medal, California of Teachers of English (1981)
