= Where the Red Fern Grows =

1961 book by Wilson Rawls

- First edition hardback cover
- Author: Wilson Rawls
- Language: English
- Genre: Children's novel
- Publisher: Doubleday
- Publication date: 1961
- Publication place: United States
- Media type: Print (hardcover)
- Pages: 245
- ISBN: 0-440-22814-X
- OCLC: 39850615

Where the Red Fern Grows is a 1961 children's novel by Wilson Rawls about a boy who buys and trains two Redbone Coonhounds for hunting. It is a work of autobiographical fiction based on Rawls' childhood in the Ozarks.

== Plot ==
The novel starts in 1961 when a middle-aged man named Billy Colman rescues a Redbone Coonhound from neighborhood dogs and takes it home to recover. The incident reminds him of the faithful dogs he owned as a boy in the Ozarks.

The story then travels decades prior to a ten-year-old Billy seeking a pair of redbone coonhounds for coon hunting. After seeing a magazine ad for them, he spends the next two years working odd jobs to earn the $50 he needs to buy a pair and walks 20 miles to Tahlequah to retrieve them. As he returns with them, he sees the names "Dan + Ann" carved on a tree and names them Old Dan and Little Ann. With his grandfather's help, he trains them to hunt.

On the first night of hunting season, Billy promises Old Dan and Little Ann that if they tree a raccoon, he will do the rest. They do so in a huge sycamore tree, which he believes is far too large to cut down. Remembering his promise, he spends the next two days attempting to cut it down. Exhausted, he prays for the strength to continue, whereupon a strong wind blows it down.

Billy, Old Dan, and Little Ann become renowned as the best hunters in the Ozarks. His grandfather bets Rubin and Rainie Pritchard that Old Dan and Little Ann can tree the legendary "ghost coon" that has evaded hunters for years. After a challenging hunt, Old Dan and Little Ann succeed in doing so, but Billy, having seen how old and clever it is, decides not to kill it. He tries to prevent Rubin and Rainie from killing it, and this leads to a brawl with Rubin. During the fight, Rubin and Rainie's dog, Old Blue, attacks Billy, prompting Old Dan and Little Ann to come to his aid. Rubin attempts to scare them away with his axe, but he falls on it and is killed. Although Billy is deeply troubled by the tragic turn of events, he does not regret his decision to spare the ghost coon.

Billy's grandfather enters him in a championship raccoon hunt against experienced hunters. It is scheduled during a particularly cold week, and many of the hunters give up. Billy, who is used to harsh mountain winters, can reach the final round. On the last night, Old Dan and Little Ann trap three raccoons in a single tree, but a sudden blizzard forces Billy to take shelter. The following morning, Old Dan and Little Ann are found covered with ice but still circling the tree. All three raccoons are captured and Billy wins the championship and a $300 prize.

One night while the trio is hunting, a mountain lion attacks Old Dan and Little Ann. Billy fights to save them, but the mountain lion turns on him. Old Dan and Little Ann kill it, saving his life, but Old Dan later dies of his injuries. Over the next few days, Little Ann loses the will to live and finally dies of sadness and starvation, leaving Billy heartbroken.

Billy's father tries to comfort him by explaining that he and Billy's mother had long wished to move to a town where he and his sisters can get an education, but could not afford to do so without the extra money brought in by his hunting. Knowing that Old Dan and Little Ann would suffer in town and that he would be devastated to leave them behind, they intended to allow him to remain in the mountains with his grandfather. His father believes that God took Old Dan and Little Ann as a sign that the family was meant to stay together.

On his last day in the Ozarks, Billy visits Old Dan and Little Ann's graves and finds a giant red fern growing between them. Remembering a legend that only an angel can plant the seeds of one, he also comes to believe the Lord Himself was at work.

Billy closes by saying that although he has never returned to the Ozarks, he still dreams of visiting Old Dan and Little Ann's graves and seeing the red fern again.

== Films ==
The novel was adapted into a 1974 film starring Stewart Petersen, James Whitmore, Beverly Garland, and Jack Ging. A sequel was released in 1992, starring Wilford Brimley, Chad McQueen, Lisa Whelchel, and Karen Carlson. In 2003, a remake film was released, starring Joseph Ashton, Dabney Coleman, Ned Beatty, and Dave Matthews.

== Reception ==
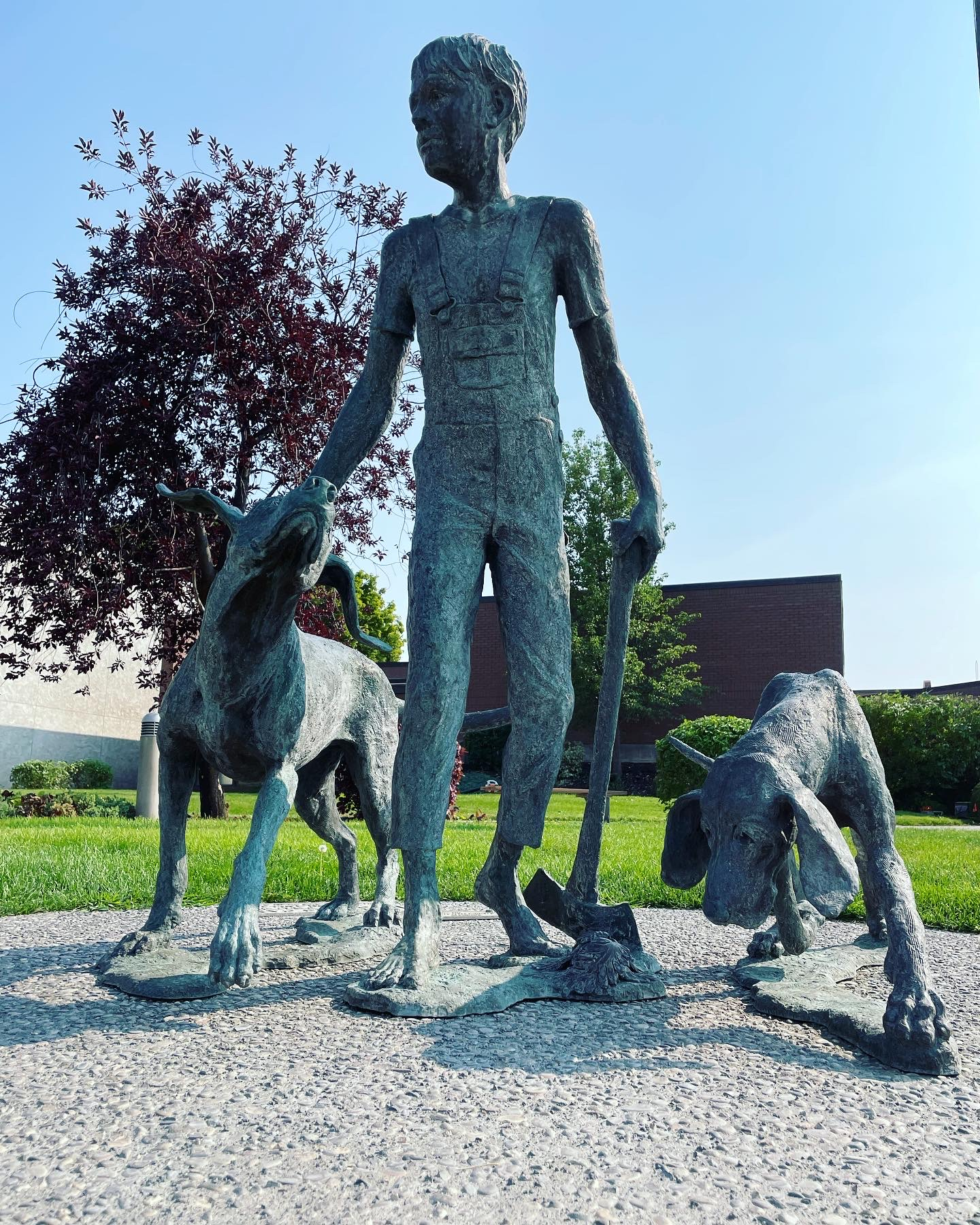
Where the Red Fern Grows Statue at the Idaho Falls Public Library

Although sales of the novel began slowly, by 1974 over 90,000 copies had been sold. In 2001, Publishers Weekly estimated that it had sold 6,754,308 copies.

There is a statue of Billy, Old Dan, and Little Ann at the Idaho Falls Public Library.

== Characters in the book ==
- Billy Coleman, a ten-year-old (soon twelve-year-old) boy who lives in the Ozark Mountains of Oklahoma
- Old Dan, Billy's male dog
- Little Ann, Billy's female dog
- Mama, Billy's mother
- Papa, Billy's father who buys him the traps and teaches him how to use them
- Grandpa, Billy's grandfather and owner of the country general store
- Billy's Three sisters
- Rubin Pritchard, who is killed by an axe injury after he attempts to attack Old Dan and Little Ann
- Rainie Pritchard, Rubin's younger brother and a troublemaker. He idolizes Rubin; when Rubin is killed, he is devastated.
- The Marshal of Tahlequah
- Old Man Hatfield, a neighbor of Billy's
- Mr. Kyle, a coon hunter
- Mr. Benson, another coon hunter
- Samie Billy's cat
- Dr. Lathman, another coon hunter

== See also ==
- Sceptridium biternatum, a fern with leaves and stems that turn a reddish-brown/bronze color in the fall; known locally as a “red fern”
