= Welling, Oklahoma =

- Census-designated place
- Location within Cherokee County and the state of Oklahoma
- Coordinates: 35°51′50″N 94°50′37″W
- Country: United States
- State: Oklahoma
- County: Cherokee

Area
  - Total: 25.44 sq mi (65.90 km^{2})
  - Land: 25.18 sq mi (65.21 km^{2})
  - Water: 0.26 sq mi (0.68 km^{2})
- Elevation: 705 ft (215 m)

Population (2020)
  - Total: 781
  - Density: 31.0/sq mi (11.98/km^{2})
- Time zone: UTC-6 (Central (CST))
  - Summer (DST): UTC-5 (CDT)
- ZIP code: 74471
- Area codes: 539/918
- FIPS code: 40-79850
- GNIS feature ID: 2409541

Welling is an unincorporated community and census-designated place (CDP) in Cherokee County, Oklahoma, United States. As of the 2020 census, Welling had a population of 781. It is home to The Salvation Army's Heart o' Hills camp and conference center.

== Geography ==
Welling is located in eastern Cherokee County approximately four miles southeast of Tahlequah. The Illinois River flows past two miles to the west and the north end of Tenkiller Ferry Lake is three miles south.

According to the United States Census Bureau, the CDP has a total area of 29.6 square miles (76.7 km^{2}), of which 29.5 square miles (76.3 km^{2}) is land and 0.15 square miles (0.4 km^{2}), or 0.50%, is water.

== Demographics ==
Historical population
Census	Pop.	Note	%±
2000	669		—
2010	771		15.2%
2020	781		1.3%
U.S. Decennial Census

=== 2020 census ===
As of the 2020 census, Welling had a population of 781. The median age was 41.5 years. 23.8% of residents were under the age of 18 and 16.8% of residents were 65 years of age or older. For every 100 females there were 114.6 males, and for every 100 females age 18 and over there were 108.8 males age 18 and over.

0.0% of residents lived in urban areas, while 100.0% lived in rural areas.

There were 295 households in Welling, of which 30.8% had children under the age of 18 living in them. Of all households, 54.6% were married-couple households, 18.6% were households with a male householder and no spouse or partner present, and 22.0% were households with a female householder and no spouse or partner present. About 24.8% of all households were made up of individuals and 11.2% had someone living alone who was 65 years of age or older.

There were 331 housing units, of which 10.9% were vacant. The homeowner vacancy rate was 0.8% and the rental vacancy rate was 13.2%.

Racial composition as of the 2020 census
Race	Number	Percent
White	329	42.1%
Black or African American	1	0.1%
American Indian and Alaska Native	277	35.5%
Asian	7	0.9%
Native Hawaiian and Other Pacific Islander	1	0.1%
Some other race	7	0.9%
Two or more races	159	20.4%
Hispanic or Latino (of any race)	22	2.8%

=== 2000 census ===
As of the census of 2000, there were 669 people, 247 households, and 187 families residing in the CDP. The population density was 22.6 people per square mile (8.7/km^{2}). There were 306 housing units at an average density of 10.3/sq mi (4.0/km^{2}). The racial makeup of the CDP was 53.36% White, 38.57% Native American, 0.15% Asian, and 7.92% from two or more races. Hispanic or Latino of any race were 2.69% of the population.

There were 247 households, out of which 39.7% had children under the age of 18 living with them, 61.9% were married couples living together, 9.7% had a female householder with no husband present, and 23.9% were non-families. 21.1% of all households were made up of individuals, and 7.3% had someone living alone who was 65 years of age or older. The average household size was 2.71 and the average family size was 3.13.

In the CDP, the population was spread out, with 29.4% under the age of 18, 11.2% from 18 to 24, 25.9% from 25 to 44, 23.3% from 45 to 64, and 10.2% who were 65 years of age or older. The median age was 33 years. For every 100 females, there were 96.8 males. For every 100 females age 18 and over, there were 102.6 males.

The median income for a household in the CDP was $24,118, and the median income for a family was $28,500. Males had a median income of $25,938 versus $19,375 for females. The per capita income for the CDP was $16,859. About 21.7% of families and 27.8% of the population were below the poverty line, including 34.8% of those under age 18 and 26.5% of those age 65 or over.

== Notable people ==
- Agnes Cowen (1927–1999), member of the Cherokee Nation Tribal Council
