= Illinois River (Arkansas–Oklahoma) =

Scenic Ozark river in Arkansas and Oklahoma

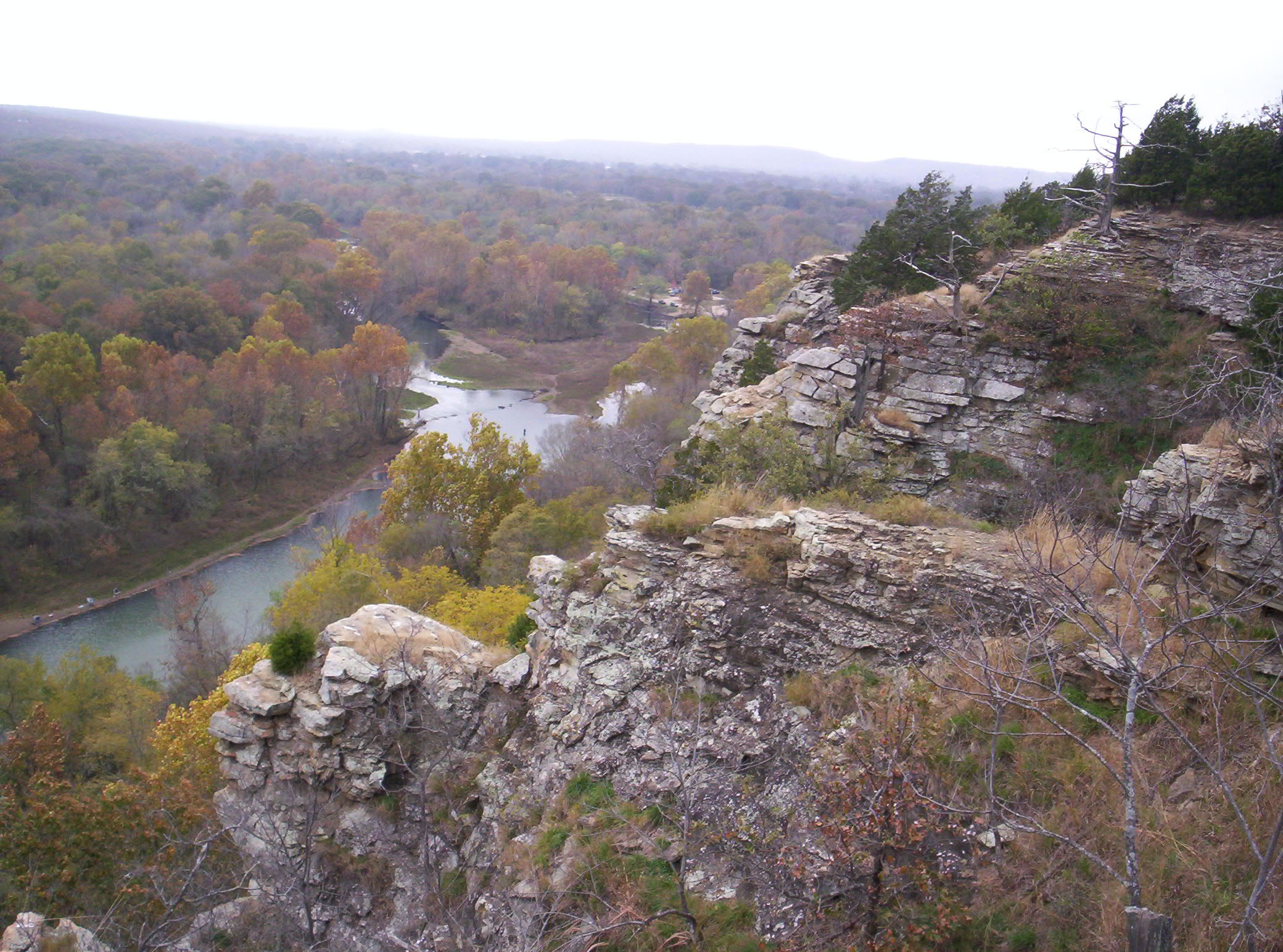
- The Illinois River, seen here in the upper stretches of Tenkiller Ferry Lake

Location
- Country: United States
- States: Arkansas, Oklahoma

Physical characteristics
- Source
  - location: Ozark Mountains
  - coordinates: 35°51′08″N 94°17′23″W
- Mouth
  - location: Arkansas River
  - coordinates: 35°29′21″N 95°05′52″W
  - elevation: 459 ft (140 m)
- Length: 98.8 mi (159.0 km)
- Discharge
  - location: Gore
  - average: 1,551 cu ft/s (43.9 m^{3}/s)

The Illinois River is a 145-mile-long (233 km) tributary of the Arkansas River in the U.S. states of Arkansas and Oklahoma. The Osage Indians named it Ne-eng-wah-kon-dah, which translates as "Medicine Stone River". The state of Oklahoma has designated its portion as a Scenic River.

== History ==
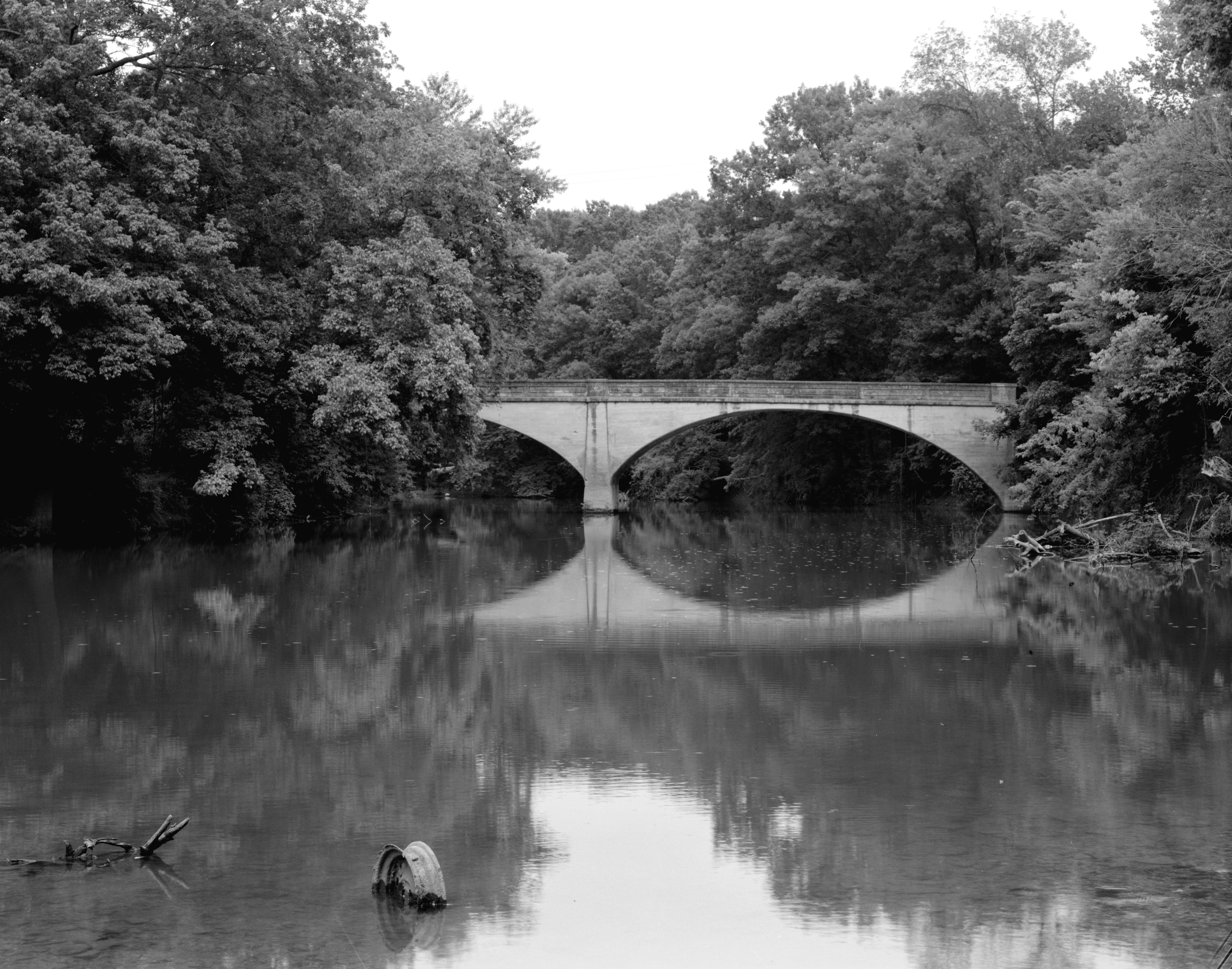
Eastern (upstream) side of the Illinois River Bridge, which spans the Illinois River east of Siloam Springs in the Ozark National Forest portion of Benton County, Arkansas, United States. Built in 1922, this concrete deck arch bridge is listed on the National Register of Historic Places.

An unidentified French explorer called this body of water "rivière des Illinois" after the Illinois Indians who were not, however, usually present in this area. Rather, the earliest known inhabitants were descendants of Caddoans who built the Spiro Mounds at Spiro, Oklahoma. In the 18th century, the Illinois River country was a hunting ground for the Osage Indians. Cherokee began to migrate into the area about 1800. U. S. Army Major James Wilkinson reported passing the mouth of this river in 1806. In 1828, the river was designated as a main waterway for the Cherokees

The Illinois Confederation included the Peoria, Miami, Wei and Kaskaskia tribes. These tribes shared similar language culture and customs and were all classified as Algonquin. The Miami word Ilaniawaki, meaning "real or original ones," became the French term Illinois. During the American Civil War, Confederate Major General Thomas C. Hindman fought the Battle of Prairie Grove, tactically a tie but strategically a Union victory on December 7, 1862 along the Arkansas section of the Illinois River. This battle effectively ended any major attempt by the Confederates to retake Missouri.

Lake Tenkiller, created by damming the Illinois River beginning in 1947 with completion in 1953, has attracted tourists and fishermen to this once sparsely settled area. Seventy miles of the river between Lake Tenkiller and the Arkansas border, flowing through the Cookson Hills, have been supervised by the Oklahoma Scenic Rivers Commission, currently headed by Ed Fite since 1970.

== Description ==
The spring-fed river rises in the Ozark Mountains in the northwest corner of Arkansas, in Washington County southwest of Fayetteville, near the communities of Hogeye and Onda. The stream flows north parallel to Arkansas Highway 265 then turns northwest passing under U.S. Route 62 northeast of Prairie Grove. It continues north-northwest passing under Arkansas Highway 16 west of Savoy and forming a portion of the east boundary of the Ozark–St. Francis National Forest. The stream flows through a portion of the national forest and enters Benton County. Near Robinson the stream flows under U.S. Route 412 and turns to the west paralleling that route. It passes north of Pedro then under Route 412 again and turns to the southwest. It passes under Arkansas 16 again and Arkansas Highway 59 to the southeast of Siloam Springs. The stream leaves Arkansas at the southwest corner of Benton County and enters Lake Frances in Oklahoma.

It flows west into northeast Oklahoma, then southwest and south through the mountains of eastern Oklahoma, past Sparrowhawk and Tahlequah. South of Tahlequah, it passes through the reservoir Tenkiller Ferry Lake. It joins the Arkansas River downstream of Gore and upstream of Robert S. Kerr Reservoir, approximately 20 miles (32 km) southeast of Muskogee. Together with its tributary streams, it has a drainage area of 900 square miles (2,300 km^{2}). The town of Tahlequah on its banks was the western terminus of the Trail of Tears. The river is a major source of tourism in the area. In 1999, it was estimated to have brought in approximately 500,000 tourists and $9 million to the Oklahoma section of the river.

The upper section and its tributaries, Flint Creek and the Baron Fork, became a designated Scenic River under the Oklahoma Scenic Rivers Act in 1977. and home to many native species of bass with spring runs of white bass. It is a popular summertime destination for floaters. The lower section, below Tenkiller Dam, is a designated year-round trout stream, stocked with Rainbow and Brown Trout. The state record rainbow trout was caught in the cold tailwater of the dam.

== Tributaries ==
Major tributaries of the Illinois River include:

- Muddy Fork (L),
- Clear Creek (R),
- Osage Creek (R),
- Cincinnati Creek (L),
- Beaver Creek (R),
- Tate Parris Branch (L),
- Rock Branch (L),
- Dripping Springs Branch (R),
- Flint Creek (R),
- Blue Springs Branch (R),
- Luna Branch (L),
- Fall Branch (L),
- Falls Branch (R),
- Tahlequa Creek (R),
- Baron Fork (L),
- Park Hill Branch (R),

-at which point it flows into Tenkiller Ferry Lake. Below Tenkiller Ferry Lake are

- Red Bird Smith Creek (L)
- LaRue Branch (L),
- Deep Branch (L),
- Salt Branch (L)

== Nature preserve ==
The J. T. Nickel Family Nature and Wildlife Preserve is the largest nature preserve near the river. It is located near the east bank of the Illinois River near Tahlequah, Oklahoma. Elk were reintroduced into the preserve in 2005. This species had been missing from the Cookson Hills area for at least 150 years.

== Environmental issues ==
The river has been the source of a long-running controversy between the two states, with Oklahoma blaming Arkansas for pollution in the river, most notoriously phosphorus contamination by sewage and poultry farm runoff. In 1987, wastewater discharge by the city of Fayetteville, Arkansas was identified as the source of a heavy load of phosphorus. Oklahoma sued Arkansas to stop this discharge. The suit went to the U. S. Supreme Court in 1992, which ruled that the upstream state must enforce the water quality rules of the downstream state. In 2002, Oklahoma became the first state to use a numerical water quality standard for phosphorus. The standard for scenic rivers was set at 0.037 mg/L In December 2003, an agreement was reached between the two states, with Arkansas agreeing to reduce phosphorus output from its waste water treatment plants by 75% over the next ten years, although it does not address poultry-farm runoff.

In 1996, a report demonstrated that nutrient-fed algae was endangering Lake Tenkiller, which is located on the lower Illinois. The report stated that phosphorus content in the river should be reduced by 40 percent to prevent lake water quality from declining further and by 80 percent to return the quality to its original condition.

In the early 2000s, the Illinois River had high levels of pollution due largely to water runoff contaminated by chicken manure. In 2006, the state of Oklahoma began the process of suing a number of firms, including Tyson Foods Inc. because the chicken waste spread on fields near the river contains chemicals that were injurious to the ecosystem, hence jeopardizing the region's tourist industry. One lawyer involved in the prosecution said: "They're not fertilizing, they're dumping." By 2009, the river's condition was described as being visibly better, following the removal of nearly 290,000 tons of chicken waste from the catchment in the intervening four years.

The Oklahoma Water Resources Board reported in 2015, that phosphorus levels had been declining in the Illinois River and its tributaries on the Oklahoma side of the state line. On October 1, 2015, the U.S. Environmental Protection Agency (USEPA) issued for public comment the water quality model for the Illinois River.

The Oklahoma lawsuit named 11 companies, including: Cal-Maine Foods, Inc.; Tyson Poultry Inc.; Tyson Chicken Inc.; Cobb-Vantress Inc. (another subsidiary of Tyson); Cargill Turkey Production L.L.C.; George's Inc.; George's Farms Inc.; Peterson Farms Inc. and Simmons Foods Inc. A ruling in January 2023 gave the companies two months to explain how they will remedy the situation.

== In popular culture ==
The Illinois River is a significant location in the 1961 Wilson Rawls novel, Where the Red Fern Grows.

== See also ==
- List of rivers of Arkansas
- List of rivers of Oklahoma
