= Tenkiller Ferry Lake =

Oklahoma reservoir on the Illinois River

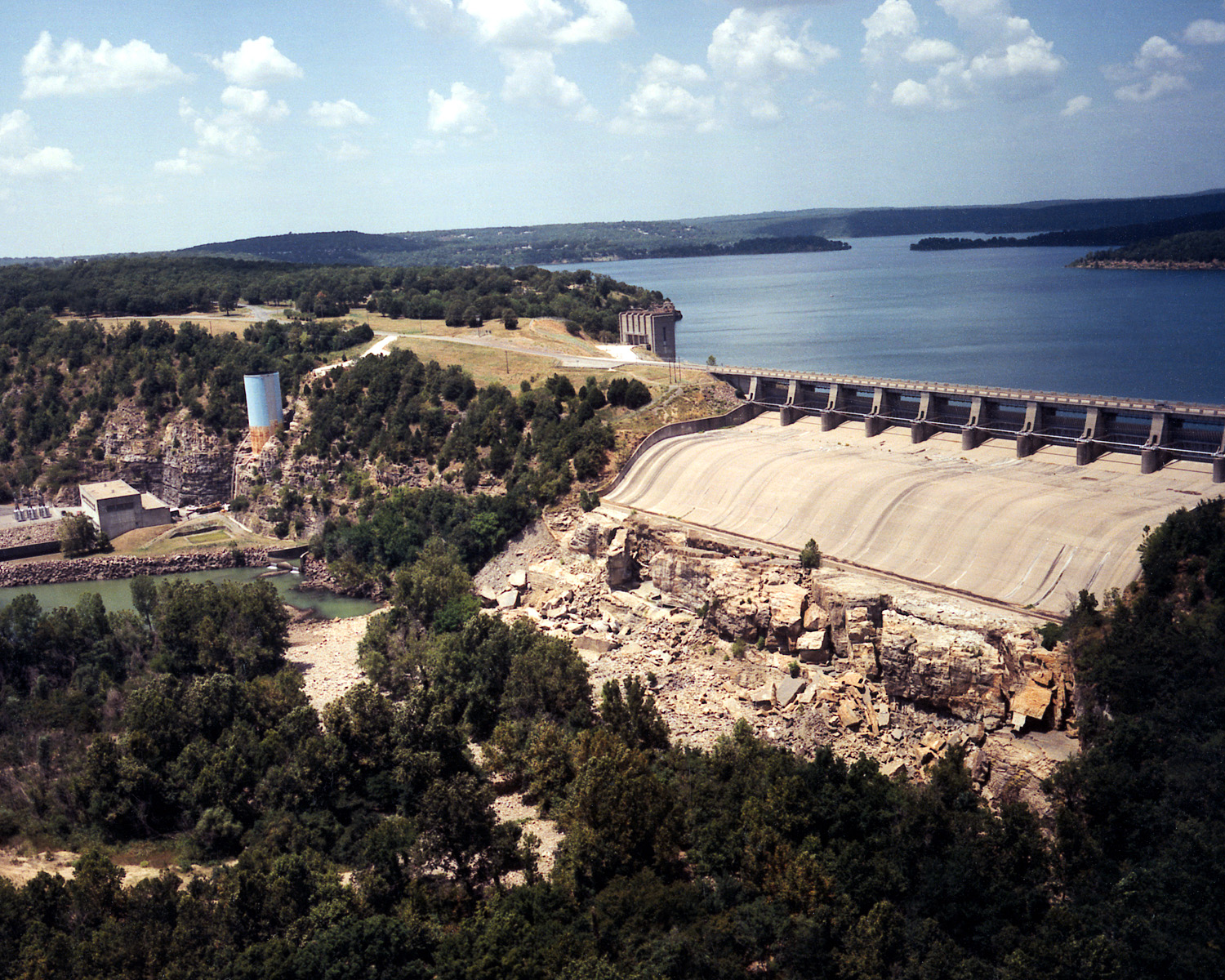
- Tenkiller Ferry Lake and Dam

- Location within Oklahoma Location within the United States
- Location: Cherokee / Sequoyah counties, Oklahoma, US
- Coordinates: 35°39′29″N 94°59′31″W
- Lake type: reservoir
- Primary inflows: Illinois River
- Primary outflows: Illinois River
- Catchment area: 1,610 sq mi (4,170 km^{2})
- Basin countries: United States
- Max. length: 35 mi (56,327 m)
- Surface area: 12,900 acres (5,200 ha)
- Max. depth: 132 ft (40 m)
- Water volume: 677,000 acre⋅ft (0.835 km^{3})
- Shore length^{1}: 130 mi (210 km)
- Surface elevation: 632 ft (193 m)
- Islands: Goat Island
- Settlements: Muskogee, Oklahoma
- ^{1} Shore length is not a well-defined measure.

Tenkiller Ferry Lake, or more simply, Lake Tenkiller, is a reservoir in eastern Oklahoma formed by the damming of the Illinois River. The earth-fill dam was constructed between 1947 and 1952 by the United States Army Corps of Engineers for purposes of flood control, hydroelectric power generation, water supply and recreation. It went into full operation in 1953. The lake and dam were named for the Tenkiller family, prominent Cherokees who owned the land and ferry that were bought for the project. The 6th largest lake in Oklahoma, based on water capacity, it is one of Oklahoma's 'Big Three' lakes, along with Lake Eufaula and Grand Lake o' the Cherokees. (Note: See List of lakes in Oklahoma.)

== Geography ==
Release of floodwater in 2015

The lake covers 12,900 acres (52 km^{2}) and has a shoreline of over 130 miles (210 km) in the Cookson Hills of the Ozark Mountains of Cherokee and Sequoyah counties, about seven miles (11 km) northeast of the town of Gore and 10 miles (16 km) from the intersection of I-40 and the Muskogee Turnpike.

The distance from major cities include: 150 miles (240 km) east of Oklahoma City, 50 miles (80 km) west of Fort Smith, Arkansas, 75 miles (121 km) southeast of Tulsa and 30 miles (48 km) from Muskogee.

One of the townships bordering this lake is Paradise Hill, at the far southwestern edge of the lake. It is known for its violent drop-offs, some going from a grown man's waist level to over his head. This is the cause of many deaths in the lake.

=== Electric power generation ===
The hydroelectric power station is remotely controlled from the control center at Fort Gibson Lake. Two generators, each rated for 17 megawatts, provide a total capacity of 34 megawatts (MWe). The facility can handle 40 MWe for a short period of time. However, the amount of power that can actually be generated depends heavily on the lake elevation at any given time.

=== Water supply ===
Originally, the amount of water delivered by the project was considered incidental, although the quality of water was much higher than that of the Arkansas River (the closest alternative source). Much of this water was expected to be used by the Kerr-McGee Nuclear Fuel Plant. That plant closed in 1975. The cities of Muskogee and Sallisaw are now major consumers.

== Recreation ==
Attractions near the lake include scuba diving, camping, hiking, fishing, golfing, water sports, scenic nature, fishing, and hunting. In addition there are eight miles (13 km) of trout fishing along the Illinois River. There are also ten marinas, fourteen parks, 24 boat launching ramps, five floating restaurants, and many islands including Goat Island which is famous for the goats that inhabit it. Scuba divers can even see the ruins of old communities that were flooded by the lake, such as the original town of Cookson. This lake is the venue of several fishing tournaments including the popular Bassmaster series championship.

Other than the goats, many other animals inhabit the area including Canada geese, white tail deer, ducks, monarch butterflies, warblers, otters, mink, beaver, bear, mountain lion, wild hogs, wild turkey and bald eagles.

Tenkiller State Park, Cherokee Landing State Park, and several Corps parks are among the parks bordering the lake.

== Wildlife Management Area ==
The Tenkiller Wildlife Management Area consists of 2,950 acres (11,900,000 m^{2}) on the southwest shoreline of the lake, a mixture of upland and riparian habitat. The upland portion is covered with oak and hickory. The riparian portion contains mostly willow, sycamore, hackberry, elm, ash, and birch.

== In popular culture ==
- The 1986 slasher film Terror at Tenkiller was set and shot around the lake
- Singer Tom Waits mentions the lake in the song 'Swordfishtrombone' off of his 1983 studio album Swordfishtrombones
