= List of rivers of Oklahoma =

This is a list of rivers in the state of Oklahoma, listed by drainage basin, alphabetically, and by size. In mean flow of water per second, the Arkansas is Oklahoma's largest river, followed by the Red River and the Neosho River.

== By drainage basin ==
This list is arranged by drainage basin, with respective tributaries indented under each larger stream's name.

=== Mississippi River ===
==== Red River ====
- Red River
  - Little River
      - Mountain Fork
      - Glover River
    - Kiamichi River
      - Buck Creek
    - Muddy Boggy Creek
      - Clear Boggy Creek
    - Blue River
    - Island Bayou
    - Washita River
      - Wildhorse Creek
      - Little Washita River
    - Beaver Creek
    - Cache Creek
      - East Cache Creek
      - West Cache Creek
        - Deep Red Creek
    - North Fork Red River
      - Sweetwater Creek
      - Elm Fork Red River
    - Salt Fork Red River
    - Prairie Dog Town Fork Red River

==== Arkansas River ====
- Mississippi River (AR)
  - Arkansas River
    - Poteau River
      - James Fork
      - Fourche Maline
    - Lee Creek
    - Sans Bois Creek
    - Little Sans Bois Creek
    - Sallisaw Creek
    - Canadian River
      - North Canadian River
        - Deep Fork River
        - Lightning Creek
        - Beaver River
          - Palo Duro Creek
          - Coldwater Creek
        - Wolf Creek
      - Little River
    - Illinois River
      - Caney Creek
      - Baron Fork
      - Flint Creek
    - Neosho River (Grand River)
      - Elk River
        - Buffalo Creek
      - Spring Creek
      - Spring River
    - Verdigris River
      - Bird Creek
        - North Bird Creek
        - Middle Bird Creek
        - South Bird Creek
        - Coal Creek
        - Dirty Butter Creek
        - Flat Rock Creek
        - Fry Creek
        - Haikey Creek
        - Hominy Creek
        - Joe Creek
        - Mingo Creek
      - Caney River
    - Cimarron River
      - Kingfisher Creek
        - Winter Camp Creek
      - North Carrizo Creek
        - East Carrizo Creek
        - West Carrizo Creek
      - South Carrizo Creek
      - Skeleton Creek
    - Black Bear Creek
    - Red Rock Creek
    - Salt Fork Arkansas River
      - Chikaskia River
      - Medicine Lodge River

== Alphabetically ==
- Arkansas River
- Baron Fork
- Beaver River
- Bird Creek
- Black Bear Creek
- Blue River
- Buck Creek
- Buffalo Creek
- Cache Creek
- Canadian River
- Caney River
- Chikaskia River
- Cimarron River
- Clear Boggy Creek
- Deep Fork River
- Elk River
- Elm Fork Red River
- Fourche Maline
- Glover River
- Grand River (the lower course of the Neosho River)
- Illinois River
- Island Bayou
- James Fork
- Kiamichi River
- Lightning Creek
- Little River (Canadian River tributary)
- Little River (Red River tributary)
- Medicine Lodge River
- Mountain Fork
- Muddy Boggy Creek
- Neosho River
- North Canadian River
- North Fork Red River
- Polecat Creek
- Poteau River
- Prairie Dog Town Fork Red River
- Red River
- Red Rock Creek
- Sallisaw Creek
- Salt Fork Arkansas River
- Salt Fork Red River
- Sans Bois Creek
- Spring Creek
- Spring River
- Sweetwater Creek
- Verdigris River
- Washita River
- Winter Camp Creek

== By size ==
Mean flow in cubic feet of water per second (cfs). One cubic foot equals .0283 cubic meters.

River	cubic feet per second flow	Location of monitoring station
Arkansas River	39,260	Near Arkansas state line
Red River	12,910	Near Arkansas state line
Neosho (Grand) River	8,890	Near Chouteau
Canadian River	6,523	Near Whitefield
Verdigris River	5,744	Below junction with Bird Creek
Little River (Red River tributary)	3,275	Near Arkansas state line
Poteau River	2,253	Near Panama
Cimarron River	2,236	Near Ripley
Spring River	2,209	Near Quapaw
Muddy Boggy Creek	2,002	Near Unger
South Canadian River	1,783	Near Calvin
Caney River	1,701	Near Ramona
Kiamichi River	1,615	Near Antlers
Salt Fork Arkansas River	1,565	Below Junction with Chikaskia
Illinois River	1,551	Near Gore
Mountain Fork River	1,430	Near Eagletown
Washita River	1,038	Near Tishomingo
Bird Creek	1,033	Near Catoosa
Deep Fork River	944	Near Beggs
North Canadian River	834	Near Wetumka
Elk River	821	Near Tiff City, Missouri
Chikaskia River	619	Near Blackwell
Lee Creek	546	Near Arkansas state line
North Fork Red River	531	Near Tipton
Clear Boggy Creek	498	Near Caney
Glover River	497	Near Glover
Cache Creek	391	Near junction with Red River
Little River (Canadian River)	360	Near Sasakwa
Baron Fork	329	Near Eldon
Blue River	320	Near Blue
Spavinaw Creek	307	Near Eucha
Black Bear Creek	221	Near Pawnee
Salt Fork Red River	239	Near Elmer
East Cache Creek	223	Near Walters
Mud Creek	186	Near Courtney
Deep Red Creek	168	Near Randlett
Black Fork Creek	156	Near Page
Medicine Lodge River	151	Near Kiowa, Kansas
Skeleton Creek	146	Near Lovell
Fourche Maline Creek	136	Near Red Oak
Caney Creek	131	Near Barber, Oklahoma
Little Lee Creek	121	Near Nicut, Oklahoma
Flint Creek	118	Near Kansas, Oklahoma

Source: "Annual Water Data Report" USGS, 2008. https://wdr.water.usgs.gov/wy2008/search.jsp; https://waterdata.usgs.gov/ok/nwis/current/?type=flow&group_key=NONE, accessed Dec 18,. 2010. Navigate to page 3 of reports of individual monitoring stations. Average Water flow statistics will vary slightly from year to year.

== See also ==
- List of lakes of Oklahoma
- List of rivers of the United States
