= 1898 Fort Smith tornadoes =

Severe weather event in the United States

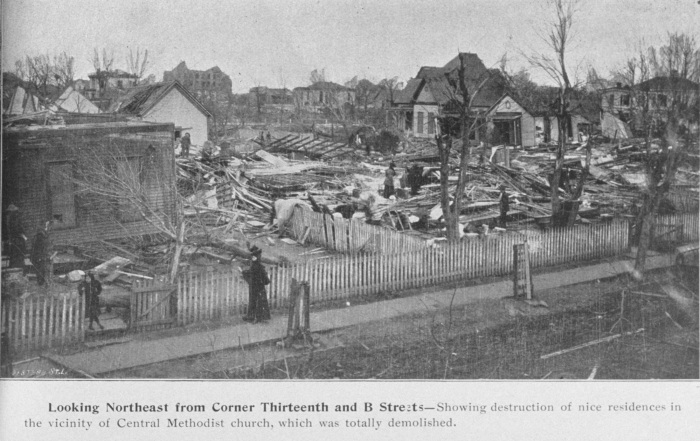
- Destroyed homes in Fort Smith

Tornado outbreak
- Tornadoes: ≥5
- Max. rating: F4 tornado
- Duration: January 11, 1898

Overall effects
- Fatalities: 56
- Injuries: 118
- Damage: ≥$453,000 (≥$17,530,000 in 2025 USD) (Note: All losses are in 1898 USD unless otherwise noted.)
- Areas affected: Arkansas, Missouri, and Indian Territory (now Oklahoma)
- Part of the tornadoes and tornado outbreaks of 1898

On January 11, 1898, a series of tornadoes affected the U.S. states of Arkansas and Missouri, as well as the Indian Territory, presently Oklahoma. At least five in all, these included the Fort Smith tornado, which struck the city of Fort Smith, Arkansas. Retroactively rated a violent (F4) tornado on the modern-day Fujita scale, (Note: The Fujita scale was devised under the aegis of scientist T. Theodore Fujita in the early 1970s. Prior to the advent of the scale in 1971, tornadoes in the United States were officially unrated. Tornado ratings were retroactively applied to events prior to the formal adoption of the F-scale by the National Weather Service. While the Fujita scale has been superseded by the Enhanced Fujita scale in the U.S. since February 1, 2007, Canada used the old scale until April 1, 2013; nations elsewhere, like the United Kingdom, apply other classifications such as the TORRO scale.) it was part of a tornado family that formed 60 mi (97 km) to the southwest, and struck the city around midnight, killing 55 people and injuring 113. The tornado nearly destroyed the newly constructed Fort Smith High School that had opened in fall 1897. Other tornadoes were reported that night in Arkansas and Missouri. The Fort Smith tornado is tied with one that struck Warren in 1949, also rated F4, for the deadliest tornado to strike Arkansas.

== Confirmed tornadoes ==
Confirmed tornadoes by Fujita rating
FU	F0	F1	F2	F3	F4	F5	Total
1	?	?	3	0	1	0	≥5

Prior to 1990, there is a likely undercount of tornadoes, particularly F0–1, with reports of weaker tornadoes becoming more common as population increased. A sharp increase in the annual average F0–1 count by approximately 200 tornadoes was noted upon the implementation of NEXRAD Doppler weather radar in 1990–1991. (Note: Historically, the number of tornadoes globally and in the United States was and is likely underrepresented: research by Grazulis on annual tornado activity suggests that, as of 2001, only 53% of yearly U.S. tornadoes were officially recorded. Documentation of tornadoes outside the United States was historically less exhaustive, owing to the lack of monitors in many nations and, in some cases, to internal political controls on public information. Most countries only recorded tornadoes that produced severe damage or loss of life. Significant low biases in U.S. tornado counts likely occurred through the early 1990s, when advanced NEXRAD was first installed and the National Weather Service began comprehensively verifying tornado occurrences.) 1974 marked the first year where significant tornado (F2+) counts became homogenous with contemporary values, attributed to the consistent implementation of Fujita scale assessments.

List of confirmed tornadoes – Tuesday, January 11, 1898 (Note: All dates are based on the local time zone where the tornado touched down; however, all times are in Coordinated Universal Time and dates are split at midnight CST/CDT for consistency.)
F#	Location	County / Parish	State	Time (UTC)	Path length	Width (Note: The listed width values are primarily the average/mean width of the tornadoes, with those having known maximum widths denoted by ♯. From 1952 to 1994, reports largely list mean width whereas contemporary years list maximum width. Values provided by Grazulis are the average width, with estimates being rounded down (i.e. 0.5 mi (0.80 km) is rounded down from 880 yards to 800 yards).)	Damage
F2	W of Fayetteville	Washington	Arkansas	04:00–?	Unknown	Unknown	Unknown
F2	A two-story home was wrecked, injuring a person.						
F2	Bradleyville	Taney	Missouri	05:00–?	5 mi (8.0 km)	300 yd (270 m)	$3,000
F2	1 death – Homes were wrecked, with five injuries. One of the injured died weeks later.						
F4	Western Fort Smith to E of Van Buren	Sebastian, Crawford	Arkansas	05:15–?	10 mi (16 km)	200 yd (180 m)	$450,000
F4	55 deaths – See section on this tornado – 113 people were injured.						
F2	S of Alma to NW of Ozark	Crawford, Franklin	Arkansas	05:30–?	15 mi (24 km)	200 yd (180 m)	Unknown
F2	Four homes lost roofs, and several barns were wrecked. Outbuildings were damaged as well.						
FU	Near Sans Bois	Choctaw Nation	Indian Territory	Unknown	Unknown	Unknown	Unknown
FU	This, the first member of the Fort Smith family, formed over the Sans Bois Mountains.						

=== Fort Smith, Arkansas ===
Fort Smith, Arkansas
Meteorological history
- Formed: January 11, 1898, 11:15 p.m. CST (UTC−06:00)

F4 tornado
- on the Fujita scale

Overall effects
- Fatalities: 55
- Injuries: 113
- Damage: $450,000 ($17,420,000 in 2025 USD)

Part of a long-lived tornado family, this event may have first damaged trees near the Arkansas River in Oklahoma, beginning near Cache Creek. Intermittent damage to vegetation continued past the Poteau River. The tornado was confirmable at the Fort Smith National Cemetery, where it leveled a 1-mile-long (1.6 km), 5-foot-high (1.5 m) stretch of masonry, downed trees, and severely damaged a lodge. Farther on, it extensively damaged a schoolhouse. The tornado then tracked into the business district of Fort Smith, causing scores of fatalities. "Dozens" of businesses and residences were flattened, some homesites being left bare. At city hall, 40 large trees, up to 50 ft (15 m) tall, were felled, and an iron flagstaff, embedded in granite and fastened by 1-inch-thick (25 mm) guy wires, was pulled out, the wires being snapped. A 500-foot-long (150 m) brick wall, 1 ft (0.30 m) thick and 4 1/2 ft (1.4 m) tall, was leveled. A three-story brick building was moved off its foundation, and 30 homes in town, mostly frame, were destroyed, along with a quartet of churches. 130 other homes of similar composition were damaged. An iron beam, driven into a brick wall, could not be dislodged, clothing was found 30 mi (48 km) away, and signage from Fort Smith was carried 22 mi (35 km). Initial reports indicated that 33 people died instantly, while 18 later succumbed of injury. Of the 113 injuries, 44 were severe, 73 minor. Final tabulations totaled 55 dead and 113 injured, including three dead near Van Buren, where rural farmsteads were wrecked.

== Sources ==
- Agee, Ernest M.; Childs, Samuel (June 1, 2014). "Adjustments in Tornado Counts, F-Scale Intensity, and Path Width for Assessing Significant Tornado Destruction". Journal of Applied Meteorology and Climatology. 53 (6). American Meteorological Society: 1494–1505. Bibcode:2014JApMC..53.1494A. doi:10.1175/JAMC-D-13-0235.1.
- Brooks, Harold E. (April 2004). "On the Relationship of Tornado Path Length and Width to Intensity". Weather and Forecasting. 19 (2): 310–19. Bibcode:2004WtFor..19..310B. doi:10.1175/1520-0434(2004)019<0310:OTROTP>2.0.CO;2.
- Cook, A. R.; Schaefer, J. T. (August 2008). "The Relation of El Niño–Southern Oscillation (ENSO) to Winter Tornado Outbreaks". Monthly Weather Review. 136 (8): 3121–3137. Bibcode:2008MWRv..136.3121C. doi:10.1175/2007MWR2171.1.
- Douglass, J. K. P. (January 1898). Written at Alma, Arkansas. Clarke, F. H. (ed.). "The tornado near Alma, Crawford County, January 11, 1898". Arkansas section. Climatological Data. 3 (1). Little Rock, Arkansas: 7 – via National Centers for Environmental Information.
- Edwards, Roger; LaDue, James G.; Ferree, John T.; Scharfenberg, Kevin; Maier, Chris; Coulbourne, William L. (May 1, 2013). "Tornado Intensity Estimation: Past, Present, and Future". Bulletin of the American Meteorological Society. 94 (5). American Meteorological Society: 641–653. Bibcode:2013BAMS...94..641E. doi:10.1175/BAMS-D-11-00006.1.
- Henry, A. J. (January 1898). "The weather of the month". Monthly Weather Review. 26 (1). Washington, D.C.: 5–9. doi:10.1175/1520-0493(1898)26[5:TWOTM]2.0.CO;2 – via American Meteorological Society.
- Grazulis, Thomas P. (May 1984). Violent Tornado Climatography, 1880–1982. OSTI (Technical report). NUREG. Washington, D.C.: Nuclear Regulatory Commission. OSTI 7099491. CR-3670.
  - — (November 1990). Significant Tornadoes 1880–1989. Vol. 2. St. Johnsbury, Vermont: The Tornado Project of Environmental Films. ISBN 1-879362-02-3.
  - — (July 1993). Significant Tornadoes 1680-1991. A Chronology and Analysis of Events. St. Johnsbury, VT: The Tornado Project of Environmental Films. ISBN 1-879362-03-1.
  - — (2001a). The Tornado: Nature's Ultimate Windstorm. Norman: University of Oklahoma Press. ISBN 978-0-8061-3538-0.
  - — (2001b). F5-F6 Tornadoes. St. Johnsbury, Vermont: The Tornado Project of Environmental Films.
- O'Donnell, J. J. (January 1898) [February 21, 1898]. Written at Fort Smith, Arkansas. Clarke, F. H. (ed.). "Report of the Ft. Smith tornado Jan. 11–12, 1898". Arkansas section. Climatological Data. 3 (1). Little Rock, Arkansas: 5–8 – via National Centers for Environmental Information.
  - — (January 1898) [February 21, 1898]. Written at Fort Smith, Arkansas. "The tornado of January 12, at Fort Smith, Ark". Monthly Weather Review. 26 (1). Washington, D.C.: 18–9. doi:10.1175/1520-0493(1898)26[18:TTOJAF]2.0.CO;2.
- Photographic views of the cyclone at Fort Smith, Arkansas, Tuesday night, January 11, 1898. Fort Smith, Arkansas: Thrash-Lick Printing Company. January 1898. OL 23367074M – via Internet Archive.
