= Wister School =

Wister School may refer to:

- Mary Channing Wister School in Philadelphia
- John Wister School, in the School District of Philadelphia (now run by Mastery Charter Schools)
- Wister Public Schools in Oklahoma
