= James Fork =

American river

Coordinates: 35°09′48″N 94°38′43″W

The James Fork is a 50.3-mile-long (81.0 km) river in the U.S. states of Arkansas and Oklahoma, forming on the north slope of Poteau Mountain in the Ouachita National Forest in Arkansas and flowing north and west into the Poteau River near Panama, Oklahoma. Via the Poteau and Arkansas rivers, the James Fork is part of the Mississippi River watershed.

The settlements of Hartford, Midland, and Hackett, Arkansas are on or near the river. Portions of the Mansfield Branch of the St. Louis-San Francisco Railway and the main line of the Midland Valley Railroad were built alongside the river.
