= Poteau =

Poteau may refer to:

== Places ==
- Poteau, Belgium, between the municipalities of St. Vith and Vielsalm
- Poteau, Oklahoma, United States
- Poteau River, a river in Oklahoma and Arkansas

== Other uses ==
- A type of pillory (French for "pole")
- In Quebec, Canada, a paper candidate
