= Lightning Creek =

Lightning Creek may refer to:

- Lightning Creek (British Columbia)
- Lightning Creek (Oklahoma)
- Lightning Creek (South Dakota)
- Lightning Creek (Wyoming)
