= Medicine Lodge =

Medicine Lodge may refer to:

- Medicine Lodge, Alberta, Canada
- Medicine Lodge, Kansas, United States
- Medicine lodge (sauna), a ceremonial sauna

== See also ==
- Medicine Lodge River, a tributary of the Salt Fork of the Arkansas River in Kansas and Oklahoma, United States
- Medicine Lodge Township, a township in Barber County, Kansas, United States
- Medicine Lodge Treaty, the overall name for three treaties signed between the Federal government of the United States and southern Plains Indian tribes in October 1867
