= Skullyville County, Choctaw Nation =

Skullyville County was a political subdivision of the Choctaw Nation of Indian Territory, prior to Oklahoma being admitted as a state. The county formed part of the Nation's Moshulatubbee District, or First District, one of three administrative super-regions.

== History ==
The county was also called Iskvlli Kaunti, from the Choctaw word iskvlli, which means a 'small piece of money or coin.' (The apparent lower-case letter "v" is the Greek letter upsilon, which makes a short "u" sound, for a pronunciation akin to "iskulli.") Skullyville County was home, from 1832, of the United States agency for the Choctaws in the Indian Territory. The agency was located about fifteen miles west of Fort Smith. The village which grew up around the agency came to be known as Skullyville, that word being a corruption of iskulli with the suffix, -ville, suggesting a literal translation of money town. The agency itself, however, was called Iskvlli ai Ilhpita, or 'the place where money is donated or presented.'

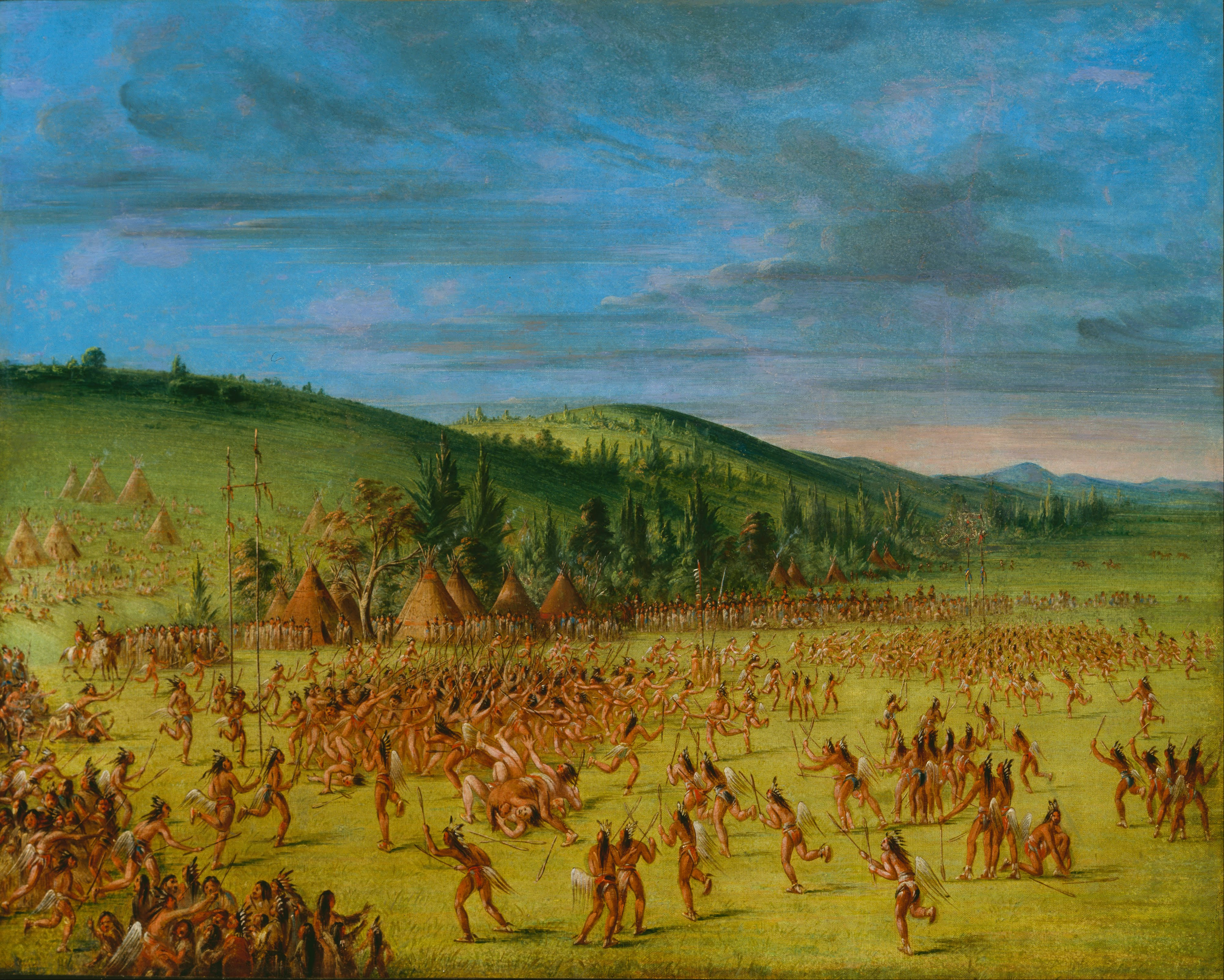
Artist George Catlin visited Skullyville in 1834 and painted this picture of Choctaw Indians playing stickball.

Skullyville town was settled in about 1832, after the area served as a landing site for Choctaw Indians who came to the new Indian Territory via the "Trail of Tears" by steamboat. The steamboats used a landing on the south side of the Arkansas River featuring a large rock shelf. Later, the town served as county seat. It also served as one-time capital of the Choctaw Nation.

Fort Coffee was built and garrisoned by the U.S. Army in 1834 to secure the region from incursions by the "wild" Wichita and Comanche Indians to the west. Skullyville was visited the same year by George Catlin, an American painter, author, and traveler, who specialized in portraits of Native Americans in the old West. Catlin painted Choctaw Indians playing stickball at Skullyville, and provides the only surviving descriptions of the Ball Play Dance and Eagle Dance. Catlin depicts the stickball game in a valley framed by the rolling hills which are iconic to the Skullyville region.

Skullyville County was one of the original 19 counties created by the General Council of the Choctaw Nation in 1850. The county's boundaries were established and designated according to easily recognizable natural landmarks, as were the boundaries of all Choctaw Nation counties. As example, the Arkansas River formed the county's northern border. The Arkansas state line formed the eastern border. The western border was a line drawn from the mouth of Cashier Creek on the Arkansas River southward to its source. From there it followed a straight line to an area known as the Narrows, near Red Oak. The county's southern border threaded its way through well-defined valleys along Cavanal Mountain and adjacent ridges, following Cedar Creek, Fourche Maline, and the Poteau River.

The county served as an election district for members of the National Council, and as a unit of local administration. Constitutional officers, all of whom served for two-year terms and were elected by the voters, included the county judge, sheriff, and a ranger. The judge's duties included oversight of overall county administration. The sheriff collected taxes, monitored unlawful intrusion by intruders (usually white Americans from the United States), and conducted the census. The county ranger advertised and sold strayed livestock.

== Statehood ==
As Oklahoma's statehood approached, its leading citizens, who were gathered for the Oklahoma Constitutional Convention, realized in laying out the future state's counties that, while logically designed, the Choctaw Nation's counties could not exist as economically viable political subdivisions. In most the county seat existed generally for holding county court and not as a population center. While this was not generally true of Skullyville County, with its bustling commercial towns along several railroad lines, and particularly Poteau, it would have to be dismantled to accommodate changes required by the region at large.

This conundrum was also recognized by the framers of the proposed State of Sequoyah, who met in 1905 to propose statehood for the Indian Territory. The Sequoyah Constitutional Convention also proposed a county structure that abolished the Choctaw counties. Skullyville County was divided principally into the proposed Thomas County and Rutherford County. Stigler and Bokoshe would have been Thomas County's principal towns. The prosperous railroad junctions of Poteau, Spiro, and Wister would have anchored Rutherford County.

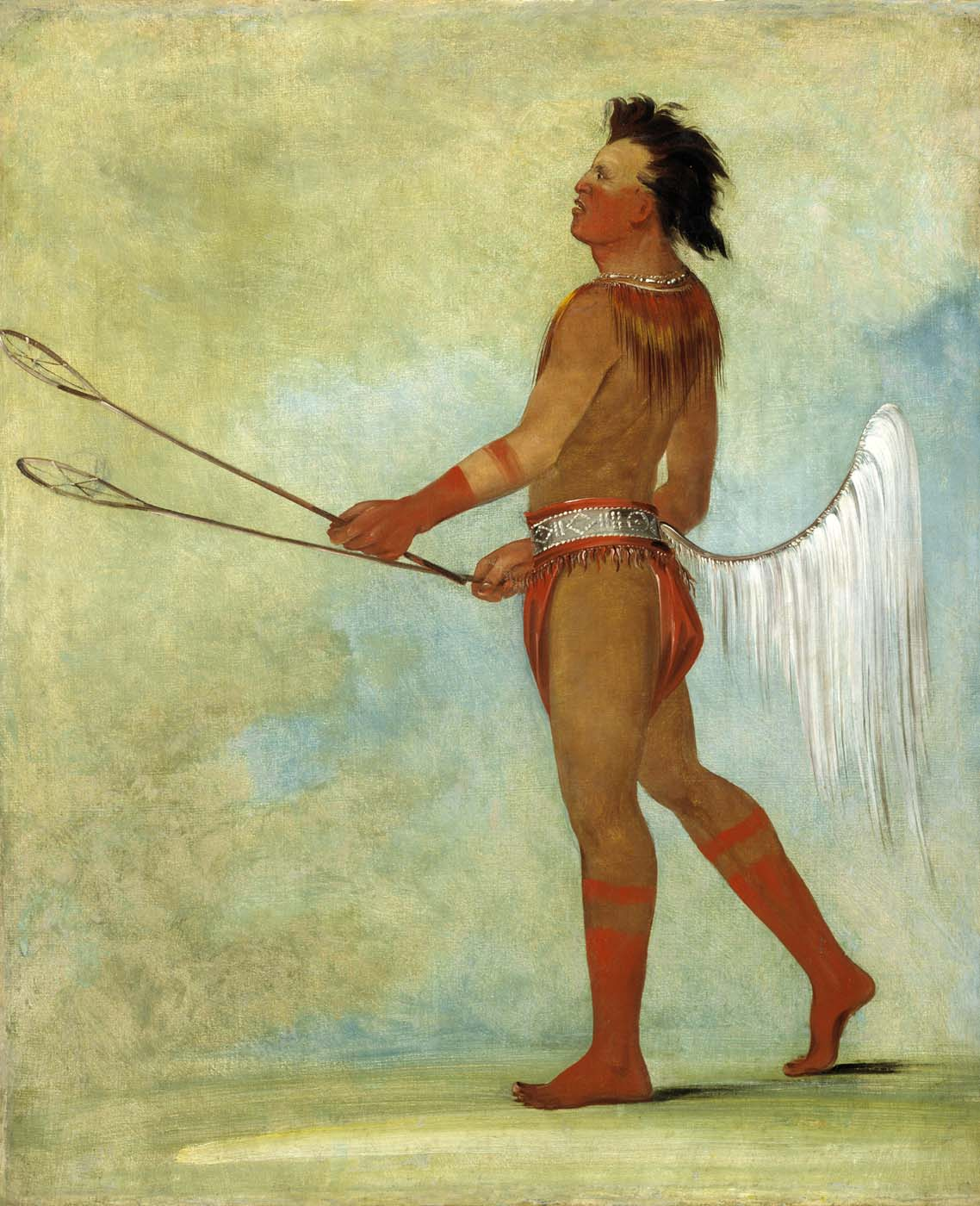
Tul-lock-chísh-ko, or "Drinks the Juice of the Stone," dressed for the sport of stickball. Painting by George Catlin, Skullyville, 1834.

Almost none of this proposition was borrowed two years later by Oklahoma's framers, who adopted a very different county structure for the region. The territory formerly comprising Skullyville County, Choctaw Nation now falls primarily within Le Flore, Haskell, and Latimer counties. Skullyville County ceased to exist upon Oklahoma's statehood on 16 November 1907.
