= Winter Camp Creek =

Stream in Oklahoma, U.S.

Coordinates: 35.8569873°N 97.9700545°W

Winter Camp Creek is a stream in Kingfisher and Canadian counties, Oklahoma, United States, which feeds into Kingfisher Creek. The creek flows approximately 24 miles through a watershed of about 74,000 acres before joining Kingfisher Creek near the town of Kingfisher.

== History ==
Winter Camp Creek was named for a Cheyenne and Arapaho winter settlement that stood near its banks during the 19th century. The site was historically significant as part of the seasonal migration patterns of Plains tribes, who established winter camps along sheltered waterways for access to game and water resources.

The creek was originally called Dead Indian Creek, a name derived from a Cheyenne burial site discovered by early settlers near the stream. Cottonwood groves along the banks provided a traditional burial location for the tribe. The name was officially changed to Winter Camp Creek in 2002 after concerns that the former name was offensive.

== Geography ==
The headwaters of Winter Camp Creek arise about 5 miles north of Calumet in Canadian County and flow northeast through agricultural land before entering Kingfisher County. It joins Kingfisher Creek approximately 2 miles west of the city of Kingfisher. The surrounding terrain is part of the Red Bed Plains region, characterized by rolling hills and prairie grasslands.

== Environmental issues ==
Winter Camp Creek was listed as impaired for turbidity under the Clean Water Act section 303(d) in 2006 due to sediment runoff from cropland and grazing areas. Conservation practices implemented through the Natural Resources Conservation Service and the Oklahoma Conservation Commission improved water quality, and the creek was removed from the impaired waters list in 2010. Portions of the creek have been channelized and impounded for livestock watering and, more recently, for oil and gas extraction.

== Cultural significance ==
The creek corridor reflects the history of the Cheyenne and Arapaho Tribes in central Oklahoma and their adaptation to reservation life after the Indian Removal era. Archaeological evidence and oral histories indicate that winter camps along the creek were used for hunting, shelter, and cultural gatherings.

== See also ==
- List of rivers of Oklahoma
- Cheyenne and Arapaho Tribes
- Kingfisher Creek
- Indian Territory
