= Canadian River =

River in the western United States

Canadian
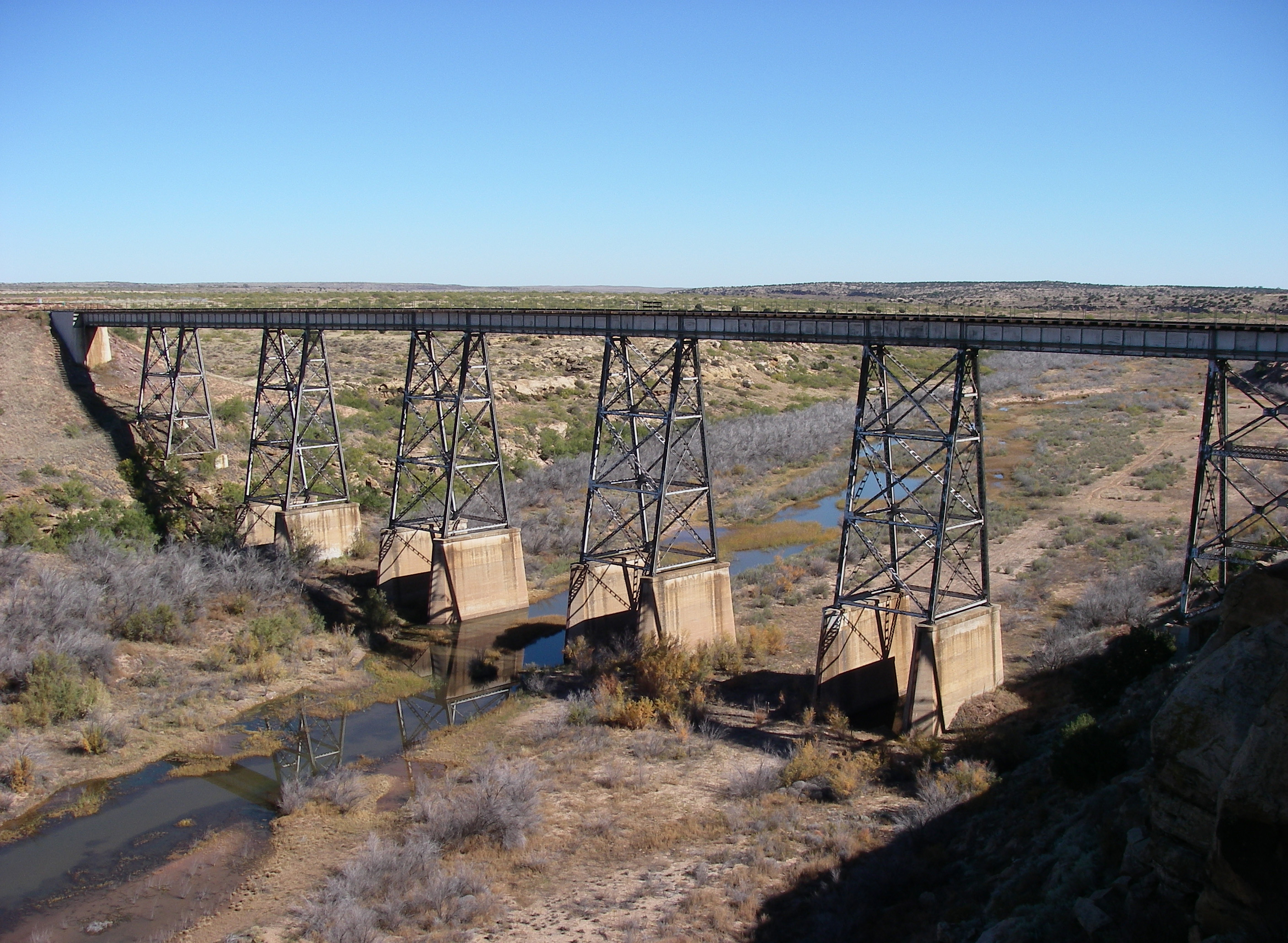
- Canadian River south of Logan, New Mexico

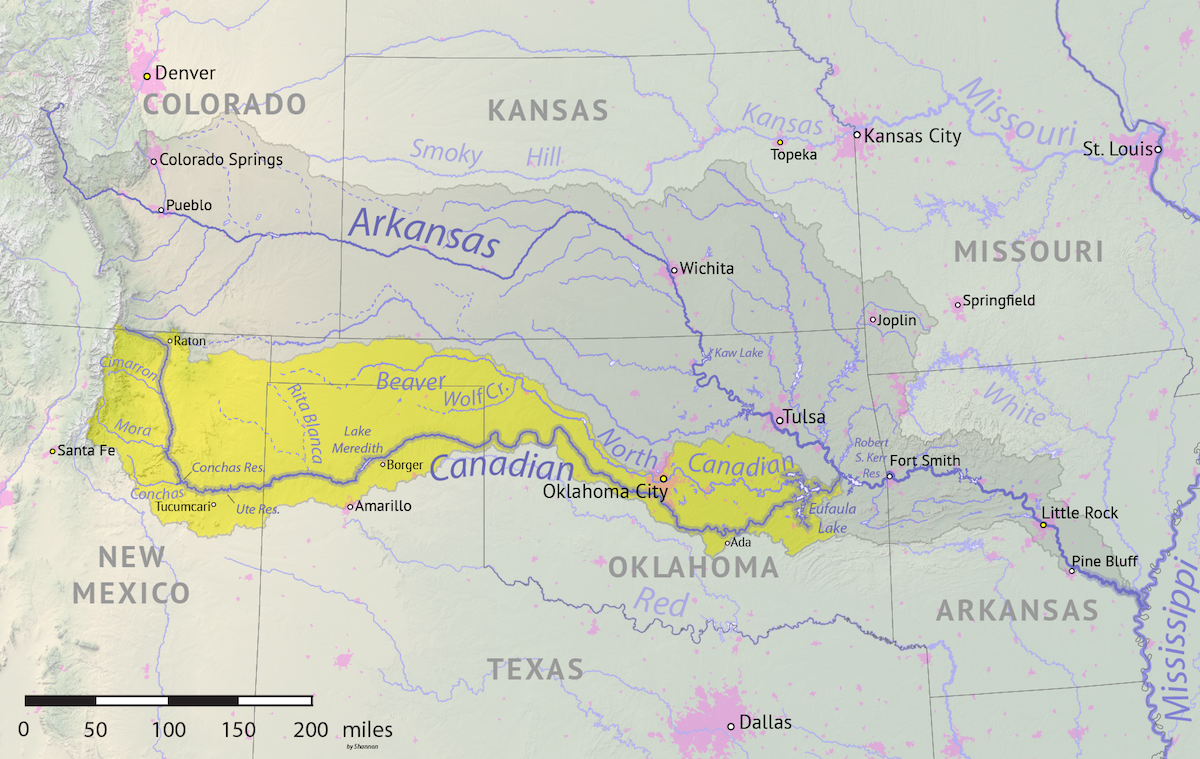
- Canadian River watershed (yellow) within the Arkansas River watershed

Location
- Country: United States
- State: Oklahoma, Colorado, New Mexico, Texas

Physical characteristics
- Source: Rocky Mountains
  - location: Las Animas County, Colorado
  - coordinates: 37°01′11″N 105°04′33″W
  - elevation: 2,900 m (9,500 ft)
- Mouth: Arkansas River (1st place); North Canadian River (2nd place)
  - location: Haskell County, Oklahoma (1st place) near Eufaula, Oklahoma (2nd place)
  - coordinates: 35°27′12″N 95°01′58″W (1st place); 35°16′20″N 95°32′03″W (2nd place)
  - elevation: 142 m (466 ft)
- Length: 1,026 mi (1,651 km)
- Basin size: 47,576 sq mi (123,220 km^{2})
- Discharge
  - location: Whitefield, Oklahoma
  - average: 6,434 cu ft/s (182.2 m^{3}/s)
  - minimum: 357 cu ft/s (10.1 m^{3}/s)
  - maximum: 281,000 cu ft/s (8,000 m^{3}/s)

The Canadian River is the longest tributary of the Arkansas River. Entirely within the United States, it is about 1,026 miles (1,651 km) long, starting in Colorado and traveling through New Mexico, the Texas Panhandle, and Oklahoma. The drainage area is about 47,700 square miles (124,000 km^{2}).

The Canadian is sometimes referred to as the South Canadian River to differentiate it from its tributary the North Canadian River.

== Etymology ==
On John C. Fremont's route map of 1845, the river's name is listed as "Goo-al-pah or Canadian River" from the Comanche and Kiowa name for the river (Kiowa gúlvàu, [ɡúᵈl.pʼɔː] red river). In 1929, Muriel H. Wright wrote that the Canadian River was named about 1820 by French traders who noted another group of traders from Canada (Canadiens) had camped on the river near its confluence with the Arkansas River.

According to the Encyclopedia of Oklahoma History and Culture, Spanish explorers in the 17th and 18th centuries called it the Rio Buenaventura and the Magdalena. The upper part was called Rio Colorado by the Spanish.

A more recent explanation comes from William Bright, who wrote that the name is "probably derived from Río Canadiano", a Spanish spelling of the Caddo word káyántinu, which was the Caddo people's name for the nearby Red River.

The name could be of Spanish origin from the word cañada (meaning "glen"), as the Canadian River formed a steep canyon in northern New Mexico and a somewhat broad canyon in Texas. A few historical records document that explanation. Edward Hale, writing in 1929, considered the French origin of the name most probable. In fact, the river was regularly used by Canadian fur traders (such as Louis Feuilli and Jean Chapuis, as well as the Mallet brothers) trying to establish contact with Santa Fe as early as 1752.

== History ==
The first European to explore the Canadian River was Juan de Oñate, the Spanish governor of New Mexico, who followed the river from its origin to the western plains of what is now Oklahoma in 1601. Spanish traders and hunters were soon actively working in this area. French voyageurs were active along the lower Canadian. Bénard de la Harpe explored between the mouth of the river and the Kiamichi Mountains in 1715. Pierre and Paul Mallet followed the entire length of the river in 1740, as did another expedition led by Fabry de la Bruyère in 1741. (Note: André Fabry de la Bruyère was a French government official of New Orleans, who led the second expedition up the Canadian River.) The Louisiana Purchase in 1803 resulted in all of the land east of the New Mexico border being acquired by the United States.

In 1818, the Quapaw tribe ceded all its land north of the Canadian to the United States, thus making this river the effective southern boundary of the new nation. In 1825, the Osage ceded their claims to land along the river. The Canadian was designated as the boundary between the Creek-Seminole lands on the north side and the Choctaw (and later the Chickasaw) on the south side. Major Stephen H. Long led an expedition up the Canadian River in 1821. He proclaimed the land along the river as the Great American Desert. Despite this assessment, trading posts were established along the river, starting with Edwards' Post at the mouth of Little River. Camp Holmes was established by Colonel Henry Dodge's Dragoons in 1834. Captain Nathan Boone led a dragoon troop up the river to the 100th meridian, which was then the western border of the United States. See also: Stephen H. Long's Expedition of 1820

The Treaty of Doak's Stand in 1820, made the Canadian River the northern boundary of the Choctaw Nation. Early immigrants to California followed the south bank of the Canadian to Santa Fe. In 1845, the river was explored by Lieutenants James William Abert and William G. Peck of the U.S. Army Corps of Topographical Engineers. Their journey was chronicled in the Journal of Lieutenant J.W. Abert from Bent's Fort to St. Louis, first published in 1846.

Randolph B. Marcy commanded a military expedition to lay out a trail along the Canadian River in 1849. The trail, which was thereafter called the California Road, followed the south side of the river and was soon followed by large numbers of emigrants to California via Santa Fe, especially after the 1849 discovery of gold in California. Travel along the road was sharply curtailed during the American Civil War, as Union and Confederate forces fought for control of Indian Territory.

Lieutenant Amiel Weeks Whipple led an expedition in 1853 to find a railroad route across Indian Territory. It covered some of the same ground as that explored by Abert and Marcy. Whipple's group provided extensive reports about the region's flora and fauna. The group's cost estimates, though, discouraged proponents from building a railroad along the proposed route. Later, the cumulative reports of Abert, Marcy, and Whipple changed public opinion about the "Great American Desert" and encouraged interest in developing the region.

In 1890, when Oklahoma Territory was proclaimed, the river formed part of the boundary between Oklahoma Territory and Indian Territory. This boundary was ended when the State of Oklahoma was created in 1907.

== Course ==
The river rises on the east side of the Sangre de Cristo Mountains, around 9,600 ft (2,900 m) above sea level, in remote southwestern Las Animas County, Colorado, roughly 1.5 mi (2.4 km) north of the New Mexico border. (Note: The Encyclopedia of Oklahoma History and Culture gives the coordinates of the river's origin as approximately 37˚01´ N, 105˚03´ W.) An upper tributary of the Vermejo River heads around 12,000 feet (3,700 m) in elevation in the Culebra Range and has a confluence with the Canadian south of Maxwell, New Mexico. Overall, the meandering course is 1,026 miles (1,651 km) from its origin to its confluence with the Arkansas River. The main tributaries are the North Canadian, Little, and Deep Fork Rivers.

After rising in Colorado, the Canadian flows east-southeast across the New Mexico border, then south, passing west of Raton, New Mexico. It forms a deep canyon south of Springer, New Mexico. The Sabinoso Wilderness area is located in side canyons near the river. At its first dam at Conchas Lake, the river turns eastward. It is also dammed at Logan, New Mexico, where it forms Ute Lake. From there it crosses the Texas Panhandle, dammed at Sanford, Texas, where it forms Lake Meredith. The canyon the river carves through eastern New Mexico and the Texas Panhandle is the northern border of the Llano Estacado, separating it from the rest of the Great Plains. From Texas, the Canadian continues eastward into Oklahoma, passing just south of Oklahoma City. At Eufaula, Oklahoma, it flows into Eufaula Lake, the largest on this river. About 20 miles (32 km) downstream, it joins the Arkansas River at Robert S. Kerr Reservoir, around 40 miles (64 km) west of the Arkansas border.

For most of its length, the Canadian is a slow-moving waterway bounded by red mud flats and quicksand. When sufficient rain has fallen, the river can carry substantial amounts of water. The river is now under the control of the Canadian River Commission.

== Images ==
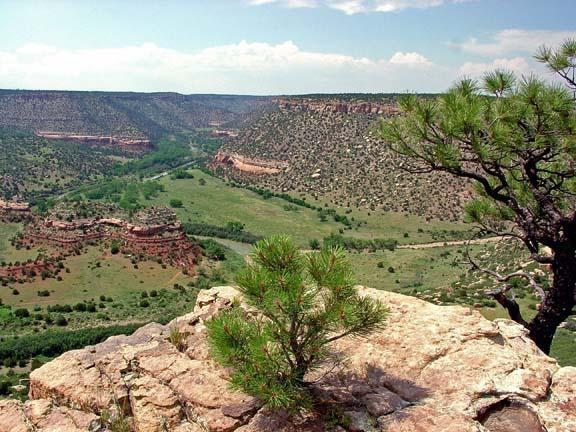
Canadian River Canyon in Kiowa National Grassland, Eastern New Mexico

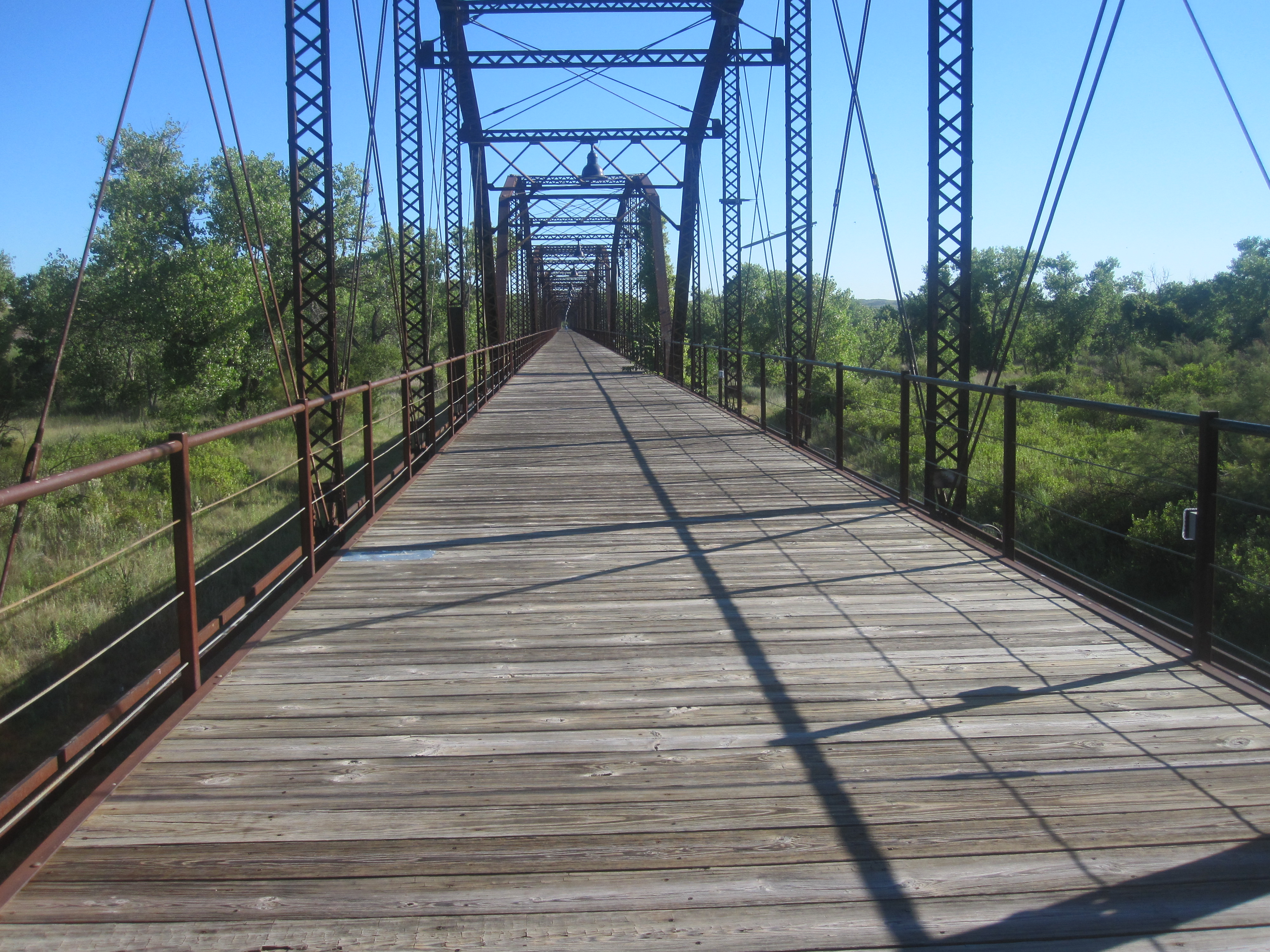
Wooden bridge over the Canadian River in Hemphill County, Texas

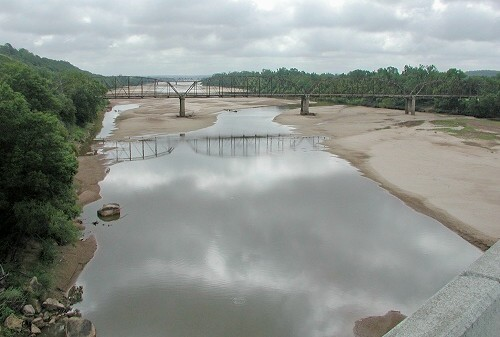
Canadian River at Calvin, Oklahoma

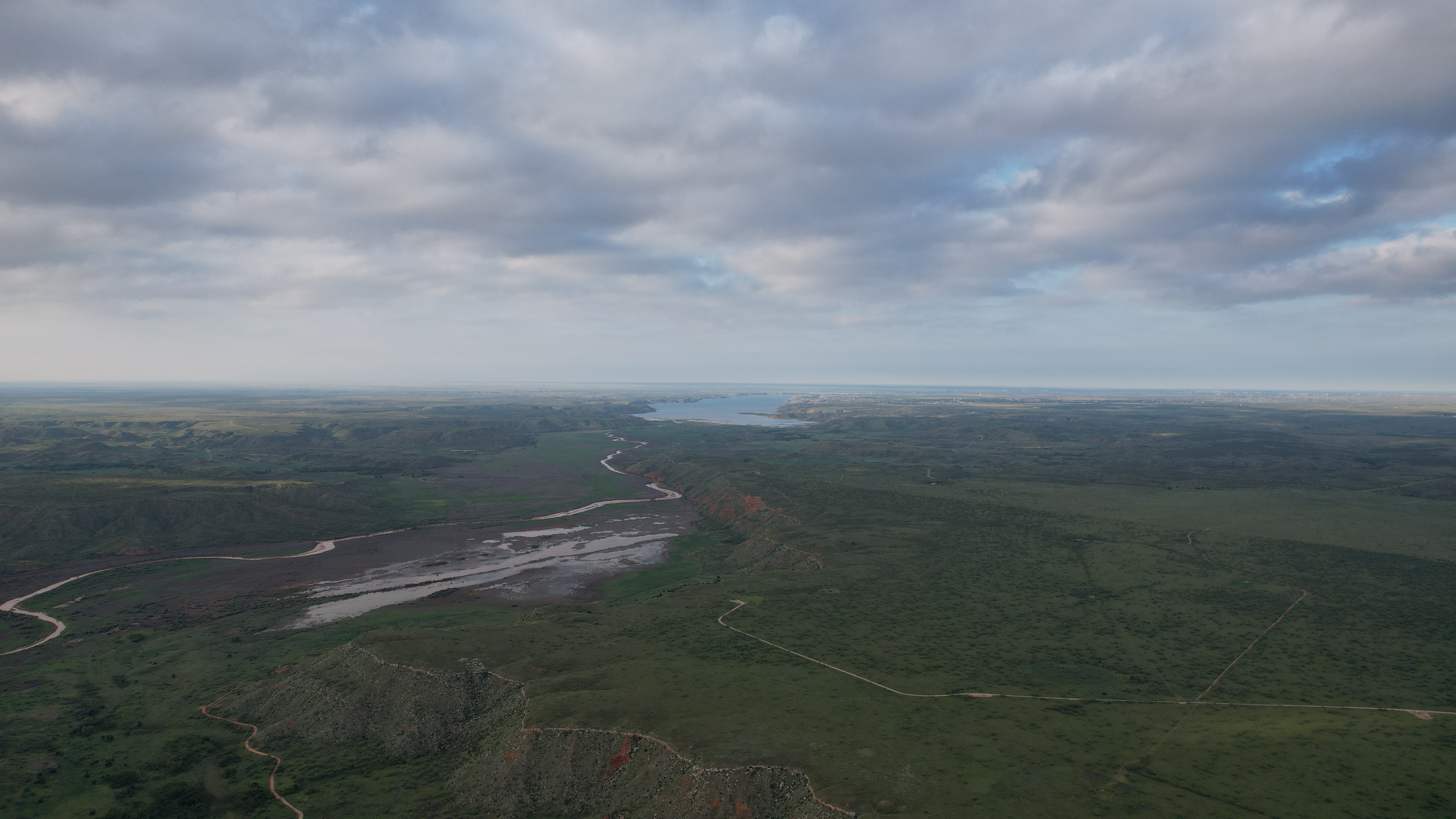
Lake Meredith in the background, facing Northeast. Canadian River on left side.

== See also ==
- List of Colorado rivers
- List of longest rivers of the United States (by main stem)
- List of New Mexico rivers
- List of Oklahoma rivers
- List of Texas rivers
- Pecos River
- Rio Grande
- Brazos River
- White River (Texas)
- Double Mountain (Texas)
- Canadian, Texas
- North Canadian River
- Canadian County, Oklahoma
