= Baron, Oklahoma =

Unincorporated community in Oklahoma, US

Baron is an unincorporated community and census-designated place in Adair County, Oklahoma, United States, located along U.S. Route 59 between Westville and Stilwell. It was built on the West Branch of the Baron Fork of the Illinois River, a tributary of the Arkansas River via the Illinois River. As of the 2020 census, Baron had a population of 243.

Baron is located at 35°54′00″N 94°36′01″W.

== Education ==
It is in the Westville Public Schools school district.

== Demographics ==
=== 2020 census ===
As of the 2020 census, Baron had a population of 243. The median age was 42.5 years. 16.0% of residents were under the age of 18 and 22.6% of residents were 65 years of age or older. For every 100 females there were 131.4 males, and for every 100 females age 18 and over there were 131.8 males age 18 and over.

0.0% of residents lived in urban areas, while 100.0% lived in rural areas.

There were 99 households in Baron, of which 35.4% had children under the age of 18 living in them. Of all households, 61.6% were married-couple households, 14.1% were households with a male householder and no spouse or partner present, and 22.2% were households with a female householder and no spouse or partner present. About 25.3% of all households were made up of individuals and 13.1% had someone living alone who was 65 years of age or older.

There were 103 housing units, of which 3.9% were vacant. The homeowner vacancy rate was 0.0% and the rental vacancy rate was 0.0%.

Racial composition as of the 2020 census
Race	Number	Percent
White	111	45.7%
Black or African American	1	0.4%
American Indian and Alaska Native	91	37.4%
Asian	7	2.9%
Native Hawaiian and Other Pacific Islander	0	0.0%
Some other race	3	1.2%
Two or more races	30	12.3%
Hispanic or Latino (of any race)	11	4.5%
