= Fort Coffee, Oklahoma =

- Town
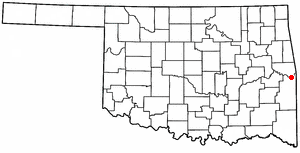
- Location of Fort Coffee, Oklahoma
- Coordinates: 35°17′39″N 94°34′23″W
- Country: United States
- State: Oklahoma
- County: Le Flore

Government
  - Type: Town

Area
  - Total: 6.53 sq mi (16.91 km^{2})
  - Land: 6.53 sq mi (16.91 km^{2})
  - Water: 0.0039 sq mi (0.01 km^{2})
- Elevation: 449 ft (137 m)

Population (2020)
  - Total: 335
  - Density: 51.3/sq mi (19.82/km^{2})
- Time zone: UTC-6 (Central (CST))
  - Summer (DST): UTC-5 (CDT)
- FIPS code: 40-27150
- GNIS feature ID: 2412639

Fort Coffee is a town in Le Flore County, Oklahoma, United States. Originally constructed as a U. S. Army fort in 1834, it was named for U. S. General John Coffee, a veteran of the Seminole Wars. As of the 2020 census, Fort Coffee had a population of 335.

== History ==
The town of Fort Coffee traces its beginnings to 1832, when the Choctaw Indian tribe was removed from the southeastern United States and transported to land in the eastern part of Indian Territory (now in the state of Oklahoma). Most of the travel was by water, and the site of Fort Coffee became a port on the Arkansas River.

In 1834, the Choctaw Nation petitioned the U.S. War Department to construct a fort that would stop the flow of alcohol and other illegal items from flowing into their territory along the Arkansas River. The garrison succeeded in its mission and also built roads connecting Fort Smith, Arkansas, Fort Gibson, and Fort Towson. The army abandoned Fort Coffee in 1838 when Fort Smith was reestablished. The site of Fort Coffee was located in Skullyville County, a part of the Moshulatubbee District of the Choctaw Nation.

In 1843, the Choctaw nation allowed the Methodist Episcopal church to establish the Fort Coffee Choctaw Boys Academy in the buildings. This school continued until the outbreak of the Civil War, when Confederate forces commanded by General Stand Watie occupied the site. The Union Army recaptured the fort in 1863. Most of the buildings were burned during this time. Several small houses were built using the foundation stones.

The Choctaw were required to release their slaves by the Reconstruction Treaty of 1866. Many of the freed men remained in the Choctaw Nation lands. Many of these were legally adopted into the Choctaw Nation in 1885, thus qualifying for land allotments by the Dawes Commission.

The local economy has largely been based on agriculture. Major crops included cotton, livestock and soybeans. There was a cotton gin in Fort Coffee to handle locally grown crops. The Fort Smith and Western Railway and the Kansas City, Pittsburg and Gulf Railroad (bought by the Kansas City Southern Railway in 1900) transported the products to outside markets.

The town of Fort Coffee did not incorporate until 1998.

== Geography ==
Fort Coffee is located 6 miles (9.7 km) northeast of Spiro.

According to the United States Census Bureau, the town has a total area of 6.4 square miles (17 km^{2}), of which 6.4 square miles (17 km^{2}) is land and 0.16% is water.

The town is just south of a bend of the Arkansas River, downstream from the Robert S. Kerr Reservoir, and north of U.S. Route 271, about 11 miles from the Arkansas border.

== Demographics ==
Historical population
Census	Pop.	Note	%±
2000	412		—
2010	424		2.9%
2020	335		−21.0%
U.S. Decennial Census

=== Racial and ethnic composition ===
Fort Coffee town, Oklahoma – Racial and ethnic composition Note: the US Census treats Hispanic/Latino as an ethnic category. This table excludes Latinos from the racial categories and assigns them to a separate category. Hispanics/Latinos may be of any race.
Race / Ethnicity (NH = Non-Hispanic)	Pop 2000	Pop 2010	Pop 2020	% 2000	% 2010	% 2020
White alone (NH)	108	92	83	26.21%	21.70%	24.78%
Black or African American alone (NH)	259	282	173	62.86%	66.51%	51.64%
Native American or Alaska Native alone (NH)	16	18	28	3.88%	4.25%	8.36%
Asian alone (NH)	0	4	1	0.00%	0.94%	0.30%
Native Hawaiian or Pacific Islander alone (NH)	0	0	0	0.00%	0.00%	0.00%
Other race alone (NH)	0	0	0	0.00%	0.00%	0.00%
Mixed race or Multiracial (NH)	29	24	44	7.04%	5.66%	13.13%
Hispanic or Latino (any race)	0	4	6	0.00%	0.94%	1.79%
Total	412	424	335	100.00%	100.00%	100.00%

=== 2020 census ===
As of the 2020 census, Fort Coffee had a population of 335. The median age was 49.1 years. 17.0% of residents were under the age of 18 and 25.7% of residents were 65 years of age or older. For every 100 females there were 81.1 males, and for every 100 females age 18 and over there were 90.4 males age 18 and over.

0.0% of residents lived in urban areas, while 100.0% lived in rural areas.

There were 148 households in Fort Coffee, of which 19.6% had children under the age of 18 living in them. Of all households, 39.2% were married-couple households, 23.0% were households with a male householder and no spouse or partner present, and 31.8% were households with a female householder and no spouse or partner present. About 33.1% of all households were made up of individuals and 19.6% had someone living alone who was 65 years of age or older.

There were 178 housing units, of which 16.9% were vacant. The homeowner vacancy rate was 0.0% and the rental vacancy rate was 10.3%.

=== 2000 census ===
At the 2000 census, there were 412 people, 163 households and 109 families residing in the town. The population density was 64.1 inhabitants per square mile (24.7/km^{2}). There were 176 housing units at an average density of 27.4 per square mile (10.6/km^{2}). The racial makeup of the town was 26.21% White, 62.86% African American, 3.88% Native American, and 7.04% from two or more races.

There were 163 households, of which 30.1% had children under the age of 18 living with them, 45.4% were married couples living together, 14.7% had a female householder with no husband present, and 33.1% were non-families. 31.9% of all households were made up of individuals, and 11.7% had someone living alone who was 65 years of age or older. The average household size was 2.53 and the average family size was 3.17.

Age distribution was 23.8% under the age of 18, 9.7% from 18 to 24, 24.0% from 25 to 44, 28.6% from 45 to 64, and 13.8% who were 65 years of age or older. The median age was 41 years. For every 100 females, there were 104.0 males. For every 100 females age 18 and over, there were 106.6 males.

The median household income was $26,827, and the median family income was $31,528. Males had a median income of $26,094 versus $22,344 for females. The per capita income for the town was $14,039. About 25.6% of families and 30.6% of the population were below the poverty line, including 36.9% of those under age 18 and 50.0% of those age 65 or over.

== Points of interest ==
Despite the Spiro, Oklahoma mailing address, the Spiro Mounds and the Spiro Mounds Archaeological Center are in Fort Coffee.

W. D. Mayo Lock and Dam, part of the McClellan–Kerr Arkansas River Navigation System, is just northeast of town, while a boat ramp with access to the river above W. D. Mayo Lock and Dam is just north of town.
