= Sans Bois Creek =

Location
- Country: United States

Physical characteristics
- Source
  - location: north of Wilburton, Oklahoma
  - coordinates: 35°01′39″N 95°21′58″W
- Mouth: Robert S. Kerr Reservoir
  - location: southwest of Keota, Oklahoma
  - coordinates: 35°13′48″N 94°59′29″W

Sans Bois Creek is the major east/west drainage basin in Haskell County, Oklahoma. It starts about midway between Wilburton and Quinton, and flows generally northeast to Robert S. Kerr Reservoir on the Arkansas River.

“Sans bois” is a French phrase meaning “without wood.” The Sans Bois Mountains lie across the southern part of Haskell County, as well as northern Latimer County, Oklahoma.

Popular species of fish caught in Sans Bois Creek include Largemouth bass, Common carp, and Blue catfish.

Several Civil War skirmishes were fought around Sans Bois Creek.

== Little Sans Bois Creek ==
Sans Bois Creek is not to be confused with Little Sans Bois Creek. That watercourse starts northeast of Stigler, Oklahoma and flows generally northeast to Robert S. Kerr Reservoir, roughly parallel to and north of Sans Bois Creek.
