= Pierre Antoine and Paul Mallet =

French Canadian voyageurs

Pierre Antoine and Paul Mallet, brothers and voyageurs from New France, were the first Europeans known to have crossed the Great Plains from east to west. They first journeyed to Santa Fe, New Mexico from Kaskaskia, Illinois in 1739.

== First expedition ==
Pierre Antoine Mallet (b. 20 June 1700, d. after 1750) and his brother Paul Mallet (b. ?, d. 1753, Arkansas Post, Arkansas), were born in Montreal, Canada and moved to Detroit in 1706 and Kaskaskia, Illinois in 1734. From Kaskaskia, in 1739, they attempted to travel to Santa Fe, New Mexico with six companions and nine horses loaded with trade goods. They followed the Missouri River north to South Dakota to the villages of the Arikara. It was believed at the time that the Missouri River flowed all the way to the Spanish colonies in New Mexico. Told by the Indians that New Mexico was to the southwest, they backtracked to the Pawnee villages on the Loup River in Nebraska. From there on May 29, 1739, they embarked for Santa Fe.

The Mallet’s account of their journey to Santa Fe was lost and their route can only be roughly approximated. They followed the Platte and South Platte River, which they called the River of the Padoucas (Padoucas probably refers to the Apache Indians who had inhabited this area a few years earlier). They followed the South Platte upstream to approximately the Colorado-Nebraska border, then turned south. While crossing a river (probably the Republican), they lost seven horses loaded with merchandise. They reached the Arkansas River near the Kansas-Colorado line and followed it upstream.

On July 5, probably near present-day La Junta, Colorado they encountered a village of “Laitane” Indians (Comanche). Among the Comanche was an Arikara Indian slave whom they hired as a guide to lead them to Santa Fe. He led them, probably following a route approximating the later Santa Fe Trail to Picuris Pueblo, New Mexico where they first met Spaniards and were “pleasantly received.” They proceeded onward to Santa Fe where they proposed opening trade relations between New Mexico and the French. After a nine-month wait in Santa Fe, the response from the government in Mexico City was negative and they were told they had to leave. However, they were given letters encouraging trade by New Mexican officials.

On May 1, 1740, the Mallets and their party left Santa Fe to return east. One of their men married a Spanish woman and remained in New Mexico. Three men split off to return to Illinois via the same route they had followed to New Mexico; the Mallets and two others followed the Canadian River eastwards from New Mexico through the Texas Panhandle and into Oklahoma. En route they encountered a Comanche village and traded knives and other items for horses. Later, probably in Oklahoma, they encountered several Padoucas (Apache) who were frightened of them, possibly because of experience with slavers. Downstream, when the Canadian became navigable, the Mallets abandoned their horses and made canoes and on June 24 they arrived at the junction of the Canadian and Arkansas Rivers and found there a hunting party of French Canadians. By boat they proceeded down the river to Arkansas Post and hence to New Orleans, Louisiana, arriving in March 1741.

== Second expedition ==
Although the Mallet’s first expedition had been a commercial failure, the French sent out a second, and larger, trade expedition to New Mexico. Andre Fabry de la Bruyere, a government official in New Orleans, was appointed to lead the expedition which left New Orleans in September 1741. The Mallet brothers and several other voyageurs and one Negro slave accompanied him. Fabry proceeded by boat up the Mississippi and Arkansas Rivers to the Canadian and then with agonizing slowness up the Canadian to the junction of the Little River near present-day Holdenville, Oklahoma. There he met a war party of 35 Osage who were in search of their Mento (Wichita) enemies. The river being unnavigable, Fabry attempted unsuccessfully to buy horses from the Osage and other tribes to continue the journey. In September 1742 he abandoned the expedition. The Mallets meanwhile, apparently disgusted with Fabry’s leadership, had departed on foot for Santa Fe. They were also unsuccessful and turned back to Arkansas Post where they lived during the 1740s. Pierre continued to trade and explore along the Canadian River.

== Third expedition ==
In 1750, the governor of Louisiana dispatched Pierre Mallet and three assistants to Santa Fe again. Paul Mallet, who married in 1744 and settled at Arkansas Post, did not accompany this expedition. Pierre Mallet had with him letters from New Orleans merchants offering trade of one-half million pesos. Mallet and his companions traveled by boat up the Red River, bought horses from the Caddo, continued overland to the Canadian River, and hence to Santa Fe.

However, the situation had changed since his previous expeditions. The Comanche had become hostile. They robbed Mallet of his trade goods. When Mallet arrived in New Mexico, the Spanish accused the French of selling guns to the Comanche and Mallet was arrested, jailed, and subsequently sent to Mexico City from where he may have been sent to prison in Cuba or Spain. He disappears from the historical record. His brother Paul died in 1753.

== Influence ==
Neither the French nor the Spanish made much use of the extensive geographic knowledge that the Mallet brothers acquired in their travels. It was not until the nineteenth century that the geography of western Oklahoma and the Texas Panhandle became known. The Canadian River in Oklahoma acquired its name because of the explorations made there by the Mallets and other French-Canadians.
