= Belvidere, Kansas =

Unincorporated community in Kiowa County, Kansas

- Unincorporated community
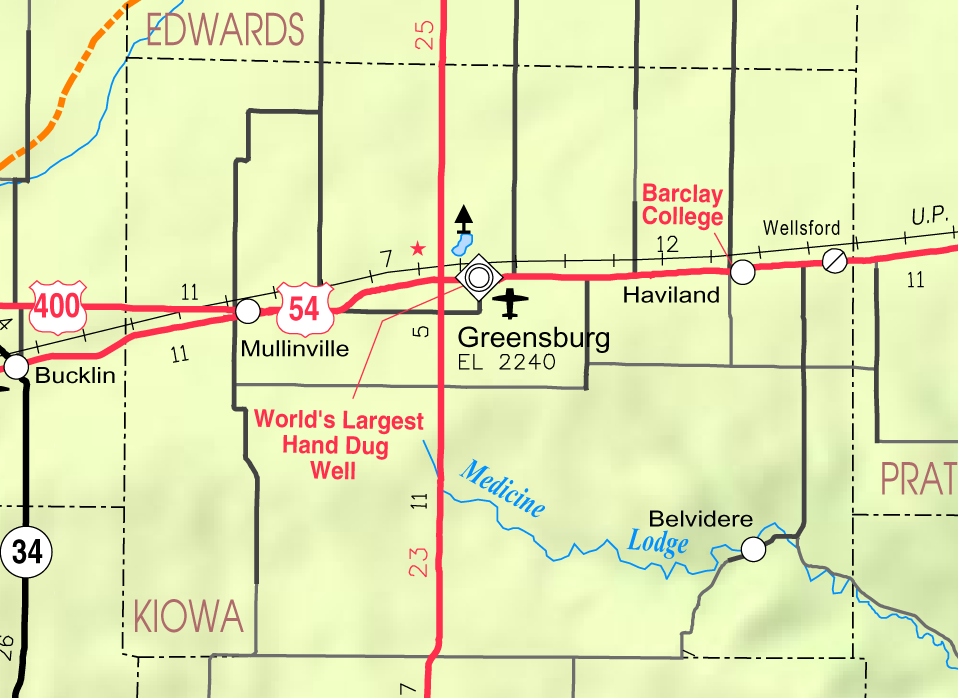
- KDOT map of Kiowa County (legend)

- Location within Kansas Location within the United States
- Coordinates: 37°27′01″N 99°04′48″W
- Country: United States
- State: Kansas
- County: Kiowa
- Founded: 1880s
- Elevation: 1,841 ft (561 m)
- Time zone: UTC-6 (CST)
  - Summer (DST): UTC-5 (CDT)
- Area code: 620
- FIPS code: 20-05875
- GNIS ID: 470715

Belvidere is an unincorporated community in Kiowa County, Kansas, United States, and located along the Medicine Lodge River.

== History ==
Belvidere was a shipping point on the Atchison, Topeka and Santa Fe Railway.

A post office named Glick operated from 1883 until 1890. The Glick post office was renamed Belvidere on April 26, 1890, remained in operation until it was discontinued on November 23, 1996.

Nearby are the Roth Petroglyph Site and the Star Petroglyph Site. Both are on the National Register of Historic Places.

In the mid-2000s, Belvidere become the home of a NOAA Weather Radio transmitter, WNG534, operated by the National Weather Service Forecast Office in nearby Dodge City.
