= Fourche Maline (Oklahoma stream) =

Tributary of the Poteau River, Oklahoma, U.S.

Coordinates: 34°55′24″N 94°48′03″W

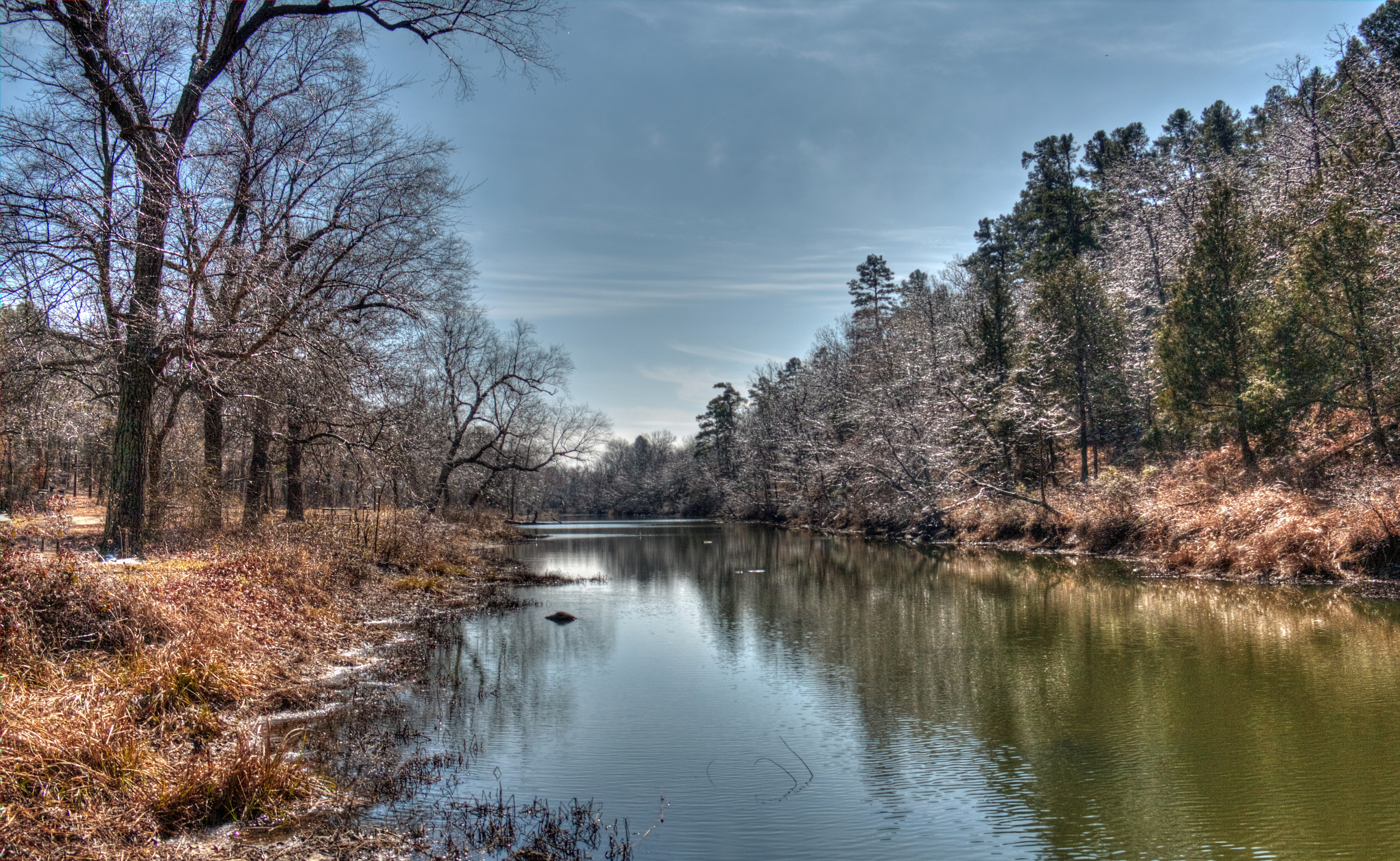
View of Fourche Maline

Fourche Maline (pronounced foosh-ma-lean) (Bad Fork, French) is a 70.0-mile-long (112.7 km) tributary of the Poteau River in Oklahoma. (Note: The stream name often appears in print as Fourche Marine River, Fourche Marine Creek, and simply Fourche Maline.) The headwaters of Fourche Maline are in the Sans Bois Mountains in northwest Latimer County. It flows southwestward through Robbers Cave State Park, then southeastward past Wilburton before turning eastward until it reaches the Poteau River in Le Flore County. Fourche Maline's confluence with the Poteau River is now submerged in Lake Wister, about 6 miles (9.7 km) south of the confluence. The distance from origin to confluence is about 37 miles (60 km) Oklahoma Historian Muriel Wright translated the French name as meaning "treacherous fork" in English. During the days of the Indian Territory, Fourche Maline served as the boundary between Skullyville County and Sugar Loaf County, two of the constituent counties making up the Moshulatubbee District of the Choctaw Nation.

== Fishing ==
Fourche Maline is habitat for the following species of fish:walleye, bream, bluegill, catfish, smallmouth bass, carp and rainbow trout. According to the Hook and Bullet source, the stream is about 5.3 miles (8.5 km) from Wister.

A 1.5 miles (2.4 km) section of Fourche Maline downstream of Carlton Lake Dam to the South Boundary of Robbers Cave Park is listed as a good area for rainbow trout by the blog Troutster. The same blog warns that trout generally fare poorly in Oklahoma summers. The state restocks trout every winter, starting November 1. At the Fourche Maline, the stocking season ends March 15.
