= Lake Wister =

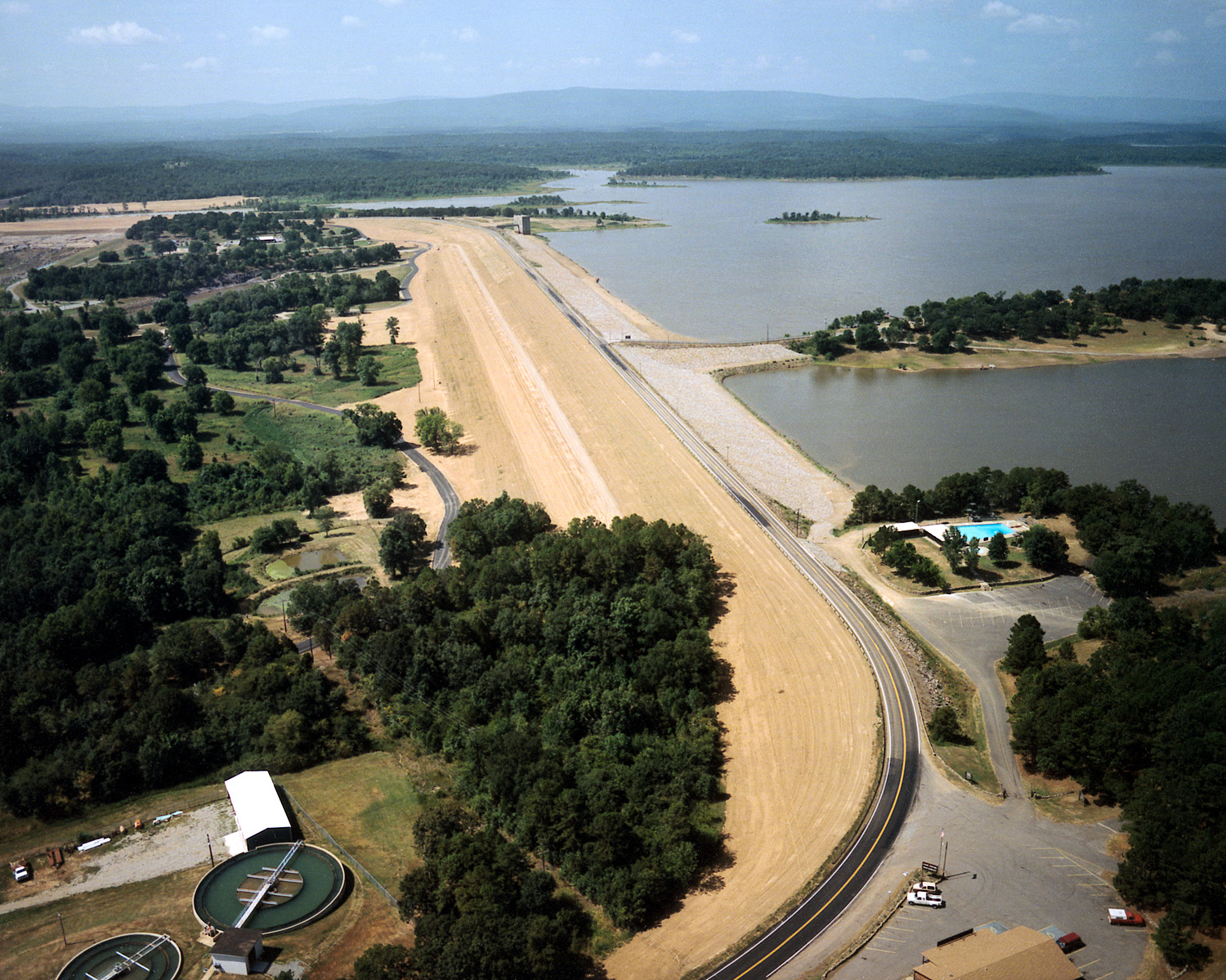
- Aerial view of lake and Wister Dam

- Location within Oklahoma Location within the United States
- Location: Le Flore County, Oklahoma
- Coordinates: 34°56′13″N 94°43′59″W
- Type: reservoir
- Primary inflows: Poteau River, Fourche Maline creek
- Catchment area: 993 sq mi (2,570 km^{2})
- Basin countries: United States
- Water volume: 49,400 acre⋅ft (0.0609 km^{3}) (conservation); 383,000 acre⋅ft (0.472 km^{3}) (full flood control)
- Surface elevation: 478 ft (146 m)
- Settlements: Wister, Oklahoma

Lake Wister is a reservoir in Le Flore County, in southeast Oklahoma. The lake is created by the Poteau River and the Fourche Maline creek. Wister Lake was authorized for flood control and conservation by the Flood Control Act of 1938. The project was designed and built by the Tulsa District Corps of Engineers. Construction began in April 1946, and the project was placed in full flood-control operation in December 1949.

== History ==
Lake Wister was authorized for flood control and conservation by the Flood Control Act of 1938. The project was designed and built by the Tulsa District Corps of Engineers at a cost of $10.5 million. Construction began in April 1946, and the project was placed in full flood-control operation December 1949. It is now part of Lake Wister State Park. The lake is named for the nearby city of Wister, Oklahoma. Other nearby cities are Heavener and Poteau.

The area around the lake has been inhabited for thousands of years. Numerous mounds in the area were created by prehistoric Native Americans. During territorial times, the area was located in Sugar Loaf County, one of the counties making up the Moshulatubbee District in the Choctaw Nation.

== Description ==
The lake has a surface area of 7,300 acres (30 km^{2}) and a shoreline of about 115 miles (185 km). The normal elevation is 478 feet (146 m), minimum elevation is 450 feet (140 m) and the maximum is 503 feet (153 m). Design volume of water is 61,423 acre-feet (75,764,000 m^{3}). It drains an area of 993 square miles (2,570 km^{2}).
