= Glover River =

Tributary in the Ouachita Mountains, Oklahoma, U.S.

Coordinates: 34°01′11″N 94°56′16″W

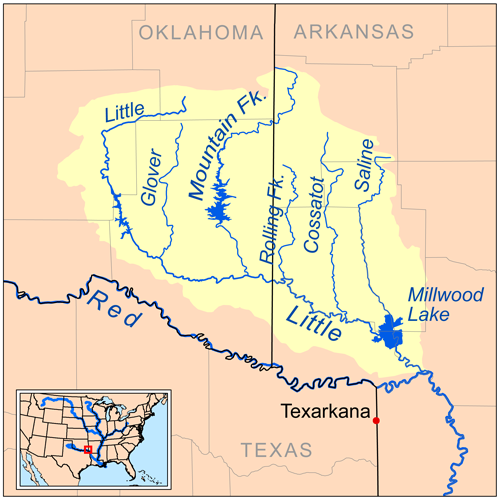
Map of the Little River watershed showing the Glover River

The Glover River is a 33.2-mile-long (53.4 km) tributary of the Little River in the Ouachita Mountains of southeastern Oklahoma in the United States. Via the Little and Red rivers, it is part of the watershed of the Mississippi River.

The Glover River flows for its entire length in McCurtain County. It is formed by the confluence of its East Fork, 22.4 miles (36.0 km) long, and its West Fork, 21.3 miles (34.3 km) long; both forks rise near the northern boundary of McCurtain County. It joins the Little River 4.5 miles (7.2 km) southeast of Wright City.

== Conservation and recreation ==
The Glover River is remote and little known, but has Class I and II rapids, good scenery, and canoeing and kayaking except in summer when water levels are often too low for floating. Its course is through a heavily forested area bordered by steep bluffs on each side of the river.

The Glover flows through the Three Rivers Wildlife Management Area, 203,215 acres (82,238 ha) owned by the Weyerhaeuser Company and mostly planted in Loblolly Pine plantations. A permit is required to access Weyerhaeuser lands.

== See also ==
- List of Oklahoma rivers
