= Sallisaw Creek =

Coordinates: 35°24′36″N 94°50′38″W

Sallisaw Creek is a 46.7-mile-long (75.2 km) tributary of the Arkansas River in far eastern Oklahoma. Its source is between Taylor and Doublehead mountains just south of Stilwell in Adair County. It flows in a southwestern direction through southern Adair County and central Sequoyah County before it empties into Robert S. Kerr Lake on the Arkansas River. The creek has four large tributaries. Greasy Creek meets Sallisaw Creek in southern Adair County, while Dry Creek and Brushy Creek join Sallisaw Creek near Marble City in northern Sequoyah County, and Little Sallisaw Creek flows into Robert S. Kerr Lake as it meets Sallisaw Creek.
