= Lake Jed Johnson =

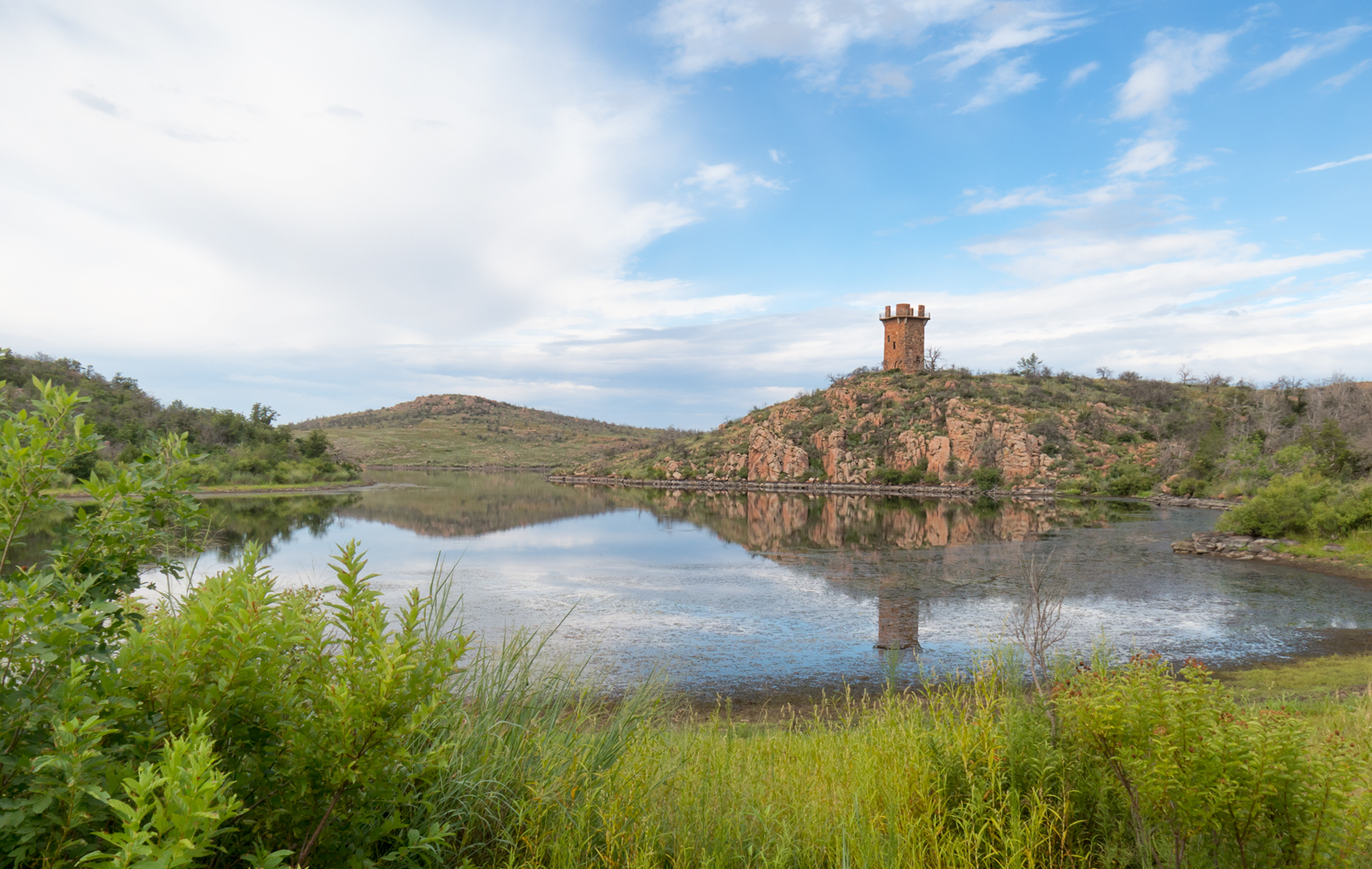

- Location within Oklahoma Location within the United States
- Location: Wichita Mountains, Comanche County, Oklahoma, US
- Coordinates: 34°43′45″N 98°36′0″W
- Type: reservoir
- Primary inflows: Blue Beaver Creek
- Primary outflows: Blue Beaver Creek
- Catchment area: 5.35 sq mi (13.9 km^{2})
- Basin countries: United States
- Managing agency: U.S. Fish and Wildlife Service
- Built: 1940
- Surface area: 57.5 acres (23.3 ha)
- Water volume: 1,190 acre⋅ft (0.00147 km^{3})
- Surface elevation: 1,608 feet (490 m)
- Settlements: Cache, Medicine Park, Meers

Lake Jed Johnson, named for Jed Johnson (1888–1963), is third largest of thirteen small reservoirs in the Wichita Mountains National Wildlife Refuge, located in southwestern Oklahoma. Lawton, Oklahoma, southeast of the lake and the fourth largest city in the state, is the nearest major population center. Smaller communities of Cache, Medicine Park and Meers lie north of the lake.

== General description ==
Created in 1940 by the construction of the concrete Jed Johnson Dam across Blue Beaver Creek in Comanche County, Oklahoma, Lake Jed Johnson has a surface area of 57.5 acres (233,000 m^{2}). Its primary purpose is preservation of wildlife habitat. and can be accessed by a boat ramp. Fishing is allowed, using hand-powered boats or other boats less than 14 feet (4.3 m) long and powered with trolling motors.

The surrounding area is home to deer, elk, Longhorn cattle and bison, and there are many opportunities for boating, fishing, hunting, and hiking throughout the refuge.

== Tower and trail ==
The Jed Johnson Tower sits atop a hill near the lake. It is a former fire watch station that was constructed by the Civilian Conservation Corps (CCC) in 1941, before the U.S. formally entered World War II. Now abandoned, it is not open to visitors, reportedly because it is considered structurally unsound. The tower is approximately 60 feet (18 m) tall.

The tower can be accessed using the Jed Johnson Trail, which is a 1 mile (1.6 km) long out-and-back trail from the lake shore. Primarily used for hiking, walking, trail running, and nature trips, the trail has an elevation gain of 68 feet (21 m) and is accessible year-round. Users may bring along dogs, but only if they are on leash at all times.

== See also ==
- Cache Creek
- Wichita Mountains
- Wichita Mountains Wildlife Refuge
