= Little River (Canadian River tributary) =

Tributary of the Canadian River in Oklahoma, United States of America

Coordinates: 34°59′49″N 96°21′54″W

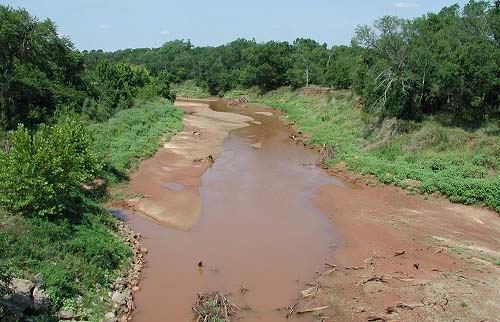
The Little River near Sasakwa, Oklahoma

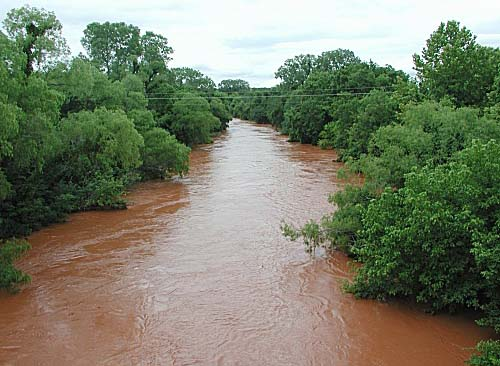
The Little River near Tecumseh, Oklahoma

The Little River is a tributary of the Canadian River, 90 miles (140 km) long, in central Oklahoma, United States. Via the Canadian and Arkansas rivers, it is part of the watershed of the Mississippi River.

The Little River rises in Moore in northwestern Cleveland County and flows generally southeastwardly through Pottawatomie, Seminole and Hughes counties. It joins the Canadian River about 5 miles (8 km) south of Holdenville. In Cleveland County, the river is dammed to form Lake Thunderbird. Downstream of the lake, several sections of the river have been straightened and channelized.

At Sasakwa, the river has a mean annual discharge of 360 cubic feet per second (10 cubic metres per second).

== See also ==
- List of Oklahoma rivers
