= Skeleton Creek (Oklahoma) =

Stream in Oklahoma

Coordinates: 35.988101°N 97.400319°W

Skeleton Creek is a stream in Logan, Kingfisher and Garfield counties, Oklahoma, in the United States.

Skeleton Creek was so named in 1867 by pioneers who found at the creek bones of Wichita Indians who had died during an outbreak of cholera.

At Lovell, the creek has a mean annual discharge of 146 cubic feet per second (4.1 cubic metres per second).

== See also ==
- List of rivers of Oklahoma
