= Sans Bois Mountains =

Small mountain range in southeastern Oklahoma

- Location within Oklahoma

Highest point
- Peak: Blue Mountain (Oklahoma)
- Elevation: 1,831 ft (558 m)
- Coordinates: 35°01′55″N 95°10′06″W

Dimensions
- Length: 45 mi (72 km) E/W
- Width: 19 mi (31 km) N/S
- Area: 505 mi^{2} (1,310 km^{2})

Geography
- Country: United States
- State: Oklahoma

The Sans Bois Mountains are a small mountain range in southeastern Oklahoma and part of the larger Ouachita Mountains. The range is a frontal belt of the Ouachita Mountains and is located in Haskell and Latimer counties. Sans bois is a French term meaning 'without forest' or without wood' in English.

== History ==
Humans have inhabited the area since prehistoric times. According to the Encyclopedia of Oklahoma History and Culture, the earliest inhabitants were hunter-gatherers and foragers from about 10,000 to 8,000 BCE. Later indigenous people began farming about 1 BCE along streams with suitable topography. The Wichita people moved in and established large villages during the Historic Era. The Choctaws, forced to leave their previous homeland in the southeastern U.S., started displacing other tribes in about 1830.

During the 19th century, this area became an important source for timber. Later in the century, production of coal and natural gas became economic mainstays, continuing into the 20th century.

== Geography ==
The highest peaks of the Sans Bois Mountains are 1,800 feet (550 m) above sea level. Robbers Cave State Park is in the middle of the mountains.

The Poteau River drains the area, and one of its tributaries, Sans Bois Creek, was the namesake for the mountains. Although the mountains have relatively light forests, they do have deposits of coal and natural gas, which provided the basis for economic development in the late 19th and early 20th centuries.
