= Medicine Lodge River =

River in Kansas and Oklahoma, U.S.

Medicine Lodge River A-ya-dalda-pa River, Hohkii'yohe, Medicine River
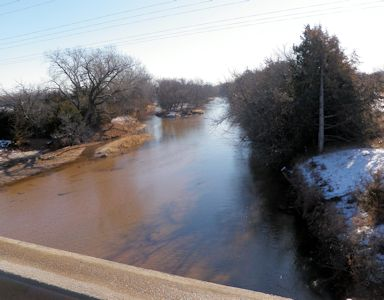
- Medicine Lodge River near Kiowa

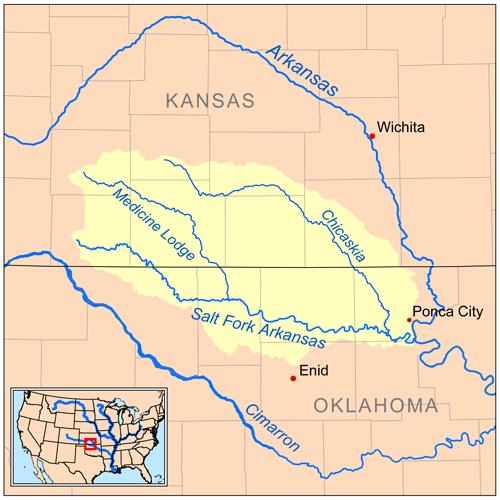
- Map of the Salt Fork Arkansas watershed including the Medicine Lodge River

Location
- Country: United States
- State: Kansas, Oklahoma

Physical characteristics
- Source
  - location: Kiowa County, Kansas
  - coordinates: 37°30′51″N 99°20′22″W
  - elevation: 2,330 ft (710 m)
- Mouth: Salt Fork Arkansas River
  - location: Alfalfa County, Oklahoma
  - coordinates: 36°49′40″N 98°19′38″W
  - elevation: 1,165 ft (355 m)
- Length: 130 mi (210 km)
- Discharge
  - location: USGS 07149000 near Kiowa, Kansas
  - average: 147 cu ft/s (4.2 m^{3}/s)
  - minimum: 0 cu ft/s (0 m^{3}/s)
  - maximum: 9,660 cu ft/s (274 m^{3}/s)

Basin features
- Watersheds: Medicine Lodge-Salt Fork Arkansas-Arkansas- Mississippi

The Medicine Lodge River is a 130-mile-long (210 km) tributary of the Salt Fork of the Arkansas River in southern Kansas and northern Oklahoma in the United States. Via the Salt Fork and Arkansas rivers, it is part of the watershed of the Mississippi River.

== Name ==
The Medicine Lodge River got its name from a large hut built by the Kiowa people, who believed the water from the river had healing properties if ingested or inhaled in a sauna type room.

The United States Board on Geographic Names settled on "Medicine Lodge River" as the stream's name in 1968. According to the Geographic Names Information System, it has also been known historically as "A-ya-dalda-pa River," "Medicine Lodge Creek" and "Medicine River."

== Geography ==
The river rises in Kiowa County, Kansas and flows generally southeastwardly through Barber County in Kansas and Alfalfa County in Oklahoma, past the Kansas towns of Belvidere, Sun City and Medicine Lodge.

It joins the Salt Fork of the Arkansas River in Oklahoma, about 5 miles (8 km) north-northeast of Cherokee.

== See also ==
- List of Kansas rivers
- List of Oklahoma rivers
