= Little Washita River =

Stream in Grady County, United States of America

Location
- Country: United States

Physical characteristics
- Source
  - location: east of Stecker, Oklahoma
  - coordinates: 34°57′02″N 98°15′29″W
- Mouth: Washita River
  - location: southeast of Chickasha, Oklahoma
  - coordinates: 34°58′37″N 97°51′34″W

The Little Washita River is situated generally between Chickasha and Lawton in southwestern Oklahoma. Its watershed comprises about 236 square miles (611 square kilometers) over parts of Caddo, Comanche, and Grady counties. The Little Washita is a tributary of the Washita River, and joins that watercourse southeast of Chickasha. The Washita River then drains into the Red River on the Oklahoma-Texas border.

Popular species of fish caught in the Little Washita include Blue catfish, Channel catfish, and Longnose gar.
