= Elm Fork Red River =

Coordinates: 34°52′17″N 99°19′01″W

- Map

Location
- Country: United States
- State: Oklahoma

The Elm Fork Red River is a river in Oklahoma. It flows into the North Fork of the Red River near Quartz Mountain State Park, about ten miles east of Mangum, Oklahoma.
