= Wister Public Schools =

School district in Oklahoma, US

Wister Public Schools is the school district of Wister, Oklahoma. It contains an elementary school and a combined middle/high school.
