= Cache Creek (Oklahoma) =

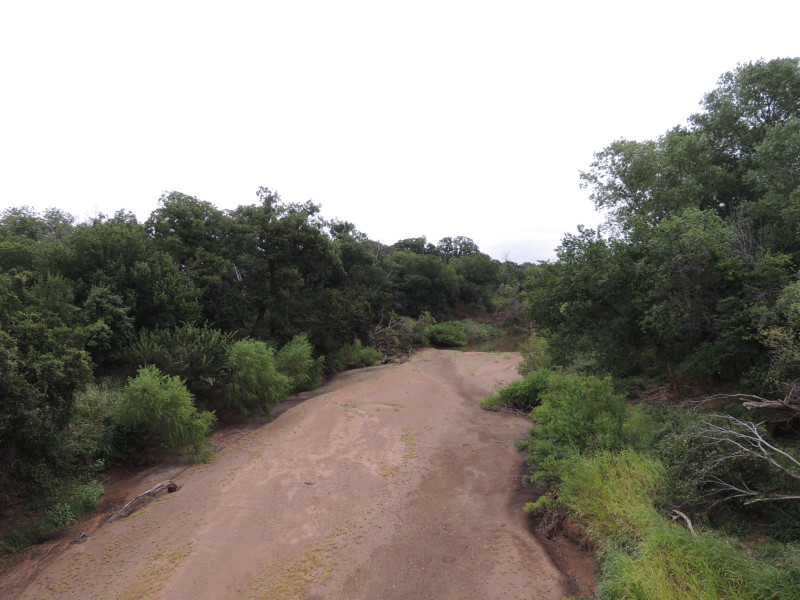
- Cache Creek sandbar geology including the periodic variations in stream flow and water level.

Location
- Country: United States
- State: Oklahoma
- Region: Southwestern United States

Physical characteristics
- Source: Confluence of East Cache Creek and West Cache Creek
  - location: Temple Cotton County Oklahoma, Southwestern United States, United States
  - coordinates: 34°12′23″N 98°18′23″W
  - elevation: 915 ft (279 m)
- Mouth: Red River
  - location: Taylor, Oklahoma, Southwestern United States, United States
  - coordinates: 34°08′00″N 98°16′05″W
  - elevation: 888 ft (271 m)
- Length: 5.5 mi (8.9 km)
- Basin size: 796 mi^{2} (2,060 km^{2})

Basin features
- River system: Red River
- Tributaries
  - left: West Cache Creek, Deep Red Creek
  - right: East Cache Creek

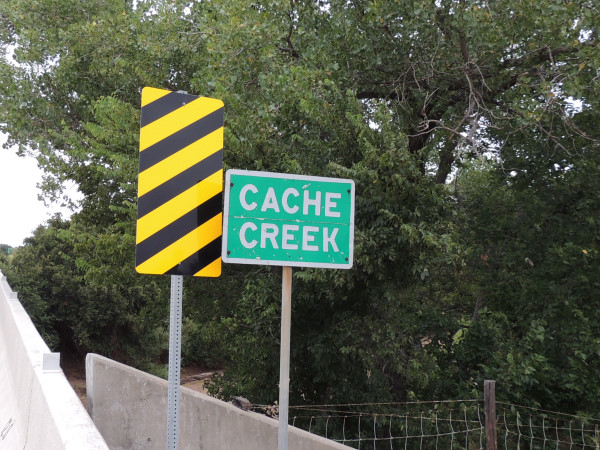
State of Oklahoma sign designating Cache Creek

Cache Creek is a small creek in Cotton County, Oklahoma and a tributary of the Red River. Cache Creek has a distance of 5.5 miles (8.9 km) from the Red River to the East Cache Creek and West Cache Creek basin. The East Cache Creek and West Cache Creek confluence is located 6 miles (9.7 km) southwest of Temple, Oklahoma.

Cache Creek has three primary tributaries East Cache Creek, West Cache Creek, and Deep Red Creek.

== East Cache Creek ==
East Cache Creek has a stream source located geographically 6.5 miles (10.5 km) northwest of Meers, Oklahoma. The creek routes to the Cache Creek basin located southwest of Temple, Oklahoma. East Cache Creek has a distance of approximately 50 miles (80 km) and rises from an elevation of 915 to 1,725 ft (279 to 526 m).

Elmer Thomas Lake, Lake Ellsworth, Lake Lawtonka, Little Medicine Creek, Medicine Creek, Snake Creek, and Soldier Creek are tributaries of East Cache Creek.

== West Cache Creek ==
West Cache Creek has a stream source located geographically 6.5 miles (10.5 km) south of Saddle Mountain, Oklahoma. The creek routes to the Cache Creek basin located southwest of Temple, Oklahoma. West Cache Creek has a distance of approximately 45 miles (72 km) and rises from an elevation of 915 to 1,961 ft (279 to 598 m).

Gramma Lake, Comanche Lake, Kiowa Lake, French Lake, Fish Lakes, Lost Lake, Quanah Parker Lake, Crater Lake, Canyon Lake, Crater Creek, Blue Beaver Creek, Lake Rush, Lake Jed Johnson, Ketch Lake, Pecan Creek, and Sandy Creek are tributaries of West Cache Creek.

== Deep Red Creek ==
Deep Red Creek has a stream source located geographically 4.5 miles (7.2 km) west of the Charon Gardens Wilderness Area near Odetta, Oklahoma. The creek routes to West Cache Creek located 5.5 miles (8.9 km) to the northeast of Randlett, Oklahoma. Deep Red Creek has a distance of approximately 43 miles (69 km) and rises from an elevation of 957 to 1,567 ft (292 to 478 m).

Lake Frederick and Little Deep Red Creek are tributaries of Deep Red Creek.

== Discharges ==
Name	Location	Discharge	Notes
East Cache Creek	Walters	223 cu ft/s (6.3 m^{3}/s)	
West Cache Creek	Cookietown	182 cu ft/s (5.2 m^{3}/s)	
Deep Red Creek	Randlett	168 cu ft/s (4.8 m^{3}/s)	
Cache Creek	Mouth	573 cu ft/s (16.2 m^{3}/s)	Discharge obtained by combining East & West Cache Creek & Deep Red Creek

== Stream Water & Watershed Data ==
- Varghese, Saji (1998). "Hydrologic Investigation of Red River Basin" (PDF). Oklahoma Water Resources Board. OK.gov - Oklahoma State Portal.
- Moreno, Maria A. (2011). "Hydrologic Investigation of the Beaver and Cache Stream Systems" (PDF). Oklahoma Water Resources Board. OK.gov - Oklahoma State Portal. Archived from the original (PDF) on September 5, 2015.
- "Watershed Planning Region Report: Beaver-Cache" (PDF). Oklahoma Water Resources Board. OK.gov - Oklahoma State Portal. 2012.

== See also ==
- Cache, Oklahoma
- Robinsons Landing Marina
- Wichita Mountains
- Wichita Mountains Wildlife Refuge
