= Wister, Oklahoma =

- Town
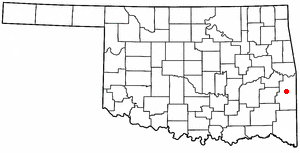
- Location of Wister, Oklahoma
- Coordinates: 34°58′10″N 94°43′16″W
- Country: United States
- State: Oklahoma
- County: Le Flore

Area
  - Total: 1.90 sq mi (4.92 km^{2})
  - Land: 1.89 sq mi (4.89 km^{2})
  - Water: 0.012 sq mi (0.03 km^{2})
- Elevation: 509 ft (155 m)

Population (2020)
  - Total: 1,031
  - Density: 545.9/sq mi (210.79/km^{2})
- Time zone: UTC-6 (Central (CST))
  - Summer (DST): UTC-5 (CDT)
- ZIP code: 74966
- Area codes: 539/918
- FIPS code: 40-81750
- GNIS feature ID: 2413504
- Website: www.wisterok.com

Wister is a town in Le Flore County, Oklahoma, United States. As of the 2020 census, Wister had a population of 1,031. Wister is named for Gutman G. Wister, an official with the Choctaw, Oklahoma and Gulf Railroad.

== History ==
A post office was established at Wister, Indian Territory, on June 30, 1890. The community was named for an official of the Choctaw, Oklahoma and Gulf Railroad, one of the two railroads that intersected in the town.

At the time of its founding, Wister was located in Sugar Loaf County, a part of the Moshulatubbee District of the Choctaw Nation.

Until it became known as Wister, the settlement had been known as Wister Junction, due to its location at the crossing of two railroad routes. The Choctaw, Oklahoma and Gulf Railroad was an east-west route linking Wister Junction with McAlester and passing through lucrative coal mining towns along the way. Its eastern terminus was at the St. Louis and San Francisco Railroad, a north-south route connecting Fort Smith, Arkansas with Paris, Texas. After receiving its post office, the town could no longer be known as Wister Junction, as federal post office regulations forbade new post offices from carrying descriptive names such as "Junction," "Mountain," or "Corner."

== Geography ==
Wister is located 55 miles (89 km) east of McAlester and 20 miles (32 km) west of the Oklahoma-Arkansas border.

According to the United States Census Bureau, the town has a total area of 1.5 square miles (3.9 km^{2}), of which 1.4 square miles (3.6 km^{2}) is land and 0.04 square miles (0.10 km^{2}) (2.04%) is water.

Wister is located on Lake Wister. Crappie, bass and catfish are the most frequently sought fish species in the lake. Along with fishing, Wister Lake also offers a wide variety of tourist activities such as camping, waterskiing, and swimming.

== Demographics ==
Historical population
Census	Pop.	Note	%±
1900	313		—
1910	498		59.1%
1920	586		17.7%
1930	761		29.9%
1940	763		0.3%
1950	729		−4.5%
1960	592		−18.8%
1970	927		56.6%
1980	982		5.9%
1990	956		−2.6%
2000	1,002		4.8%
2010	1,102		10.0%
2020	1,031		−6.4%
U.S. Decennial Census

=== 2020 census ===
As of the 2020 census, Wister had a population of 1,031. The median age was 39.0 years. 25.0% of residents were under the age of 18 and 19.3% of residents were 65 years of age or older. For every 100 females there were 87.8 males, and for every 100 females age 18 and over there were 84.9 males age 18 and over.

0.0% of residents lived in urban areas, while 100.0% lived in rural areas.

There were 408 households in Wister, of which 32.1% had children under the age of 18 living in them. Of all households, 48.5% were married-couple households, 15.4% were households with a male householder and no spouse or partner present, and 31.4% were households with a female householder and no spouse or partner present. About 26.7% of all households were made up of individuals and 11.0% had someone living alone who was 65 years of age or older.

There were 463 housing units, of which 11.9% were vacant. The homeowner vacancy rate was 1.4% and the rental vacancy rate was 5.4%.

Racial composition as of the 2020 census
Race	Number	Percent
White	720	69.8%
Black or African American	2	0.2%
American Indian and Alaska Native	179	17.4%
Asian	4	0.4%
Native Hawaiian and Other Pacific Islander	2	0.2%
Some other race	19	1.8%
Two or more races	105	10.2%
Hispanic or Latino (of any race)	61	5.9%

=== 2000 census ===
As of the census of 2000, there were 1,002 people, 412 households, and 276 families residing in the town. The population density was 694.3 inhabitants per square mile (268.1/km^{2}). There were 450 housing units at an average density of 311.8 per square mile (120.4/km^{2}). The racial makeup of the town was 83.93% White, 11.18% Native American, 0.20% Asian, 0.10% from other races, and 4.59% from two or more races. Hispanics or Latinos of any race made up 2.20% of the population.

There were 412 households, out of which 28.9% had children under the age of 18 living with them, 49.3% were married couples living together, 12.6% had a female householder with no husband present, and 32.8% were non-families. 29.9% of all households were made up of individuals, and 16.0% had someone living alone who was 65 years of age or older. The average household size was 2.43, and the average family size was 2.99.

In the town, the population was spread out, with 27.0% under the age of 18, 8.5% from 18 to 24, 24.7% from 25 to 44, 21.3% from 45 to 64, and 18.6% who were 65 years of age or older. The median age was 37 years. For every 100 females, there were 98.0 males. For every 100 females age 18 and over, there were 87.0 males.

The median income for a household in the town was $20,602, and the median income for a family was $26,417. Males had a median income of $21,154 versus $15,556 for females. The per capita income for the town was $11,851. About 15.5% of families and 19.4% of the population were below the poverty line, including 26.3% of those under the age of 18 and 19.1% of those age 65 or over.

== Education ==
Wister Public Schools operates public schools.
