= Panama, Oklahoma =

- Town
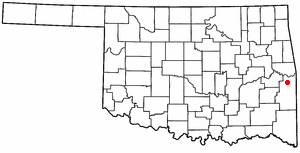
- Location of Panama, Oklahoma
- Coordinates: 35°10′16″N 94°40′08″W
- Country: United States
- State: Oklahoma
- County: Le Flore

Area
  - Total: 2.29 sq mi (5.92 km^{2})
  - Land: 2.26 sq mi (5.85 km^{2})
  - Water: 0.027 sq mi (0.07 km^{2})
- Elevation: 453 ft (138 m)

Population (2020)
  - Total: 1,269
  - Density: 561.7/sq mi (216.86/km^{2})
- Time zone: UTC-6 (Central (CST))
  - Summer (DST): UTC-5 (CDT)
- ZIP code: 74951
- Area codes: 539/918
- FIPS code: 40-56900
- GNIS feature ID: 2413104

Panama is a town in Le Flore County, Oklahoma, United States. As of the 2020 census, Panama had a population of 1,269.

== History ==
A post office was established at Panama, Indian Territory on January 14, 1898. At the time of its founding, Panama was located in Skullyville County, part of the Moshulatubbee District of the Choctaw Nation.

This town began as a coal mining community named Red Town because all of the miners' shacks were painted red. The origin of the town name of "Panama" is uncertain. Some historians claim that the name was inspired by the building of the Panama Canal. But since the town was already called Panama by 1898, the inspiration would have to have been based on the unsuccessful French effort at building the canal which started 1881 and ended in 1889, and not the successful American effort which did not start until 1904 and was not completed until 1914. In 1896 the Kansas City, Pittsburg and Gulf Railroad (trackage acquired by the Kansas City Southern Railway in 1900) built a north–south line through the region. The Midland Valley Railroad built an east–west line through the region in 1903–1904. The town of Panama moved to the crossing of the two railroads. The Panama post office first opened January 14, 1898, but the order was rescinded for some unknown reason on February 23, 1898. The post office reopened February 21, 1899.

Panama was still supported by coal mining in 1930. The Ozark Coal and Mining Company had established itself there in 1898, however the coal mines began to close in the 1930s. A creosote plant, established in 1937, provided some jobs for the former miners. The Panama Coal Company, which had engaged in strip mining, went bankrupt in 1977.

== Geography ==
Panama is located 9 miles (14 km) north of Poteau on State Highway 59.

According to the United States Census Bureau, the town has a total area of 1.5 square miles (3.9 km^{2}), of which 0.66% is water.

== Demographics ==
Historical population
Census	Pop.	Note	%±
1910	310		—
1920	568		83.2%
1930	754		32.7%
1940	880		16.7%
1950	1,027		16.7%
1960	937		−8.8%
1970	1,121		19.6%
1980	1,425		27.1%
1990	1,528		7.2%
2000	1,362		−10.9%
2010	1,413		3.7%
2020	1,269		−10.2%
U.S. Decennial Census

=== 2020 census ===
As of the 2020 census, Panama had a population of 1,269. The median age was 37.9 years. 24.8% of residents were under the age of 18 and 16.9% of residents were 65 years of age or older. For every 100 females there were 84.4 males, and for every 100 females age 18 and over there were 83.8 males age 18 and over.

0.0% of residents lived in urban areas, while 100.0% lived in rural areas.

There were 520 households in Panama, of which 34.6% had children under the age of 18 living in them. Of all households, 37.7% were married-couple households, 20.8% were households with a male householder and no spouse or partner present, and 34.8% were households with a female householder and no spouse or partner present. About 30.5% of all households were made up of individuals and 12.4% had someone living alone who was 65 years of age or older.

There were 607 housing units, of which 14.3% were vacant. The homeowner vacancy rate was 4.3% and the rental vacancy rate was 11.9%.

Racial composition as of the 2020 census
Race	Number	Percent
White	868	68.4%
Black or African American	14	1.1%
American Indian and Alaska Native	172	13.6%
Asian	11	0.9%
Native Hawaiian and Other Pacific Islander	0	0.0%
Some other race	13	1.0%
Two or more races	191	15.1%
Hispanic or Latino (of any race)	66	5.2%

=== 2010 census ===
As of the census of 2010, there were 1,413 people, 530 households, and 364 families residing in the town. The population density was 903.0 inhabitants per square mile (348.7/km^{2}). There were 626 housing units at an average density of 415.1 per square mile (160.3/km^{2}). The racial makeup of the town was 78.27% White, 13.09% Native American, 0.35% Asian, 2.12% from other races, and 5.52% from two or more races. Latino of any race were 4.53% of the population.

There were 530 households, of which 34.7% had children under the age of 18 living with them, 49.6% were married couples living together, 15.5% had a female head of family, and 31.3% were non-families. 26.4% of all households were made up of individuals, and 12.5% had a person 65 years of age or older living alone. The average household size was 2.57 people; the average family size was 3.12 people.

In the town, the population was spread out, with 29.1% under the age of 18, 9.3% from 18 to 24, 26.9% from 25 to 44, 21.3% from 45 to 64, and 14.93% 65 years of age or older. The median age was 34 years. For every 100 females, there were 90.0 males. For every 100 females age 18 and over, there were 90.2 males.

The median income for a household in the town was $23,385, and the median income for a family was $29,500. Males had a median income of $27,260 versus $17,679 for females. The per capita income for the town was $12,878. About 19.2% of families and 24.3% of the population were below the poverty line, including 30.8% of those under age 18 and 18.8% of those age 65 or over.
