= Lightning Creek (Oklahoma) =

Coordinates: 35°27′01″N 97°30′31″W

Lightning Creek is a waterway in Oklahoma City, Oklahoma. Much of the city's Southside lies within its watershed. It is a tributary of the Oklahoma River.

The stream begins as a drainage canal near S.W. 86th Street and Villa Avenue. The creek flows generally north, draining into the Oklahoma River near S.E. 15th Street and Santa Fe. Several city parks are located along the stream, including Lightning Creek Park where the creek crosses under Western Avenue, Draper Park between S.W. 44th Street and Grand Boulevard, and Oliver Park between Grand Boulevard and S.W. 29th Street.

The Lightning Creek basin experienced major flash flooding beginning on July 6, 2010, and continuing through July 8, as a result of the remnants of Hurricane Alex. On July 6, 13-year-old Gerardo Canales was playing near the creek and was swept away by the flood. His body was found two miles (3.2 km) from where he entered the creek.
