= Poteau River =

Coordinates: 35°23′15″N 94°26′03″W

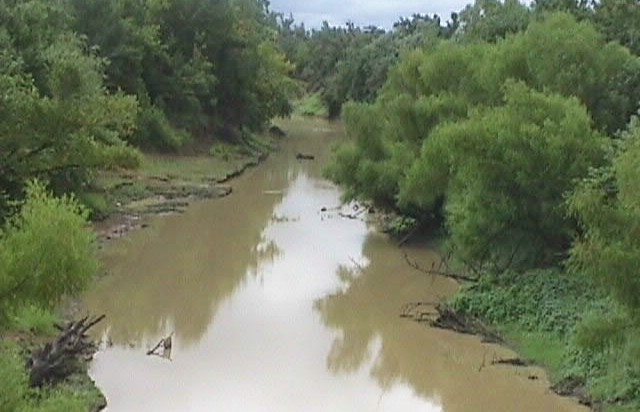
- The Poteau River near Panama, Oklahoma

Location
- Country: United States
- States: Arkansas, Oklahoma

Physical characteristics
- Source
  - location: Waldron, Arkansas
- Mouth
  - location: Fort Smith, Arkansas
- Length: 141 mi (227 km)
- Discharge
  - location: Panama, Oklahoma
  - average: 2,253 cu ft/s (63.8 m^{3}/s)

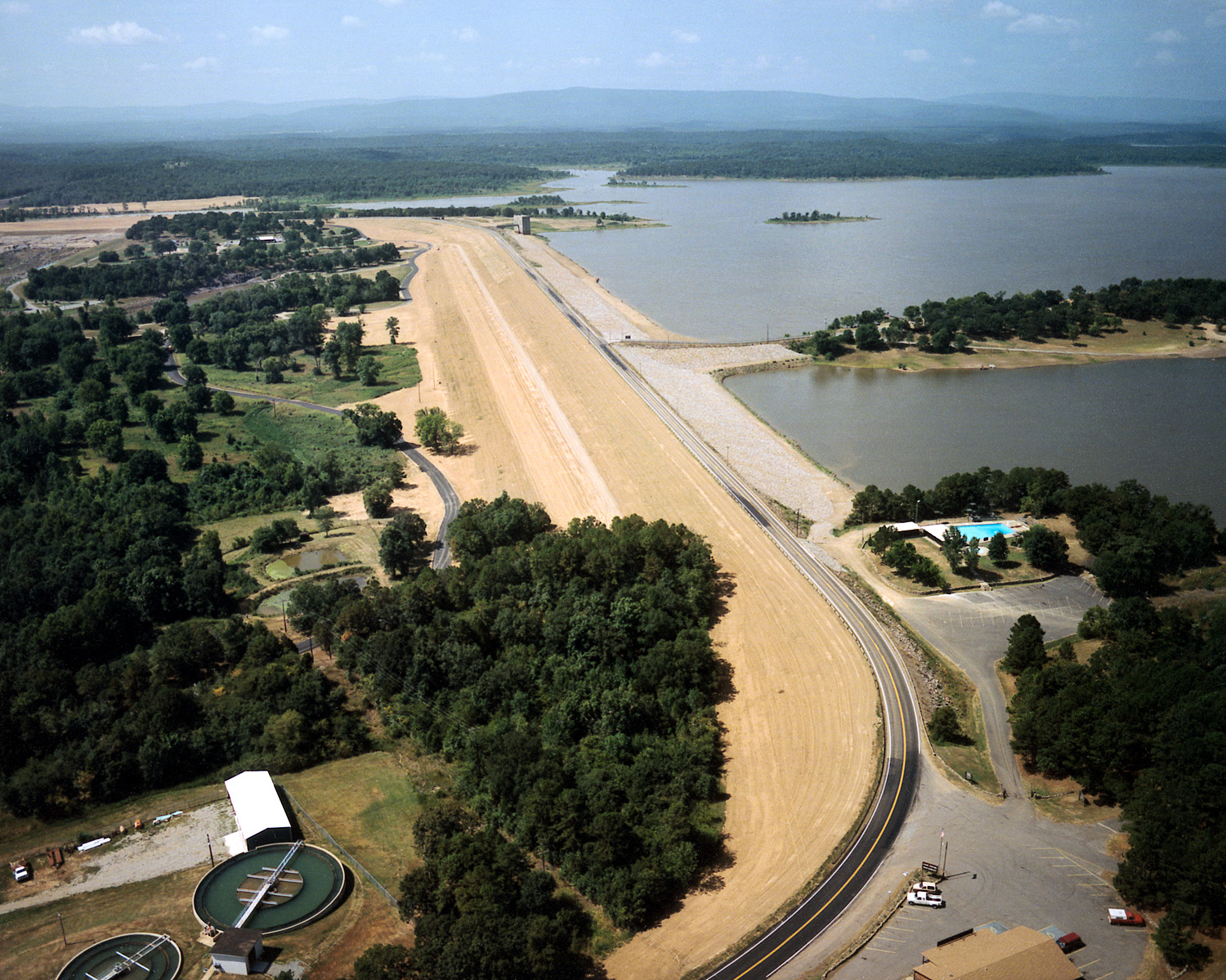
Wister Lake and Dam on the Poteau River in Le Flore County, Oklahoma

The Poteau River is a river located in the U.S. states of Arkansas and Oklahoma extending 141 miles (227 kilometers). It is the only river in Oklahoma that flows north and is the seventh-largest river in the state. The Poteau River is a tributary of the Arkansas River, which is a tributary of the Mississippi River. Prior to Oklahoma's statehood, during the Indian Territory period (1838-1906), the stream served as the boundary between Skullyville County and Sugar Loaf County, two of the counties making up the Moshulatubbee District of the Choctaw Nation.

The Poteau River also serves as the border between the states of Arkansas and Oklahoma for one mile to the south of Fort Smith. This border gives an additional 57 acres of land to Arkansas that would have instead been an exclave of the Choctaw Nation before 1905 when it was handed over to Arkansas.

== Etymology ==
Poteau is the French word for "post." It is believed that the river was named in 1716 by French explorers, led by Jean-Baptiste Bénard de la Harpe, who may have used a post to mark the mouth of the river. The nearby city of Poteau, Oklahoma takes its name from the river.

== History ==
In the 1820 Treaty of Doak's Sand between the United States and the Choctaw Nation, and later refined in the 1830 Treaty of Dancing Rabbit Creek, the boundary between Arkansas and the Choctaw ran from the easternmost point under Choctaw control along the Red River to the western edge of Fort Smith, Arkansas. This boundary created an area of approximately 57 acres that was legally Choctaw but was bound by Fort Smith in the East, the Arkansas River in the North, and the Poteau River to the southeast. This caused an effective exclave of the Choctaw Nation only accessible by passing through Arkansas.

This 57-acre area became a hotspot for outlaws avoiding the jurisdiction of Arkansas while being out of the functional jurisdiction of the Choctaw Nation. The area became known as "Coke Hill" due to the abundance of cocaine smugglers that utilized this loophole. In 1905, without consulting the Choctaw, the U.S. government handed the 57 acres over to the state of Arkansas, making the Poteau River the boundary between Arkansas and the Choctaw for around one mile.

This boundary was the de facto border in Oklahoma's constitution and remained the undisputed border until the 1985 U.S. Supreme Court case Oklahoma v. Arkansas. Oklahoma argued the territory was unjustly taken from the Choctaw and should be given to Oklahoma. The Supreme Court decided on July 1, 1985, that the established boundary favoring Arkansas would stand, making the Poteau River the border for approximately one mile between Oklahoma and Arkansas.

== Course ==
The Poteau River originates 2 miles (3.2 kilometers) south of Bee Mountain near Waldron, Arkansas, and converges with the Arkansas River at Belle Point, where it serves as a border between Oklahoma and Arkansas for a short distance. Tributaries of the Poteau River include the Fourche Maline, the Brazil Creek, and the Sans Bois Creek. Notable towns located along the river, in order from source to mouth, include Wister, Heavener, Poteau, Panama, Spiro, and Fort Coffee in Oklahoma, and Fort Smith in Arkansas.

== Lake Wister ==
The construction of the Wister Dam near river mile 70 of the Poteau River created the reservoir Lake Wister in December 1949. Lake Wister State Park has since been built around the reservoir. The lake and dam both take their name from the nearby town of Wister, Oklahoma.

== Oklahoma Runestones ==
Numerous runestones have been found in Oklahoma and are believed by locals to be the works of Viking explorers who traveled up the Poteau River after navigating the Mississippi and Arkansas Rivers. The evidence surrounding these claims is sparse and inconsistent, however.

The most credible artifact that has been discovered is the "Heavener Runestone," which can be seen in Heavener Runestone Park located in Heavener, Oklahoma.
