= Robert S. Kerr Reservoir =

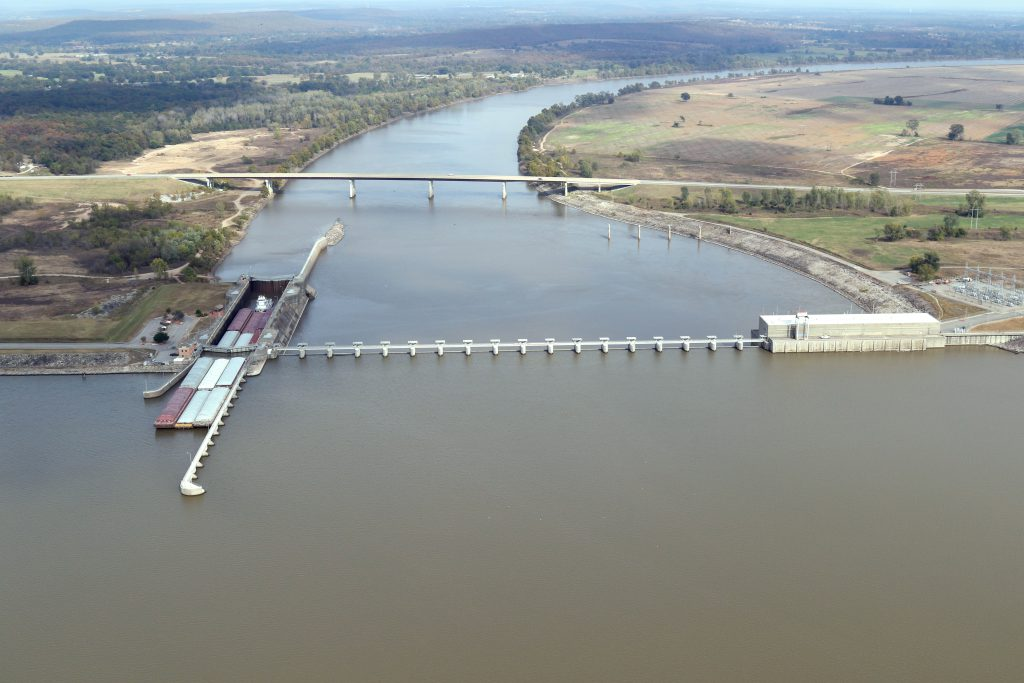

- Location within Oklahoma Location within the United States
- Location: Haskell / Sequoyah / Muskogee / Le Flore counties, Oklahoma
- Coordinates: 35°21′02″N 94°51′10″W
- Type: reservoir
- Primary inflows: Arkansas River
- Primary outflows: Arkansas River
- Catchment area: 147,756 sq mi (382,686 km^{2})
- Basin countries: United States
- Surface area: 43,000 acres (174 km^{2})
- Average depth: 11.75 ft (3.6 m)
- Max. depth: 52 ft (15.8 m)
- Water volume: 525,700 acre⋅ft (0.6484 km^{3})
- Shore length^{1}: 250 mi (402 km)
- Surface elevation: 478 ft (146 m) (normal pool)
- ^{1} Shore length is not a well-defined measure.

Robert S. Kerr Reservoir is located within the Cookson Hills, on the Arkansas River in Sequoyah, Le Flore, Haskell, and Muskogee counties in eastern Oklahoma, US. It is about eight miles south of the nearest major town, Sallisaw, Oklahoma. The reservoir is impounded by Robert S. Kerr Lock and Dam at river mile 336.2 (km 541.1) on the Arkansas River, just a few miles below its confluence with the Canadian River. The lock and dam are part of the McClellan-Kerr Arkansas River Navigation System, which provides for barge navigation on the Arkansas River and some of its tributaries. The U.S. Army Corps of Engineers maintains the locks and navigation system.

The lock and dam were constructed by the Corps of Engineers. Prior to starting construction in 1963, the project was identified as Short Mountain Lock and Dam, but was renamed in honor of the late Oklahoma Senator, who had spent much of his political career pushing for the Arkansas River to be made navigable. The project was completed in 1970 at a cost of $94.566 million ($501 million in 2007 dollars). The dam also contains a small hydroelectric power plant with four units capable of producing a combined total of 110 megawatts.

In 2002, the I-40 bridge disaster occurred when a barge hit a bridge that carried Interstate 40 over the reservoir.

== Recreation ==
The lake and surrounds are popular destinations for boating, fishing and hunting. Facilities at the lake include boat ramps, picnic areas, RV and tent campsites, swimming beaches, hiking trails and concession stands. The Army Corps of Engineers also manages over 10,000 acres (40 km^{2}) surrounding the lake for public hunting. Observation decks at the lake's visitors center allow guests to view barges and private watercraft as they pass through the lock system on the McClellan-Kerr Arkansas River Navigation System.

The lock, dam, and reservoir are named after Robert S. Kerr, former governor of Oklahoma and U.S. senator from Oklahoma, who died in 1963.

== Gallery ==
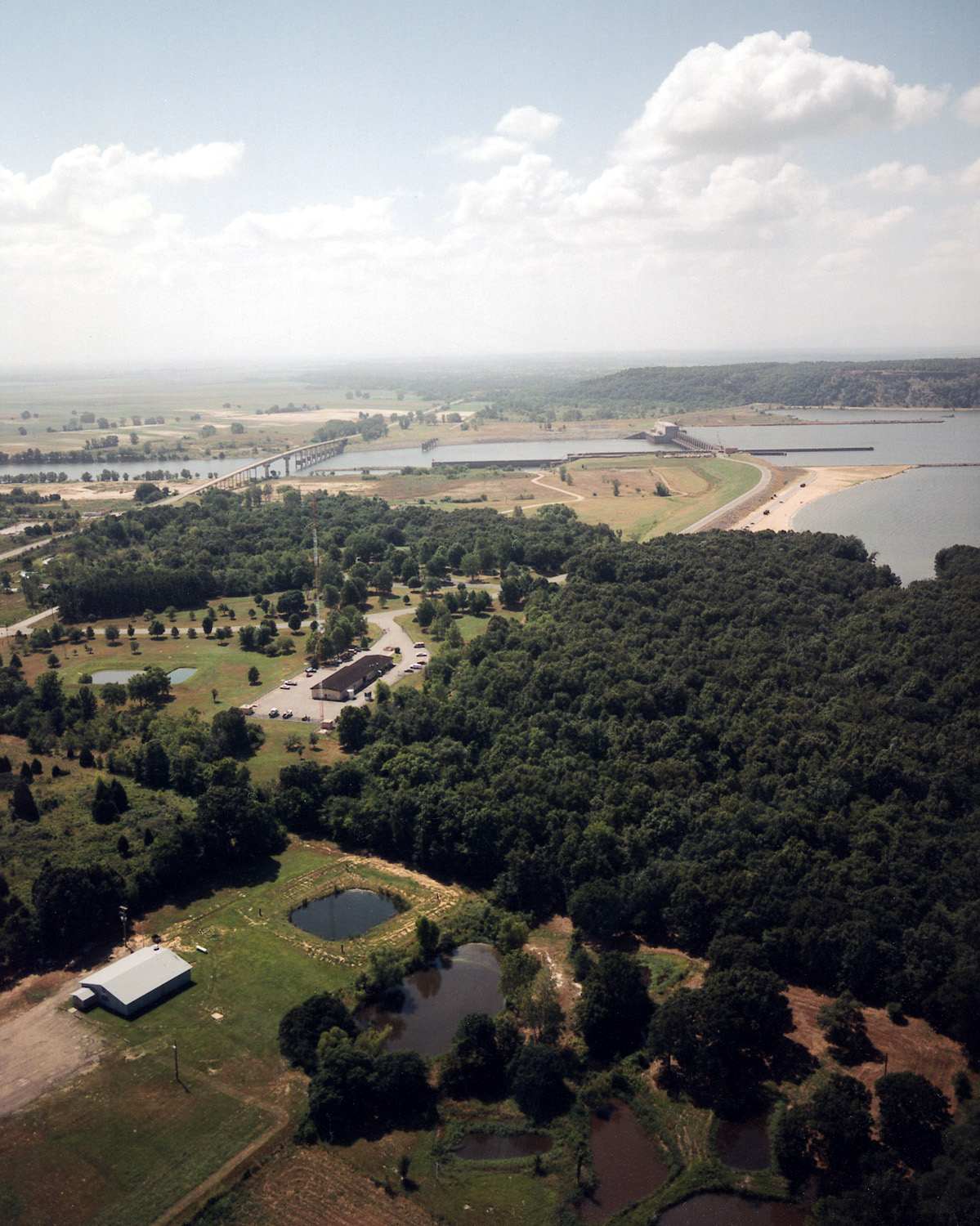

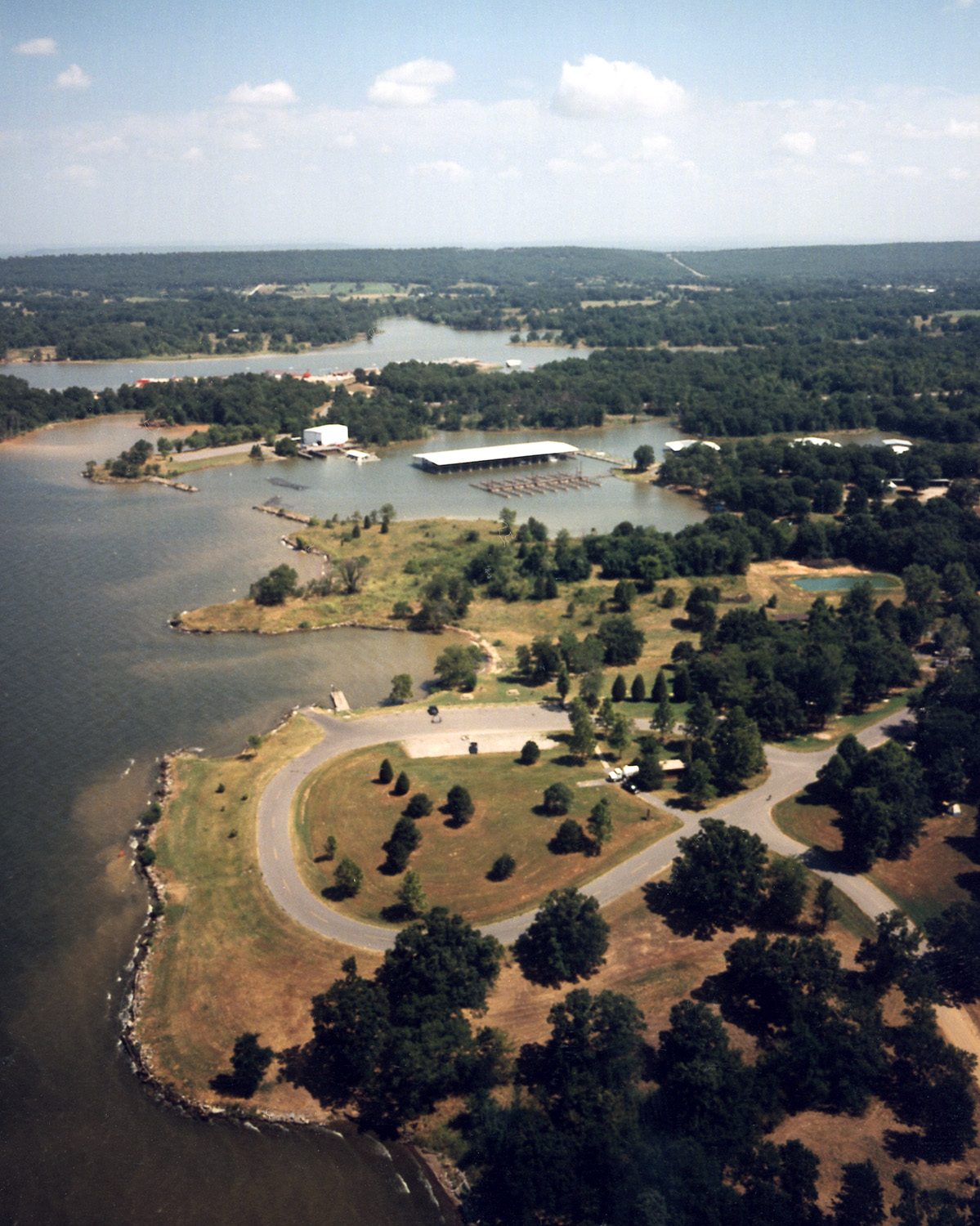
Aerial view upriver from lock and dam
