= National Register of Historic Places listings in Latimer County, Oklahoma =

Location of Latimer County in Oklahoma

This is a list of the National Register of Historic Places listings in Latimer County, Oklahoma.

This is intended to be a complete list of the properties and districts on the National Register of Historic Places in Latimer County, Oklahoma, United States. The locations of National Register properties and districts for which the latitude and longitude coordinates are included below, may be seen in a map.

There are 22 properties and districts listed on the National Register in the county.

This National Park Service list is complete through NPS recent listings posted March 21, 2025.

== Current listings ==
	Name on the Register	Image	Date listed	Location	City or town	Description
1	Administration Building	Administration Building	September 3, 2010 (#10000626)	831 SE 172 Rd. 34°48′26″N 95°18′29″W	Wilburton vicinity	
2	Ash Creek School	Ash Creek School	September 8, 1988 (#88001392)	Off Ash Creek Rd. 35°00′42″N 95°23′15″W	Wilburton	
3	Bowers School		September 8, 1988 (#88001393)	Off U.S. Route 270 on a county road 34°54′49″N 95°25′17″W	Wilburton	
4	Cambria School	Cambria School	September 8, 1988 (#88001394)	Northeast of Hartshorne; 34°53′00″N 95°30′18″W	Hartshorne	
5	Colony Park Pavilion	Colony Park Pavilion	September 8, 1988 (#88001395)	Veterans Colony; 34°48′41″N 95°18′28″W	Wilburton	
6	Cupco Church	Cupco Church	November 6, 1980 (#80003273)	South of Yanush off State Highway 2; 34°41′45″N 95°18′33″W	Yanush	
7	Degnan School	Degnan School	September 8, 1988 (#88001396)	Northwest of Wilburton off State Highway 2; 34°56′49″N 95°21′08″W	Wilburton	
8	Eastern Oklahoma Tuberculosis Sanatorium	Eastern Oklahoma Tuberculosis Sanatorium	April 6, 2011 (#10001008)	10014 SE 1138th Ave. 34°45′18″N 95°04′39″W	Talihina vicinity	
9	Edwards Store		April 13, 1972 (#72001069)	8 miles northeast of Red Oak; 34°59′50″N 94°58′17″W	Red Oak	
10	Edwards-Hardaway Homestead and Cemetery		December 7, 2021 (#100007234)	Norris Rd., 8 mi. NE of Red Oak; 34°59′53″N 94°58′22″W	Red Oak vicinity	
11	Great Western Coal and Coke Company Building		November 6, 1980 (#80003268)	701 E. Main St. 34°55′00″N 95°17′37″W	Wilburton	Demolished.
12	Great Western Coal and Coke Company Mine No. 3		November 6, 1980 (#80003269)	Off U.S. Route 270; 34°54′58″N 95°17′51″W	Wilburton	
13	Holloway's Station	Holloway's Station	April 13, 1972 (#72001070)	About 5 miles northeast of Red Oak; 34°58′39″N 95°02′54″W	Red Oak	
14	Lake Wister Locality		August 19, 1975 (#75001566)	Address Restricted	Wister	Extends into Le Flore County
15	McLaughlin Site		June 28, 1972 (#72001071)	Address Restricted	Red Oak	
16	Mitchell Hall	Mitchell Hall	November 6, 1980 (#80003270)	Eastern Oklahoma State College campus 34°54′33″N 95°19′18″W	Wilburton	
17	Panola High School and Gymnasium		September 8, 1988 (#88001397)	Off U.S. Route 270, on the southern side of the railroad tracks 34°55′40″N 95°12′52″W	Panola	Entire building has been either rebuilt or covered entirely with metal siding.
18	Pusley's Station		April 13, 1972 (#72001068)	2 miles southwest of Higgins; 34°41′52″N 95°28′15″W	Higgins	On private property -not accessible.
19	Riddle's Station Site	Riddle's Station Site	June 13, 1972 (#72001072)	About 3 miles east of Wilburton; 34°55′14″N 95°15′24″W	Wilburton	
20	Robbers Cave State Park	Robbers Cave State Park	August 23, 2002 (#96000489)	7.3 miles north of the junction of State Highways 2 and 270; 34°58′59″N 95°21′28″W	Wilburton	
21	Rosenstein Building	Rosenstein Building	June 27, 1980 (#80003271)	111 E. Main St. 34°55′12″N 95°17′57″W	Wilburton	
22	Sacred Heart Catholic Church and Rectory	Sacred Heart Catholic Church and Rectory	November 6, 1980 (#80003272)	102 Center Point Rd. 34°55′00″N 95°18′44″W	Wilburton	

== See also ==
- List of National Historic Landmarks in Oklahoma
- National Register of Historic Places listings in Oklahoma
