= Latimer County, Oklahoma =

County in Oklahoma, United States

- County
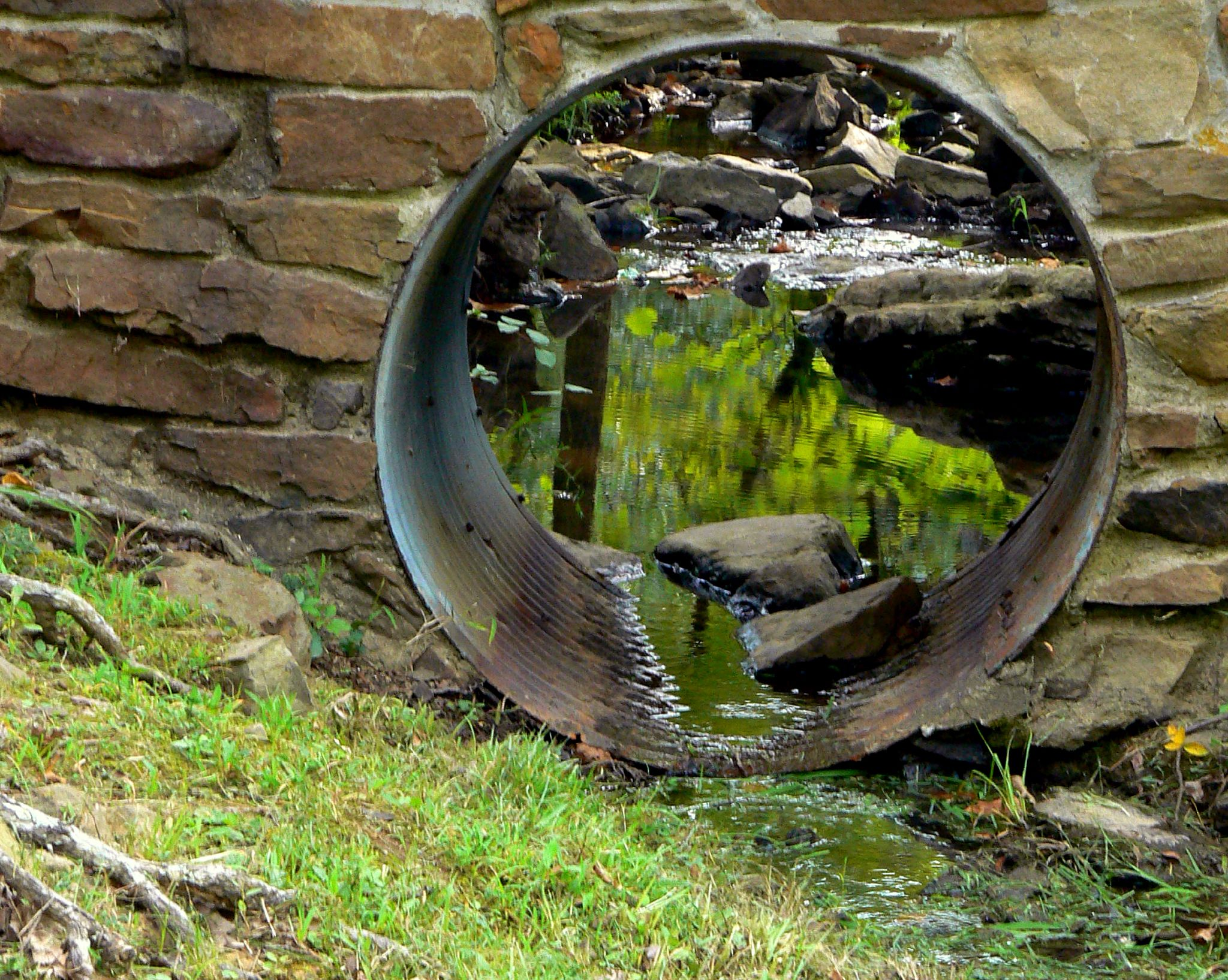
- Robbers Cave State Park

- Location within the U.S. state of Oklahoma
- Coordinates: 34°52′N 95°14′W
- Country: United States
- State: Oklahoma
- Founded: 1907
- Named for: James L. Latimer
- Seat: Wilburton
- Largest city: Wilburton

Area
  - Total: 729 sq mi (1,890 km^{2})
  - Land: 722 sq mi (1,870 km^{2})
  - Water: 7.0 sq mi (18 km^{2}) 0.95%

Population (2020)
  - Estimate (2025): 9,645 ▲
- Time zone: UTC−6 (Central)
  - Summer (DST): UTC−5 (CDT)
- Congressional district: 2nd

Latimer County is a county located in the southeastern part of the U.S. state of Oklahoma. Its county seat is Wilburton. As of the 2020 census, the population was 9,444. The county was created at statehood in 1907 and named for James L. Latimer, a delegate from Wilburton to the 1906 state Constitutional Convention. Prior to statehood, it had been for several decades part of Gaines County, Sugar Loaf County, and Wade County in the Choctaw Nation.

== History ==
This area was occupied for at least 3500 years by cultures of indigenous peoples. The most recent of the prehistoric peoples established complex earthworks during the Mississippian culture. Archeological excavations have revealed artifacts from Archaic, Woodland, and Mississippian cultures. Living in what is now southeastern Oklahoma, these peoples were direct ancestors of the Caddo Nation, a historic confederacy of tribes that flourished in east Texas, Arkansas and northern Louisiana before removal to another area of Indian Territory.

In the 1970s excavations at the McCutchan-McLaughlin site revealed many details about the lives and deaths of the Fourche Maline culture people, who lived in this area in the Woodland Period, about 300 BCE to 800 CE. These hunter-gatherers were physically healthier than later descendants in more complex cultures who depended on maize agriculture, but they were also often beset by warfare. Numerous remains were found in mass graves, killed by arrows or spears. This archeological site continues to be studied and has been listed on the National Register of Historic Places.

In 1831, the area now known as Latimer County was organized as part of the Choctaw Nation in the Indian Territory after the Choctaw were removed by the federal government from their traditional territory in the American Southeast. Following statehood Latimer County's boundaries were drawn to conform to Oklahoma's township and range system, which uses east–west and north–south lines as land boundaries. The Choctaw Nation, by contrast, divided its counties using easily recognizable landmarks, such as mountains and rivers. The territory of present-day Latimer County had the distinction of being the meeting point of all three administrative super-regions comprising the Choctaw Nation, called the Apukshunubbee District, Moshulatubbee District, and Pushmataha District. Within these three districts the land area of the present-day county fell within Gaines County, Jacksfork County, Sans Bois County, Skullyville County, and Wade County.

In 1858, the Butterfield Overland Mail established a route through the territory, which included stage stops at Edwards's Station (near present Hughes), Holloway's Station (near Red Oak), Riddle's Station (near Lutie) and Pusley's Station near Higgins.

The beginning of large-scale coal mining attracted railroad construction to the area to get the commodity to market. The chief coal mining areas were in the mountains in the north of the county, in the Choctaw Segregated Coal Lands. Coal mining companies were rapidly established in the late 19th and early 20th centuries. In 1889–90, the Choctaw Coal and Railway Company (later known as the Choctaw, Oklahoma and Gulf Railroad, and still later as part of the Chicago, Rock Island and Pacific Railway) laid 67.4 miles of track from Wister to McAlester. The Missouri, Kansas and Texas Railway (Katy) completed a branch line from North McAlester to Wilburton in 1904.

As a prelude to Oklahoma being admitted as a state to the Union, the Dawes Act was extended to the Choctaw and others of the Five Civilized Tribes. These had all been removed from the Southeast. Choctaw tribal control of communal lands was dissolved, and the lands were allotted to individual households of tribal members, in an effort to encourage subsistence farming on the European-American model. The Choctaw lost most of their land, with individuals retaining about one-quarter of the land in the county. The government declared any remaining land to be 'surplus;' it was sold, mostly to non-Natives. Tribal governments were also dissolved, and Oklahoma became a state. McGirt v. Oklahoma, 591 U.S. ___ (2020), was a landmark[1][2] United States Supreme Court case which ruled that, as pertaining to the Major Crimes Act, much of the eastern portion of the state of Oklahoma remains as Native American lands of the prior Indian reservations of the Five Civilized Tribes, never disestablished by Congress as part of the Oklahoma Enabling Act of 1906. As such, prosecution of crimes by Native Americans on these lands falls into the jurisdiction of the tribal courts and federal judiciary under the Major Crimes Act, rather than Oklahoma's courts.

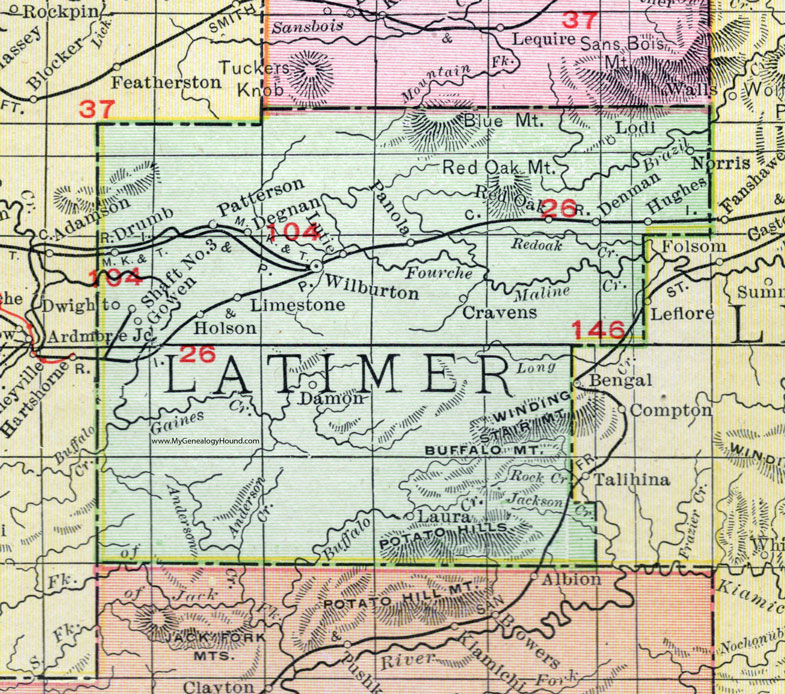
Latimer County, Oklahoma, 1911.

By 1912, the newly organized county had 27 mines; some 3,000 miners produced 5,000 tons of coal per day. Most coal was produced by the large companies. Native-born whites held most of the jobs as miners, but African Americans, European immigrants from the British Isles and Italy, and Mexicans also worked as laborers in the mining industry.

In less than two decades, the coal industry collapsed, due to labor unrest seeking relief from harsh working conditions and unfair labor practices, competition from oils, and the effects of the Great Depression. From 1920 to 1930, the county lost about 2,000 people, who sought work in other areas. By 1932, only one mine still operated in the county. Mining towns lost almost half of their populations, and at one point, 93.5 percent of those remaining in the country were surviving on government relief, through programs started by the administration of President Franklin D. Roosevelt. Federal construction projects to build infrastructure and invest for the future provided many jobs for the unemployed. Locally such projects included Wilburton Municipal Airport, schools at Panola and elsewhere, and road-paving works. The Civilian Conservation Corps (CCC), another federal program conducted in collaboration with state governments, developed a park project at the state game preserve, now part of Robbers Cave State Park.

In 1933, Spanish–American War veterans established Veterans Colony in the county, buying land together. The war veterans could build cabins here and grow their own food, living year round in a community. In later years, membership was opened to veterans of all wars. Veterans Colony still operates.

== Geography ==
According to the U.S. Census Bureau, the county has a total area of 729 square miles (1,890 km^{2}), of which 722 square miles (1,870 km^{2}) is land and 7.0 square miles (18 km^{2}) (1.0%) is water.

The Sans Bois Mountains span the northern border of the county, while the Winding Stair Mountains extend into its southern part. The Fourche Maline, Brazil and Sans Bois creeks drain the northern part of the county into the Poteau River, a tributary of the Arkansas River. Buffalo and Gaines Creeks drain the southern part into the Kiamichi River, a tributary of the Red River.

=== Major highways ===
- U.S. Highway 270
- State Highway 1
- State Highway 2
- State Highway 63
- State Highway 82

=== Adjacent counties ===
- Haskell County (north)
- Le Flore County (east)
- Pushmataha County (south)
- Pittsburg County (west)

== Demographics ==
Historical population
Census	Pop.	Note	%±
1910	11,321		—
1920	13,866		22.5%
1930	11,184		−19.3%
1940	12,380		10.7%
1950	9,690		−21.7%
1960	7,738		−20.1%
1970	8,601		11.2%
1980	9,840		14.4%
1990	10,333		5.0%
2000	10,692		3.5%
2010	11,154		4.3%
2020	9,444		−15.3%
2025 (est.)	9,645	▲	2.1%
U.S. Decennial Census; 1790-1960 1900-1990; 1990-2000 2010

Latimer County, Oklahoma – Racial composition
Race (NH = Non-Hispanic)	2020	2010	2000	1990	1980
White alone (NH)	61.6% (5,818)	69.2% (7,718)	72.5% (7,747)	82.1% (8,488)	83.2% (8,186)
Black alone (NH)	0.4% (42)	0.7% (80)	0.9% (99)	1.5% (150)	1.9% (190)
American Indian alone (NH)	23.5% (2,216)	19.9% (2,215)	19.2% (2,050)	15.1% (1,561)	13.8% (1,355)
Asian alone (NH)	0.7% (67)	0.3% (31)	0.2% (18)	0.2% (18)	0.2% (24)
Pacific Islander alone (NH)	0.1% (5)	0% (1)	0% (1)		
Other race alone (NH)	0.2% (16)	0% (2)	0.1% (6)	0% (1)	0% (0)
Multiracial (NH)	9.9% (936)	7.3% (814)	5.7% (607)	—	—
Hispanic/Latino (any race)	3.6% (344)	2.6% (293)	1.5% (164)	1.1% (115)	0.9% (85)

=== 2020 census ===
As of the 2020 United States census, the county had a population of 9,444. Of the residents, 22.6% were under the age of 18 and 21.1% were 65 years of age or older; the median age was 42.4 years. For every 100 females there were 96.8 males, and for every 100 females age 18 and over there were 93.7 males.

The racial makeup of the county was 62.7% White, 0.5% Black or African American, 24.2% American Indian and Alaska Native, 0.7% Asian, 0.8% from some other race, and 11.1% from two or more races. Hispanic or Latino residents of any race comprised 3.6% of the population.

There were 3,794 households in the county, of which 29.7% had children under the age of 18 living with them and 27.7% had a female householder with no spouse or partner present. About 30.8% of all households were made up of individuals and 15.2% had someone living alone who was 65 years of age or older.

There were 4,669 housing units, of which 18.7% were vacant. Among occupied housing units, 72.5% were owner-occupied and 27.5% were renter-occupied. The homeowner vacancy rate was 2.2% and the rental vacancy rate was 14.0%.

The most reported ancestries in 2020 were:

- English (13.8%)
- Choctaw (13.4%)
- Irish (10.7%)
- The Choctaw Nation of Oklahoma (9.3%)
- German (6.4%)
- Cherokee (4.8%)
- Mexican (2.8%)
- Italian (1.6%)
- Scottish (1.4%)
- The Chickasaw Nation (1.2%)

=== 2000 census ===
As of the 2000 census, there were 10,692 people, 3,951 households, and 2,868 families residing in the county. The population density was 15 people per square mile (5.8 people/km^{2}). There were 4,709 housing units at an average density of 6 units per square mile (2.3/km^{2}). The racial makeup of the county was 73.01% White, 0.96% Black or African American, 19.42% Native American, 0.18% Asian, 0.01% Pacific Islander, 0.51% from other races, and 5.91% from two or more races. 1.53% of the population were Hispanic or Latino of any race. 20.7% were of American, 9.5% Irish, 8.1% German and 5.0% English ancestry.

There were 3,951 households, out of which 32.20% had children under the age of 18 living with them, 56.90% were married couples living together, 11.50% had a female householder with no husband present, and 27.40% were non-families. 24.90% of all households were made up of individuals, and 12.30% had someone living alone who was 65 years of age or older. The average household size was 2.54 and the average family size was 3.00.

In the county, the population was spread out, with 25.70% under the age of 18, 11.40% from 18 to 24, 24.20% from 25 to 44, 22.50% from 45 to 64, and 16.10% who were 65 years of age or older. The median age was 37 years. For every 100 females there were 97.50 males. For every 100 females age 18 and over, there were 94.70 males.

The median income for a household in the county was $23,962, and the median income for a family was $29,661. Males had a median income of $27,449 versus $19,577 for females. The per capita income for the county was $12,842. About 19.00% of families and 22.70% of the population were below the poverty line, including 30.70% of those under age 18 and 16.40% of those age 65 or over.

== Politics ==
Despite the county being home to a significant Native American population, Latimer County voted Republican in every presidential election in the 21st century. Following the lead of most rural counties nationwide, the Republican candidate has won at least 60% of the vote in the county since 2008, with Donald Trump topping out at 80.9% in 2020.

Voter Registration and Party Enrollment as of June 30, 2023
Party	Number of Voters	Percentage
Democratic	2,384	40.26%
Republican	2,831	47.81%
Others	706	11.92%
Total	5,921	100%

United States presidential election results for Latimer County, Oklahoma
Year	Republican		Democratic		Third party(ies)	
Year	No.	%	No.	%	No.	%
1908	616	39.95%	726	47.08%	200	12.97%
1912	482	31.12%	722	46.61%	345	22.27%
1916	663	33.84%	950	48.49%	346	17.66%
1920	1,410	47.94%	1,200	40.80%	331	11.25%
1924	971	35.94%	1,457	53.92%	274	10.14%
1928	1,368	45.77%	1,583	52.96%	38	1.27%
1932	728	18.92%	3,119	81.08%	0	0.00%
1936	1,344	31.36%	2,923	68.20%	19	0.44%
1940	1,600	33.57%	3,138	65.84%	28	0.59%
1944	1,296	39.82%	1,948	59.85%	11	0.34%
1948	919	26.60%	2,536	73.40%	0	0.00%
1952	1,668	42.22%	2,283	57.78%	0	0.00%
1956	1,387	41.02%	1,994	58.98%	0	0.00%
1960	1,454	48.66%	1,534	51.34%	0	0.00%
1964	849	26.99%	2,297	73.01%	0	0.00%
1968	1,091	32.73%	1,350	40.50%	892	26.76%
1972	2,520	64.80%	1,239	31.86%	130	3.34%
1976	1,312	32.57%	2,661	66.06%	55	1.37%
1980	1,737	43.80%	2,105	53.08%	124	3.13%
1984	2,210	53.90%	1,858	45.32%	32	0.78%
1988	1,830	43.23%	2,365	55.87%	38	0.90%
1992	1,212	24.81%	2,606	53.35%	1,067	21.84%
1996	1,189	29.70%	2,222	55.51%	592	14.79%
2000	1,739	47.40%	1,865	50.83%	65	1.77%
2004	2,535	56.58%	1,945	43.42%	0	0.00%
2008	2,860	68.54%	1,313	31.46%	0	0.00%
2012	2,628	69.19%	1,170	30.81%	0	0.00%
2016	3,100	76.43%	797	19.65%	159	3.92%
2020	3,437	80.89%	762	17.93%	50	1.18%
2024	3,356	82.28%	681	16.70%	42	1.03%

== Economy ==
Coal mining was the basis of the county economy even before statehood, with mines operating by 1895. By 1912, The county 27 mines and about three thousand miners producing 3,000 tons per day. However, the industry collapsed during the 1920s due to labor disputes, competition from petroleum-based fuels and the onset of the Great Depression. Only one mine was still operating in 1933.

Agriculture was primarily limited to vegetables sold in the mining towns. Cotton, corn and cattle were the primary cash crops sold outside the area. After the coal industry collapsed, the main industries were cattle raising, lumbering and production of oil and gas.

== Education ==
In 1909 state government created the Oklahoma School of Mines and Metallurgy at Wilburton, placed centrally within the southeastern Oklahoma mining district. In 2000, as Eastern Oklahoma State College, the school was a two-year, liberal-arts institution.

== Communities ==
=== City ===
- Wilburton (county seat)

=== Towns ===
- Fanshawe (primarily in Le Flore County)
- Red Oak

=== Census-designated places ===
- Gowen
- Panola

== NRHP sites ==
The following sites in Latimer County are listed on the National Register of Historic Places:

- Administration Building, vicinity of Wilburton
- Ash Creek School, Wilburton
- Bowers School, Wilburton
- Cambria School, Hartshorne
- Colony Park Pavilion, Wilburton
- Cupco Church, Yanush
- Degnan School, Wilburton
- Eastern Oklahoma Tuberculosis Sanatorium, vicinity of Talihina
- Edwards Store, Red Oak
- Edwards-Hardaway Homestead and Cemetery, vicinity of Red Oak
- Great Western Coal and Coke Company Building, Wilburton
- Great Western Coal and Coke Company Mine No. 3, Wilburton
- Holloway's Station, Red Oak
- Lake Wister Locality, Wister (extends into Le Flore Co.)
- McLaughlin Site, Red Oak
- Mitchell Hall (Eastern Oklahoma State College), Wilburton
- Panola High School and Gymnasium, Panola
- Pusley's Station, Higgins
- Riddle's Station Site, Wilburton
- Robbers Cave State Park, Wilburton
- Rosenstein Building, Wilburton
- Sacred Heart Catholic Church and Rectory, Wilburton
