= KWLB =

KWLB and KIBE
KWLB: Red Oak, Oklahoma; KIBE: Broken Bow, Oklahoma; United States
- Frequencies: KWLB: 93.1 MHz; KIBE: 104.9 MHz
- Branding: Mountaineer Radio

Programming
- Format: Variety

Ownership
- Owner: Eastern Oklahoma State College

History
- First air date: KWLB: January 29, 2015
- Call sign meaning: KWLB: Wilburton, Oklahoma, where Eastern Oklahoma State College is located

Technical information
- Licensing authority: FCC
- Facility ID: KWLB: 190411; KIBE: 190410
- Class: KWLB: C3; KIBE: A
- ERP: KWLB: 19,500 watts; KIBE: 700 watts
- HAAT: KWLB: 76 meters (249 ft); KIBE: 54 meters (177 ft)
- Transmitter coordinates: KWLB: 34°55′2″N 95°19′51″W; KIBE: 34°2′1″N 94°44′35″W

Links
- Public license information: KWLB: Public file; LMS; KIBE: Public file; LMS
- Webcast: Listen Live
- Website: www.eosc.edu/about/mountaineer-radio

KWLB (93.1 FM) and KIBE (104.9 FM), known as Mountaineer Radio, are radio stations owned by Eastern Oklahoma State College licensed to Red Oak and Broken Bow, Oklahoma, United States.

== History ==
Eastern Oklahoma State College began broadcasting Mountaineer Radio as an internet station in 2010. KWLB began broadcasting January 29, 2015, after the college signed a deal with AT&T to build a 350-foot (110 m) tower for cellular service and the radio station. The format was a mix of top 40, adult contemporary, and some classic rock and country music, as well as student-produced news and college sports events.

== See also ==
- Campus radio
- List of college radio stations in the United States
