= Sacred Heart Catholic Church and Rectory =

Sacred Heart Catholic Church and Rectory may refer to:

- Sacred Heart Catholic Church and Rectory (Prescott, Arizona), listed on the National Register of Historic Places in Yavapai County, Arizona
- Sacred Heart Catholic Church and Rectory (Wilburton, Oklahoma), listed on the National Register of Historic Places in Latimer County, Oklahoma
