= Merlin Little Thunder =

Native American painter

- Born: 1956 (age 69–70); Clinton, Oklahoma, U.S.
- Citizenship: Cheyenne and Arapaho Tribes, United States
- Education: Southwestern Oklahoma State College, Bacone College, Eastern Oklahoma State College
- Alma mater: Canton High School
- Known for: painter
- Spouse: Julie Pearson-Little Thunder
- Website: merlinlittlethunder.com

Merlin Little Thunder is a Southern Cheyenne artist living in Tulsa, Oklahoma. His paintings express the history, people, and the land in a narrative, representational style, especially from the perspective of the Southern Cheyenne people. He is known for his miniature paintings, bright colors, and for the incorporation of humor into his work.

== Early life ==
Born in Clinton, Oklahoma, at the Clinton Indian Hospital, Little Thunder was raised in the town of Canton, Oklahoma, in the Southern Cheyenne community of Fonda. His great-grandfather, Frank Old Bear, performed with the Miller 101 Ranch Wild West Show. His uncle, Raymond Williams, was an amateur artist who could look at something once and then reproduce it but never turned his talent into a career. Little Thunder described growing up in Canton as "an Indian kid's paradise."

=== Education ===
Little Thunder's parents were George and Connie Little Thunder. Merlin went to Longdale Elementary and then moved to Okmulgee, OK and went to Lee School while his father, George, attended Okmulgee Tech on the GI Bill. After his father finished school the family eventually moved to Enid, OK and Little Thunder attended Adams and then Harrison Elementary. Eventually, his family moved back to Canton and Little Thunder returned to Longdale through the eighth grade and then graduated from Canton High School in 1975. After graduation from high school, Little Thunder began taking classes at Southwestern Oklahoma State College (SWOSU) in 1975, while majoring in pre-pharmacy. Little Thunder transferred to Bacone College in Muskogee, Oklahoma in 1976 because he wanted a smaller setting, still majoring in pre-pharmacy. When he transferred to Eastern Oklahoma State College in Wilburton, Oklahoma, he changed his major to art. He left college in 1980 for factory work. Later Little Thunder moved to Tulsa and met Jim Hewlett, a collector of Indian art, who bought drawings and paintings from Little Thunder and gave him space to work.

=== Personal life ===
After graduating from high school in Canton, Oklahoma, Merlin attended several colleges and universities to major in other subjects, yet he continued to learn art on the side. The young man married before graduating with a degree, quit college, and began working in a factory. His father opposed his desire to become a full-time artist because he feared his soon would be unable to support himself, let alone a family. But by 1981, Merlin and his first wife had divorced, and Merlin moved to Tulsa, where he became more deeply involved in his art.

Little Thunder indicates that demand for his artwork became so strong that he gave up factory work and became a full-time artist about 1981. He met the owner of an Oklahoma art gallery, Julie Pearson, whom he soon married.

== Collections ==
Little Thunder is best known for his miniature work. These are finely detailed, though they are physically tiny, as small as 1¼ by 2½ inches. He describes his art as coming from a spiritual experience which spurred his drawing and focuses on Cheyenne subject matter painted largely from memory. Humor is very important in Little Thunder's work and likes his work to "poke fun at history." Little Thunder is known for landscapes with 19th century Cheyenne subjects. He is also known for medicine paintings which he describes as more spiritual in nature and without artistic limitations. He has developed a reputation for his 1950s period work inspired by his great grandfather’s experiences riding in cattle drives and performing with the 101 Ranch show. Little Thunder's artwork can be seen in the collections of the Fred Jones Jr. Museum of Art, the Sam Noble Oklahoma Museum of Natural History, the National Cowboy and Western Heritage Museum, and the Museum of the American Indian.

=== Notable artworks ===
The following is a list of a few of Little Thunder's more prominent works of art:

- "Tornado warning at 3 a.m." depicts his grandmother, Daisy Little Thunder, and her family rushing into a cellar to escape a tornado
- "Keeping an eye on the defense secretary" which depicts a humorous, fictional event inspired by press reports of Defense Secretary Nominee John Tower’s drinking problem. Three Indian scouts are watching a man floating downriver in canoe with a brown jug
- "A pillory can out preach a parson" 1990 features a Cheyenne man and a Huichol Indian man who have been put into the stocks for drinking
- "The Time Queen Ann Got Ditched Around Hog Creek" depicting two Indians intently discussing a Queen Anne chest of drawers.

== Awards ==
Little Thunder has won numerous First Places in miniature and in water-based painting at the Trail of Tears Art Show and at Santa Fe Indian Market. He was awarded the Moscelyn Larkin Cultural Award from the Tulsa Commission on Indian Affairs in 2010. He has shown with the Tulsa Indian Art Festival since the 1990s. and was named Honored One at the 2015 Red Earth Indian Arts Festival.
