= Blackburn's Station =

Overland Mail stagecoach stop in Oklahoma

- Blackburn's Station Site
- U.S. National Register of Historic Places
- Location within Oklahoma Location within the United States
- Nearest city: Pittsburg, Oklahoma
- Coordinates: 34°41′5″N 95°44′39″W
- Area: 5 acres (2.0 ha)
- Built: 1861
- NRHP reference No.: 73001568
- Added to NRHP: March 7, 1973

Blackburn's Station was a stage stand on the old Butterfield Overland Mail route in Indian Territory. It was located in what is now Pittsburg County, Oklahoma. The station was named for Casper B. Blackburn, an inter-married Choctaw and trader.

Blackburn's Station was added to the National Register of Historic Places (#73001568) in 1973.

== Sources ==
- Shirk, George H. Oklahoma Place Names. Norman: University of Oklahoma Press, 1987: ISBN 0-8061-2028-2 .
- Wright, Murial H.; George H. Shirk; Kenny A. Franks. Mark of Heritage. Oklahoma City: Oklahoma Historical Society, 1976.
- Wright, Muriel H. "The Butterfield Overland Mail One Hundred Years Ago", Chronicles of Oklahoma 35:1 (January 1957) 55-71 (accessed August 21, 2006).

Butterfield Overland Mail in Indian Territory
Next station West; Waddell's Station	16 miles	Blackburn's Station	17 miles	Next station East; Pusley's Station
