= Butterfield Overland Mail in Indian Territory =

The Butterfield Overland Mail in Indian Territory was part of the overall Butterfield Overland Mail service (1857–1861) created by Congress March 3, 1857. The route crossed Indian Territory from Colbert's Ferry to Fort Smith, Arkansas which was the Center for the Overland Mail's' 7th Division. Fort Smith was also the junction point of the south bound coaches with the Memphis mail and its passengers. From Fort Smith the 7th Division route crossed the Poteau River into Indian Territory into the Choctaw Nation at Skullyville and left the Chickasaw Nation at Colbert's Ferry into Texas. There were 12 stage stations in Indian Territory, located from 13 to monkey pox 19 miles (31 km) apart. The total length of the route across the territory was approximately 197 miles (317 km). The Butterfield route met with the Texas Road near Geary's Station and followed it southward to the Red River.

Although it lasted only from 1857 to 1861, the Butterfield route made famous one of the most important roads in the settlement and development of early Oklahoma and was used until shortly before statehood in 1907. The route followed an old Indian trail out of the military's Fort Smith and was used by the Chickasaws during their settlement west in 1837. Following the Civil War, the Choctaw Council, to improve their economic interests, built bridges and turnpikes and maintained stage stands along their portion of the route.

== Stations ==
Each of the Indiana Territory stations in Oklahoma were in Division 7

- Fort Smith - Division Center of this section of the Butterfield Overland Mail
- Walker's Station - Located in what is now LeFlore County, it was named for Tandy Walker, a Choctaw chief.
- Trahern's Station - Located in what is now Leflore County, it was named for James N. Trahern, merchant and stage agent.
- Holloway's Station - Located in what is now Latimer County, it was named for the stage agent, William Holloway.
- Riddle's Station - Located in what is now Latimer County, it was named for trader John Riddle.
- Pusley's Station - Located in what is now Latimer County, it was named for trader Silas Pusley.
- Blackburn's Station - Located in what is now Pittsburg County, it was named for Casper B. Blackburn, local trader.
- Waddell's Station - Located in what is now Atoka County.
- Geary's Station - Located in what is now Atoka County, it was named for A.W. Geary, operator of the toll-bridge.
- Boggy Depot - Located on Boggy Creek in what is now Atoka County (in Boggy Depot State Park). It was named for the creek.
- Nail's Station - Located in what is now Bryan County, it was named for Joel H. Nail, the station operator.
- Fisher's Station - It was located in what is now Bryan County.
- Colbert's Station & Ferry - Located in what is now Bryan County, it was named for Benjamin F. Colbert, a prominent Chickasaw tribal leader and operator of the ferry. In addition, the ferry was important Red River crossing for the Texas Road and portal between the Indian Nations and Texas.

== Sources ==
- Foreman, Grant. "The California Overland Mail Route Through Oklahoma", Chronicles of Oklahoma 9:3 (September 1931) 300-317 (accessed August 16, 2006).
- Wright, Muriel H. "Historic Places on the Old Stage Line from Fort Smith to Red River", Chronicles of Oklahoma 11:2 (June 1933) 798-822 (accessed August 16, 2006).
- Wright, Muriel H. "The Butterfield Overland Mail One Hundred Years Ago", Chronicles of Oklahoma 35:1 (January 1957) (accessed August 16, 2006).

== See also ==
- Butterfield Overland Mail
- Butterfield Overland Mail in California
  - Butterfield Overland Mail in Baja California
- Butterfield Overland Mail in New Mexico Territory
- Butterfield Overland Mail in Texas
- Butterfield Overland Mail in Arkansas and Missouri

Butterfield Overland Mail in Indian Territory
Westernmost Station; Colbert's Ferry	Indian Territory	Easternmost Station; Walker's Station
