= Gowen, Oklahoma =

- Census-designated place
- Location within Oklahoma Location within the United States
- Coordinates: 34°52′53″N 95°28′37″W
- Country: United States
- State: Oklahoma
- County: Latimer

Area
  - Total: 3.54 sq mi (9.17 km^{2})
  - Land: 3.53 sq mi (9.15 km^{2})
  - Water: 0.0077 sq mi (0.02 km^{2})
- Elevation: 722 ft (220 m)

Population (2020)
  - Total: 244
  - Density: 69.1/sq mi (26.68/km^{2})
- Time zone: UTC-6 (Central (CST))
  - Summer (DST): UTC-5 (CDT)
- ZIP code: 74545
- Area codes: 918 & 539
- GNIS feature ID: 1093278
- FIPS code: 40-30500

Gowen is an unincorporated community and census-designated place (CDP) in Latimer County, Oklahoma, United States. The community is located to the south of U.S. Route 270 and 10 miles (16 km) west-southwest of Wilburton. Gowen has a post office with ZIP code 74545. The post office at Gowen, Indian Territory opened on January 13, 1894. The community was named for lawyer Francis I. Gowen. At the time of its founding, Gowen was located in the Moshulatubbee District of the Choctaw Nation.

The population as of the 2020 Census was 244. The Census Bureau defined a census-designated place (CDP) for Gowen in 2015; the 2010 population within the 2015 CDP boundary was 244 and contained 118 housing units.

== Demographics ==
Historical population
Census	Pop.	Note	%±
2020	244		—
U.S. Decennial Census

=== 2020 census ===
As of the 2020 census, Gowen had a population of 244. The median age was 38.7 years. 29.1% of residents were under the age of 18 and 20.1% of residents were 65 years of age or older. For every 100 females there were 119.8 males, and for every 100 females age 18 and over there were 170.3 males age 18 and over.

0.0% of residents lived in urban areas, while 100.0% lived in rural areas.

There were 95 households in Gowen, of which 21.1% had children under the age of 18 living in them. Of all households, 34.7% were married-couple households, 29.5% were households with a male householder and no spouse or partner present, and 28.4% were households with a female householder and no spouse or partner present. About 46.3% of all households were made up of individuals and 15.8% had someone living alone who was 65 years of age or older.

There were 105 housing units, of which 9.5% were vacant. The homeowner vacancy rate was 0.0% and the rental vacancy rate was 12.5%.

Racial composition as of the 2020 census
Race	Number	Percent
White	166	68.0%
Black or African American	0	0.0%
American Indian and Alaska Native	44	18.0%
Asian	1	0.4%
Native Hawaiian and Other Pacific Islander	0	0.0%
Some other race	1	0.4%
Two or more races	32	13.1%
Hispanic or Latino (of any race)	10	4.1%
