= Fanshawe, Oklahoma =

- Town
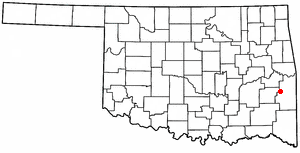
- Location of Fanshawe, Oklahoma
- Coordinates: 34°58′25″N 94°49′19″W
- Country: United States
- State: Oklahoma
- Counties: Latimer, Le Flore

Area
  - Total: 23.07 sq mi (59.74 km^{2})
  - Land: 22.97 sq mi (59.49 km^{2})
  - Water: 0.097 sq mi (0.25 km^{2})
- Elevation: 732 ft (223 m)

Population (2020)
  - Total: 317
  - Density: 13.8/sq mi (5.33/km^{2})
- Time zone: UTC-6 (Central (CST))
  - Summer (DST): UTC-5 (CDT)
- ZIP code: 74935
- Area codes: 539/918
- FIPS code: 40-25400
- GNIS feature ID: 2412620

Fanshawe is a town in Latimer and Le Flore counties in the U.S. state of Oklahoma. As of the 2020 Census, the town had a total population of 317.

== History ==
A post office was established at Fanshawe, Indian Territory on March 31, 1891. The town was named after John R. Fanshawe, an employee of the Choctaw, Oklahoma and Gulf Railroad, which built through the area in 1889–90; however, the town had no role in choosing the name. Railroad executives and investors made an inspection trip on the newly built line; at each designated station a name was drawn from a hat, and that name was used to designate the new town. At the time of its founding, Fanshawe was located in the Moshulatubbee District of the Choctaw Nation.

== Geography ==
According to the United States Census Bureau, the town has a total area of 22.7 square miles (58.8 km^{2}), of which 22.6 square miles (58.5 km^{2}) is land and 0.1 square mile (0.3 km^{2}) (0.57%) is water.

== Demographics ==
Historical population
Census	Pop.	Note	%±
1970	199		—
1980	416		109.0%
1990	331		−20.4%
2000	384		16.0%
2010	419		9.1%
2020	317		−24.3%
U.S. Decennial Census

=== 2020 census ===
As of the 2020 census, Fanshawe had a population of 317. The median age was 39.6 years. 30.0% of residents were under the age of 18 and 19.2% of residents were 65 years of age or older. For every 100 females there were 101.9 males, and for every 100 females age 18 and over there were 105.6 males age 18 and over.

0.0% of residents lived in urban areas, while 100.0% lived in rural areas.

There were 126 households in Fanshawe, of which 39.7% had children under the age of 18 living in them. Of all households, 45.2% were married-couple households, 24.6% were households with a male householder and no spouse or partner present, and 27.0% were households with a female householder and no spouse or partner present. About 31.0% of all households were made up of individuals and 15.0% had someone living alone who was 65 years of age or older.

There were 141 housing units, of which 10.6% were vacant. The homeowner vacancy rate was 1.0% and the rental vacancy rate was 0.0%.

Racial composition as of the 2020 census
Race	Number	Percent
White	217	68.5%
Black or African American	1	0.3%
American Indian and Alaska Native	66	20.8%
Asian	8	2.5%
Native Hawaiian and Other Pacific Islander	0	0.0%
Some other race	1	0.3%
Two or more races	24	7.6%
Hispanic or Latino (of any race)	10	3.2%

=== 2000 census ===
As of the census of 2000, there were 384 people, 146 households, and 102 families residing in the town. The population density was 17.0 inhabitants per square mile (6.6/km^{2}). There were 168 housing units at an average density of 7.4 per square mile (2.9/km^{2}). The racial makeup of the town was 78.65% White, 17.97% Native American, 0.78% Asian, and 2.60% from two or more races. Hispanic or Latino of any race were 1.82% of the population.

There were 146 households, out of which 35.6% had children under the age of 18 living with them, 63.0% were married couples living together, 3.4% had a female householder with no husband present, and 30.1% were non-families. 28.1% of all households were made up of individuals, and 17.1% had someone living alone who was 65 years of age or older. The average household size was 2.63 and the average family size was 3.23.

In the town, the population was spread out, with 28.4% under the age of 18, 6.5% from 18 to 24, 26.6% from 25 to 44, 24.7% from 45 to 64, and 13.8% who were 65 years of age or older. The median age was 37 years. For every 100 females, there were 107.6 males. For every 100 females age 18 and over, there were 108.3 males.

The median income for a household in the town was $21,875, and the median income for a family was $30,000. Males had a median income of $29,286 versus $23,125 for females. The per capita income for the town was $20,583. About 26.3% of families and 29.2% of the population were below the poverty line, including 34.6% of those under age 18 and 16.2% of those age 65 or over.
