= Geary's Station =

Overland Mail stagecoach stop in Oklahoma

Coordinates: 34.4558°N 96.0892°W

Geary's Station was a stage stand on the old Butterfield Overland Mail route in Indian Territory. Sometimes called Geary's Crossing, it was located on the east side of Little Boggy Creek (North Boggy Creek) in what is now Atoka County, Oklahoma. It was operated by A.W. Geary, an inter-married Choctaw. His wife Lucy was the sister of a Choctaw chief. The Choctaw Nation had awarded Geary the privilege of building a bridge and tollgate at the Little Boggy crossing on the Fort Smith-Boggy Depot Road in 1858, which later became the route of the Butterfield Overland Mail stage.

Geary's Station is listed by the Oklahoma Historical Society as an Oklahoma Historic Site. The actual site has been inundated by the Atoka Reservoir.

== Sources ==
- Shirk, George H. Oklahoma Place Names. Norman: University of Oklahoma Press, 1987: ISBN 0-8061-2028-2 .
- Wright, Murial H.; George H. Shirk; Kenny A. Franks. Mark of Heritage. Oklahoma City: Oklahoma Historical Society, 1976.
- Wright, Muriel H. "The Butterfield Overland Mail One Hundred Years Ago", Chronicles of Oklahoma 35:1 (January 1957) 55-71 (accessed August 19, 2006).

Butterfield Overland Mail in Indian Territory
Next station West; Boggy Depot	16 miles	Geary's Station	15 miles	Next station East; Waddell's Station
