= Waddell's Station =

Overland Mail stagecoach stop in Oklahoma

- Waddell's Station Site
- U.S. National Register of Historic Places
- Location within Oklahoma Location within the United States
- Nearest city: Wesley, Oklahoma
- Coordinates: 34°34′1″N 95°56′2″W
- Area: 1 acre (0.40 ha)
- Built: 1858
- NRHP reference No.: 72001054
- Added to NRHP: April 13, 1972

Waddell's Station was a stage stand on the old Butterfield Overland Mail route in Indian Territory. It was located in what is now Atoka County, Oklahoma. It is sometimes confused with Roger's Station, a post-Civil War stage stand and post office, which was three miles (5 km) in an easterly direction from Waddell's.

Waddell's Station was added to the National Register of Historic Places (#72001054) in 1972.

== Sources ==
- Shirk, George H. Oklahoma Place Names. Norman: University of Oklahoma Press, 1987: ISBN 0-8061-2028-2 .
- Wright, Murial H.; George H. Shirk; Kenny A. Franks. Mark of Heritage. Oklahoma City: Oklahoma Historical Society, 1976
- Wright, Muriel H. "The Butterfield Overland Mail One Hundred Years Ago", Chronicles of Oklahoma 35:1 (January 1957) 55-71 (accessed August 19, 2006).

Butterfield Overland Mail in Indian Territory
Next station West; Geary's Station	15 miles	Waddell's Station	16 miles	Next station East; Blackburn's Station
