= Robbers Cave State Park =

State park in Oklahoma, United States

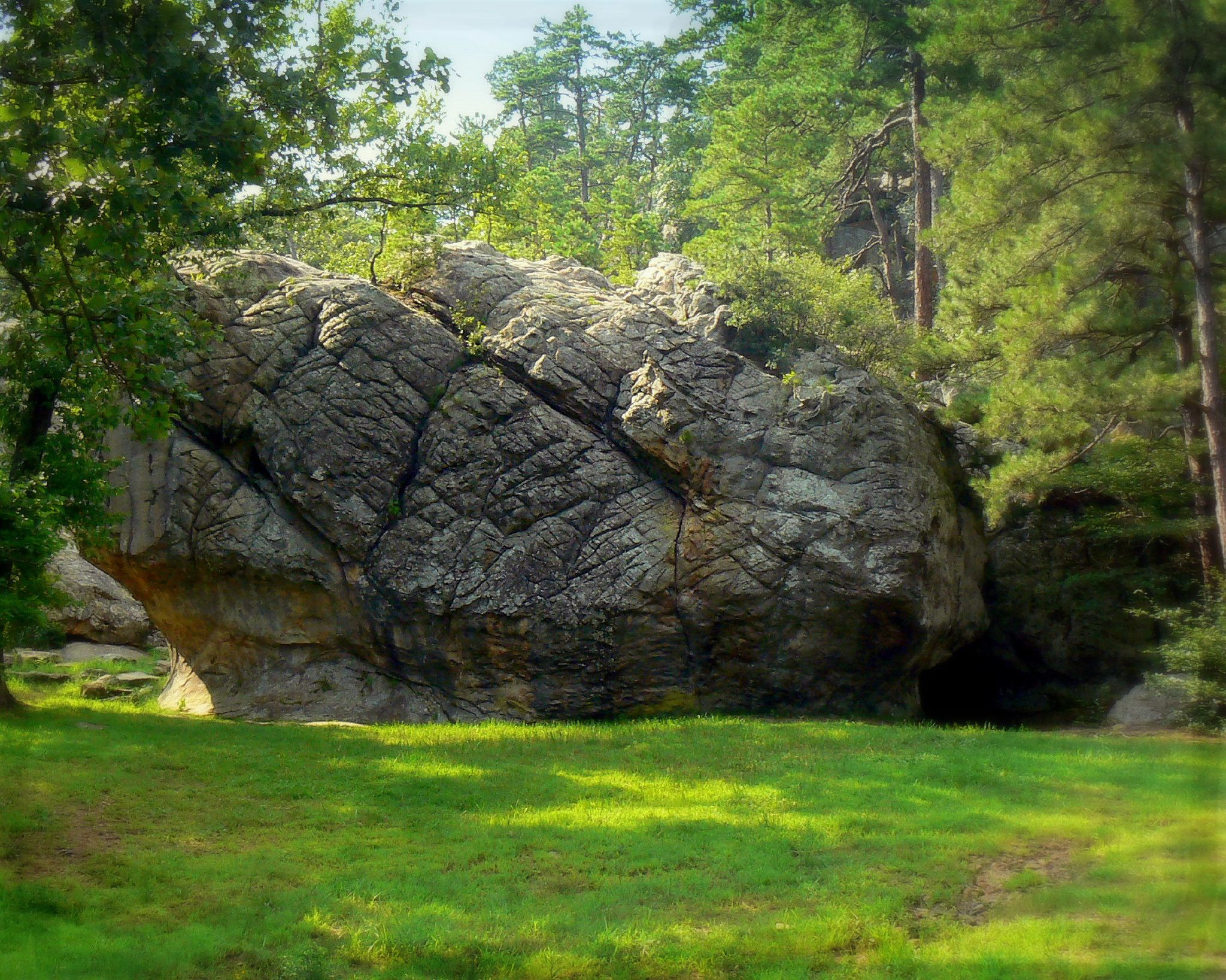
- Hiking Trailhead at Robbers Cave State Park

- Location within Oklahoma
- Location: Latimer County, Oklahoma, United States
- Nearest city: Wilburton, Oklahoma
- Coordinates: 35°00′10″N 95°20′29″W
- Area: 12.8844 square miles (33.370 km^{2})
- Established: 1929
- Visitors: 983,131 (in 2021)
- Governing body: Oklahoma Department of Tourism and Recreation
- Website: www.travelok.com/listings/view.profile/id.6415

Robbers Cave State Park is a state park in Latimer County, Oklahoma. It is located 5 miles (8.0 km) north of Wilburton, Oklahoma, on Oklahoma State Highway 2. Originally named Latimer State Park, it received its current name in 1936. It is located in the scenic, hilly woodlands of the Sans Bois Mountains of southeast Oklahoma. This park is a favorite of rappellers, equestrians, hikers and outdoor lovers. The park and adjoining wildlife management area covers more than 8,000 acres (3,200 ha) and includes three lakes. It offers visitors acres of discovery and enjoyment including trout fishing in season, boating, hunting, mountain biking, trails for hikers and horses, sandstone cliffs for climbing and rappelling, and fall foliage viewing. In addition, Robbers Cave is historically notable as a former hideout for infamous outlaws Belle Starr and Jesse James.

== History ==
The area surrounding the present-day park has been a hunting ground for hundreds of years. Archaeological evidence suggests that the earliest people were related to the builders of the Spiro Mounds. By the 1600s, the Osage and Caddo tribes dominated the area. French hunters and explorers also visited, leaving their mark by naming some of the prominent geographic features, which are still used.

In 1850 the area of Robbers Cave was assigned to the newly established Sans Bois County, a part of the Moshulatubbee District of the Choctaw Nation.

After the Civil War, this area became legendary for sheltering fugitives from the law. Some of these included Jesse James and Belle Starr. Other fugitives included the Dalton Gang, the Youngers and the Rufus Buck Gang.

In 1929, Carlton Weaver, an editor and politician from Wilburton, donated 120 acres of land near Robbers Cave to the Boy Scouts of America for a campground. The warden of the Oklahoma State Penitentiary arranged for skilled prison inmates to construct camp improvements, including a kitchen and several other buildings, from rock quarried nearby. The new facility was named Camp Tom Hale, for a McAlester resident and Boy Scout supporter. The camp was adjacent to a tract of land that Weaver had leased to create a game preserve. Weaver later donated the preserve to the Oklahoma Fish and Game Commission.

The Civilian Conservation Corps (CCC) was organized in 1933. Supervised by the National Park Service, the CCC built a bathhouse, cabins, trails, group camps, shelters, and roads. In 1937, CCC and the Works Progress Administration (WPA) created Lake Carlton, named for Carlton Weaver.

In 1954, a social psychological experiment involving 22 teenager boys was conducted in the State Park. Its results paved way to the formulation of realistic conflict theory.

In 1987, the park initiated the first annual Robbers Cave Fall Festival, and the Robbers Cave Bluegrass Festival began in 1988. In 1994, Oklahoma converted the bathhouse to a nature center. The park was added to the National Register of Historic Places (NR 96000489) in 2002.

== Park facilities ==
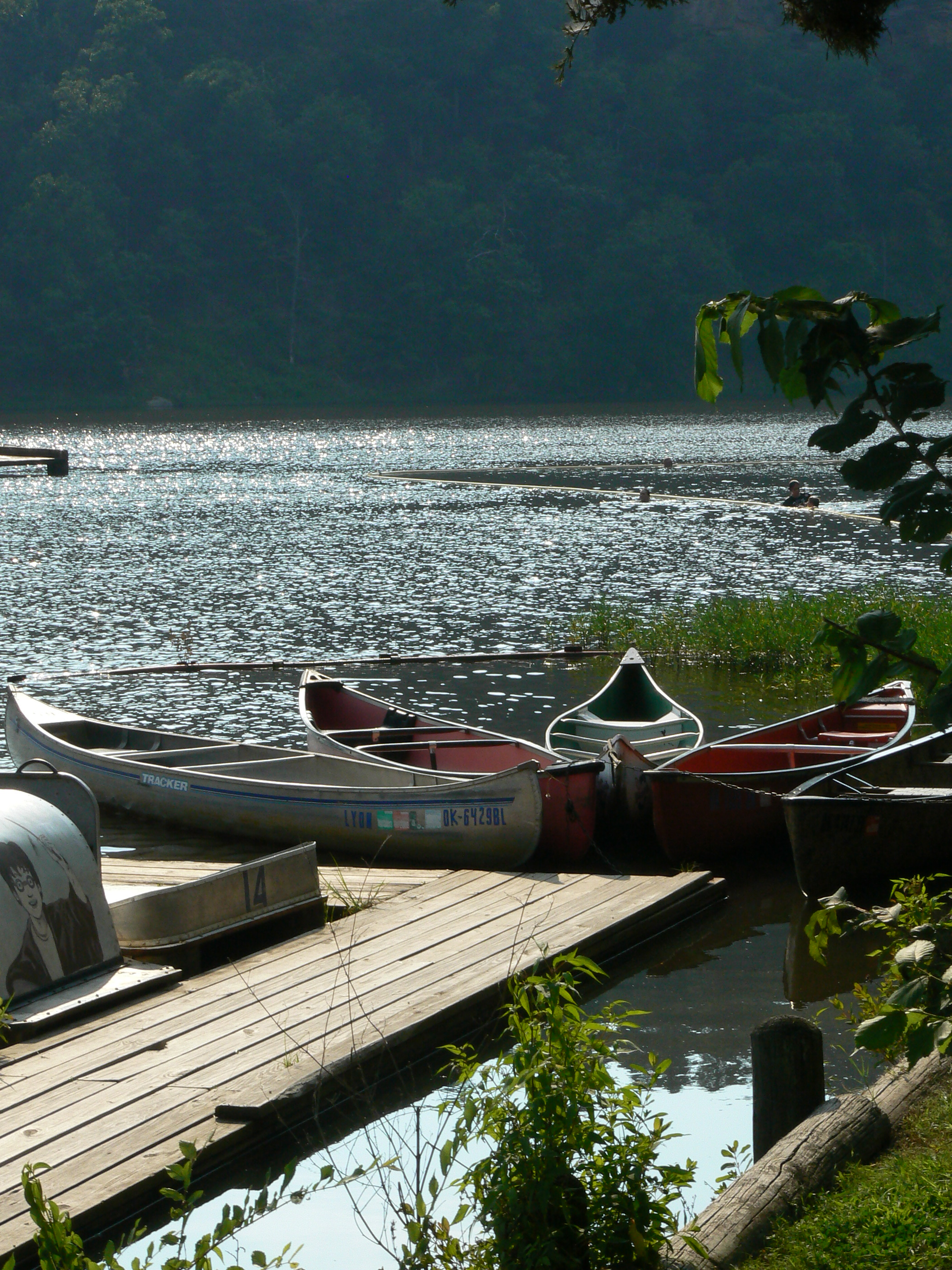
Canoe rental facility on Lake Carlton in July 2007.

The park encompasses three lakes: Lake Carlton, Lake Wayne Wallace and Coon Creek Lake. These were created by dams built on Fourche Maline Creek, a tributary of Poteau River. The combined surface area of the three lakes is 189 acres (76 ha).

RV sites, tent sites and equestrian campsites are available and lodging facilities at Robbers Cave State Park include the Belle Starr View Lodge, several cabins and two group camps. Leashed pets are allowed in the park and in some cabins. Picnic tables, comfort stations with showers, boat ramps, a swimming beach, swimming pool with bathhouse, playgrounds, miniature golf, hiking trails, horseback riding stables, paddle boat rentals, small grocery store, on-site restaurant, and a nature center with naturalist programs and exhibits round out the park's facilities. Two tennis courts, a basketball court and a walking track are also available a few miles from the park. Several miles of trails are scattered throughout the park. Horses can be rented to follow the trails. One of the trails is northwest of the cave area and travels around Lost Lake.

The Boy Scout camp within the park was the site of Muzafer Sherif's Robber's Cave study on realistic conflict theory.

== Fees ==
To help fund a backlog of deferred maintenance and park improvements, the state implemented an entrance fee for this park and 21 others effective June 15, 2020. The fees, charged per vehicle, start at $10 per day for a single-day or $8 for residents with an Oklahoma license plate or Oklahoma tribal plate. Fees are waived for honorably discharged veterans and Oklahoma residents age 62 and older and their spouses. Passes good for three days or a week are also available; annual passes good at all 22 state parks charging fees are offered at a cost of $75 for out-of-state visitors or $60 for Oklahoma residents. The 22 parks are:

- Arrowhead Area at Lake Eufaula State Park
- Beavers Bend State Park
- Boiling Springs State Park
- Cherokee Landing State Park
- Fort Cobb State Park
- Foss State Park
- Honey Creek Area at Grand Lake State Park
- Great Plains State Park
- Great Salt Plains State Park
- Greenleaf State Park
- Keystone State Park
- Lake Eufaula State Park
- Lake Murray State Park
- Lake Texoma State Park
- Lake Thunderbird State Park
- Lake Wister State Park
- Natural Falls State Park
- Osage Hills State Park
- Robbers Cave State Park
- Sequoyah State Park
- Tenkiller State Park
- Twin Bridges Area at Grand Lake State Park
