= Panola, Oklahoma =

- Census-designated place
- Location within Oklahoma Location within the United States
- Coordinates: 34°55′43″N 95°12′48″W
- Country: United States
- State: Oklahoma
- County: Latimer

Area
  - Total: 1.13 sq mi (2.92 km^{2})
  - Land: 1.12 sq mi (2.90 km^{2})
  - Water: 0.0077 sq mi (0.02 km^{2})
- Elevation: 642 ft (196 m)

Population (2020)
  - Total: 73
  - Density: 65.1/sq mi (25.13/km^{2})
- Time zone: UTC-6 (Central (CST))
  - Summer (DST): UTC-5 (CDT)
- FIPS code: 40-56950
- GNIS feature ID: 1096396

Panola is a small unincorporated community and census-designated place in Latimer County, Oklahoma, United States. The post office was established March 18, 1911. Panola is the Choctaw name for cotton. The high school and gymnasium are on the National Register of Historic Places. The population was 73 at the time of the 2020 Census.

== Demographics ==
Historical population
Census	Pop.	Note	%±
2020	73		—
U.S. Decennial Census

=== 2020 census ===
As of the 2020 census, Panola had a population of 73. The median age was 40.5 years. 27.4% of residents were under the age of 18 and 24.7% of residents were 65 years of age or older. For every 100 females there were 69.8 males, and for every 100 females age 18 and over there were 103.8 males age 18 and over.

0.0% of residents lived in urban areas, while 100.0% lived in rural areas.

There were 35 households in Panola, of which 11.4% had children under the age of 18 living in them. Of all households, 20.0% were married-couple households, 37.1% were households with a male householder and no spouse or partner present, and 42.9% were households with a female householder and no spouse or partner present. About 77.2% of all households were made up of individuals and 71.5% had someone living alone who was 65 years of age or older.

There were 40 housing units, of which 12.5% were vacant. The homeowner vacancy rate was 2.8% and the rental vacancy rate was 0.0%.

Racial composition as of the 2020 census
Race	Number	Percent
White	50	68.5%
Black or African American	0	0.0%
American Indian and Alaska Native	20	27.4%
Asian	0	0.0%
Native Hawaiian and Other Pacific Islander	0	0.0%
Some other race	0	0.0%
Two or more races	3	4.1%
Hispanic or Latino (of any race)	2	2.7%
