= Riddle's Station =

Overland Mail stagecoach stop in Oklahoma

- Riddle's Station Site
- U.S. National Register of Historic Places
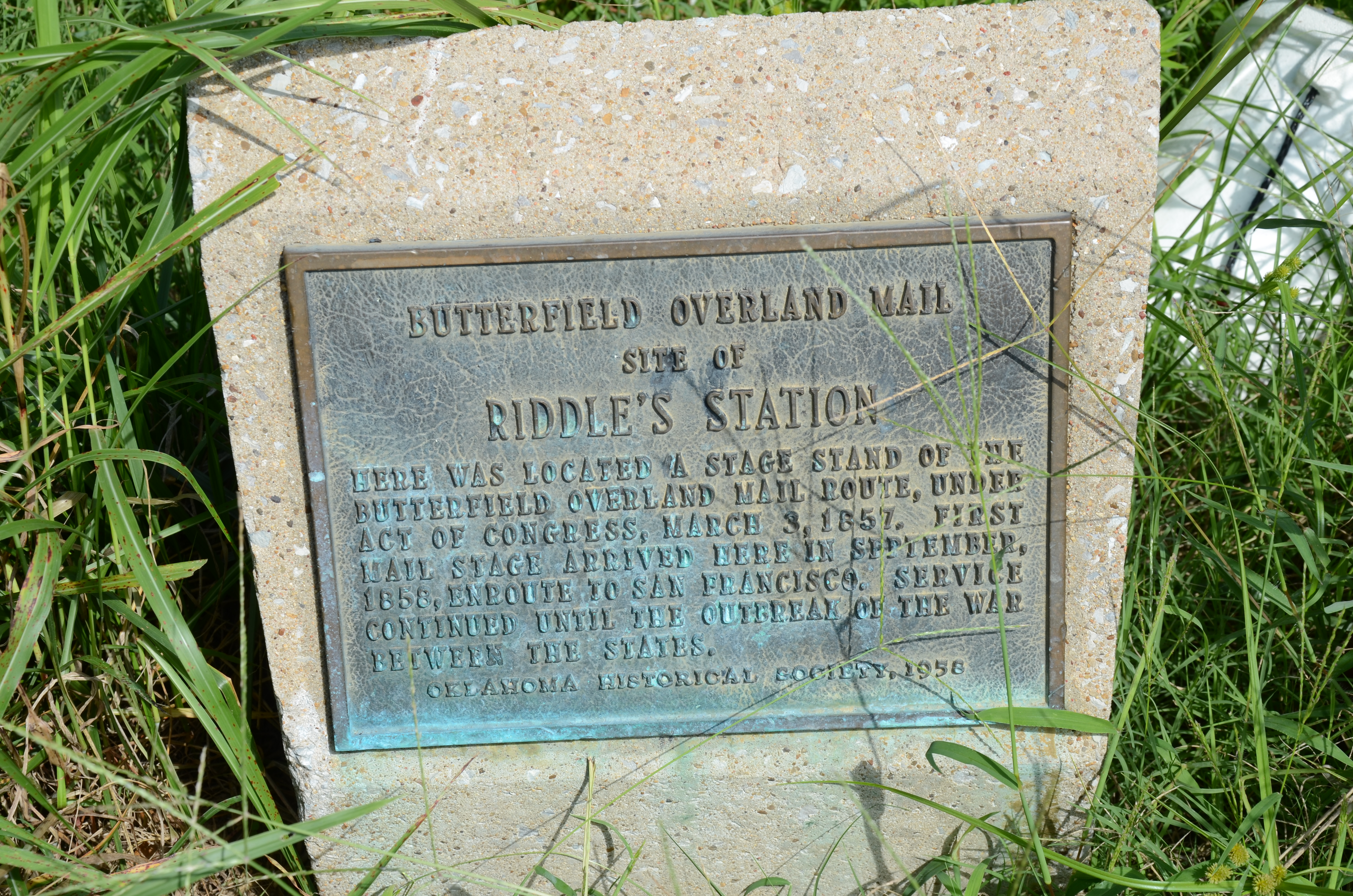

- Location within Oklahoma
- Nearest city: Wilburton, Oklahoma
- Coordinates: 34°55′13.9″N 95°15′24.13″W
- Area: 3 acres (1.2 ha)
- Built: 1858
- NRHP reference No.: 72001072
- Added to NRHP: June 13, 1972

Riddle's Station was a stage stand on the old Butterfield Overland Mail route in Indian Territory. It was located on the west side of the Forche Maline in what is now Latimer County. The station was named for Captain John Riddle, the operator. Riddle was a mixed-blood Choctaw and a prominent member of the Nation. He served many terms on the Choctaw Council. In 1858, the Council granted Riddle the right to build a bridge and tollbooth across the Forche Maline near his station.

Riddle's Station was added to the National Register of Historic Places in 1972.

"Riddle's Station is one of the more important of the even dozen such stands serving the Butterfield Overland Mail 1858-1861 along its 192-mile route across Indian Territory from Fort Smith to Colbert's Ferry on Red River. Unlike some of the other stands, however, it played a significant role in the development of the area for many years after the Civil War put an end to the service itself." The bridge there was asserted to be the first in the Butterfield route.

== Sources ==
- Shirk, George H. Oklahoma Place Names. Norman: University of Oklahoma Press, 1987: ISBN 0-8061-2028-2 .
- Wright, Murial H.; George H. Shirk; Kenny A. Franks. Mark of Heritage. Oklahoma City: Oklahoma Historical Society, 1976.
- Wright, Muriel H. "The Butterfield Overland Mail One Hundred Years Ago", Chronicles of Oklahoma 35:1 (January 1957) 55-71 (accessed August 23, 2006).

Butterfield Overland Mail in Indian Territory
Next station West; Pusley's Station	16 miles	Riddle's Station	18 miles	Next station East; Holloway's Station
