= Holloway's Station =

Overland Mail stagecoach stop in Oklahoma

- U.S. National Register of Historic Places
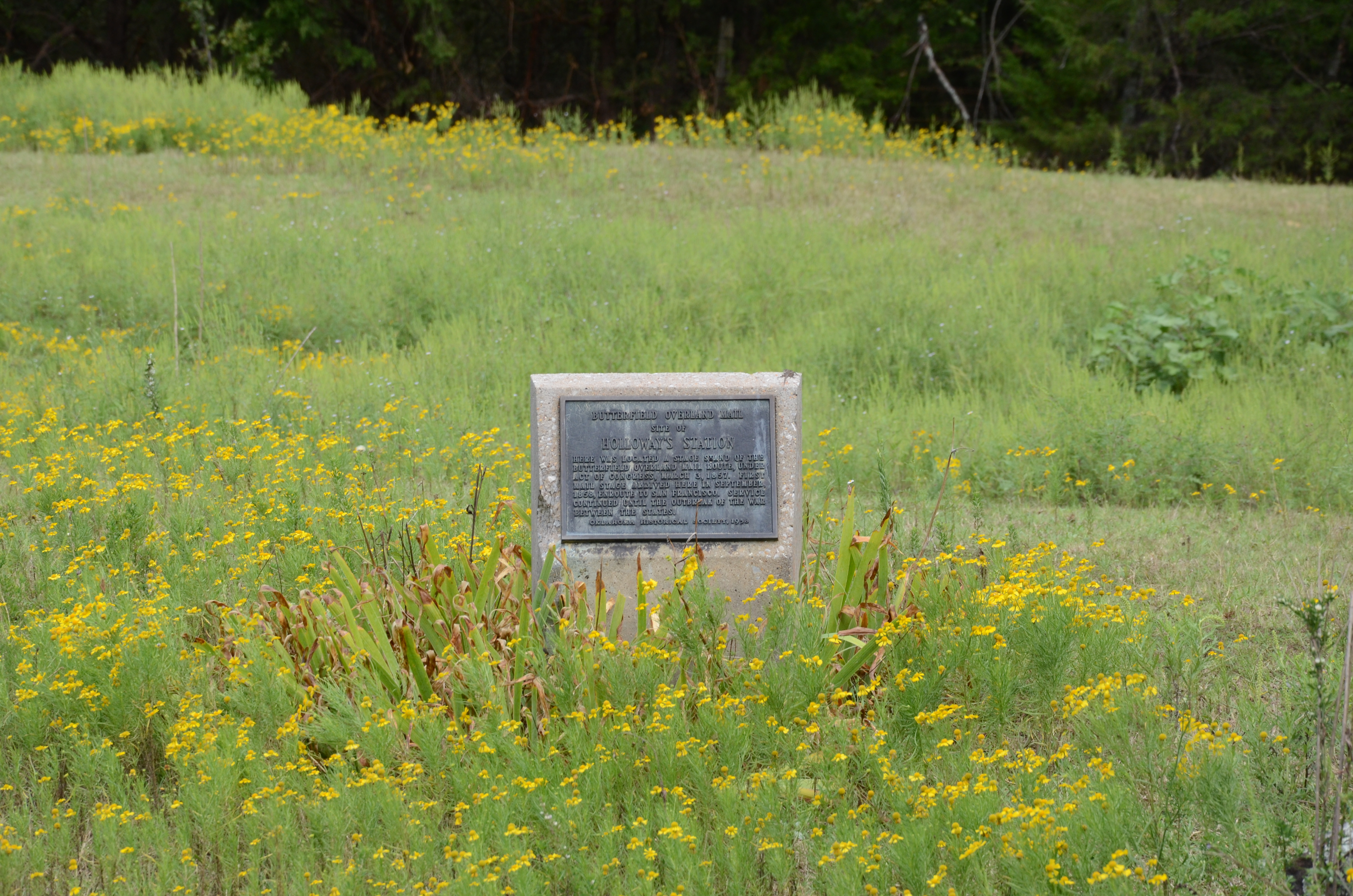

- Location within Oklahoma Location within the United States
- Nearest city: Red Oak, Oklahoma
- Coordinates: 34°58′38.91″N 95°2′54.04″W
- Built: 1858
- NRHP reference No.: 72001070
- Added to NRHP: April 13, 1972

Holloway's Station, or The Narrows, was a stage stand on the old Butterfield Overland Mail route in Indian Territory. It was located near "The Narrows" at upper Brazil Creek in what is now Latimer County, Oklahoma. The station was named for William Holloway, the stage agent. In 1858, the Choctaw Council granted Holloway the right to construct a turnpike and tollbooth at "The Narrows". Holloway left after Butterfield discontinued service in 1861.

Holloway's Station was added to the National Register of Historic Places in 1972.

Most evidence of the station was gone by 1971. A cemetery with a few stones remained, the most prominent being for an 1875 burial. "The Holloway's site is immediately across the road, to the northwest of the cemetery. Though altered by road construction, it is an attractive spot, a small clearing on a timbered flat between the south bank of Brazil Creek and the northern entrance to "The Narrows." As recently as 1930 there remained a few scattered foundation stones and some evidence of a well to locate the site. Now only the cemetery stones are left and — if one looks closely — portions of the old Butterfield road grade as it climbed rather sharply out of the narrows. The gradient of the present county road is much less than that of the Butterfield road, and in its construction it cut through and/or filled up sections of the old stage trail. But traces of it can still be found to suggest what stage travel on the frontier was like more than a hundred years ago."

It is located about .5 miles (0.80 km) east of Red Oak, Oklahoma.

== Sources ==
- Shirk, George H. Oklahoma Place Names. Norman: University of Oklahoma Press, 1987: ISBN 0-8061-2028-2 .
- Wright, Murial H.; George H. Shirk; Kenny A. Franks. Mark of Heritage. Oklahoma City: Oklahoma Historical Society, 1976.
- Wright, Muriel H. "The Butterfield Overland Mail One Hundred Years Ago", Chronicles of Oklahoma 35:1 (January 1957) 55-71 (accessed August 23, 2006).

Butterfield Overland Mail in Indian Territory
Next station West; Riddle's Station	18 miles	Holloway's Station	19 miles	Next station East; Trahern's Station
