= Red Oak, Oklahoma =

Red Oak, Oklahoma Chishikta (Choctaw)
- Town
- Nickname: Tha Oak
- Motto: We are Red Oak
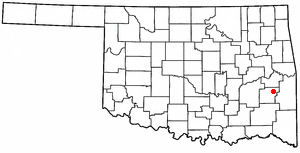
- Location of Red Oak, Oklahoma
- Coordinates: 34°57′6″N 95°4′51″W
- Country: United States
- State: Oklahoma
- County: Latimer

Area
  - Total: 1.18 sq mi (3.05 km^{2})
  - Land: 1.17 sq mi (3.03 km^{2})
  - Water: 0.0077 sq mi (0.02 km^{2})
- Elevation: 587 ft (179 m)

Population (2020)
  - Total: 537
  - Density: 458.8/sq mi (177.15/km^{2})
- Time zone: UTC-6 (Central (CST))
  - Summer (DST): UTC-5 (CDT)
- ZIP code: 74563
- Area codes: 539/918
- FIPS code: 40-62550
- GNIS feature ID: 1097108

Red Oak is a town in Latimer County, Oklahoma, United States. The population was 537 at the 2020 Census.

== History ==
The area around Red Oak has been inhabited since approximately 9,000 BCE, beginning with people of the Fourche Maline Culture who were descended from the first Native Americans to migrate from Asia via the Bering Land Bridge. Archaeological sites such as the McCutchan-McLaughlin site in southeastern Latimer County provide evidence of Fourche Maline settlements, particularly the burial mounds used by these people groups. The combination of poor health and prolonged drought led to the extinction of the Fourche Maline cultures by the early 15th century. European explorers, including Francisco Vasquez de Coronado and Jean Baptiste Bernard de la Harpe, began arriving in the mid-16th century and found only scattered remains of these once thriving cultures.

Red Oak became an area of settlement for members of the Choctaw tribe during relocation as part of the Trail of Tears beginning in the 1830s. In 1858, English immigrant Thomas Edwards married Choctaw native Nancy Hardaway and together they established Edwards Store on Hardaway's land on the Butterfield Overland Mail Route. Adhering to Choctaw tradition in naming sites after people or prominent features, the community that arose around their store became known as "Red Oak," after a large red oak tree in the area. Edwards Store became the first post office in Red Oak and was a successful merchantile for both the stage route and the growing community. At the time it was founded, Red Oak was located in the Moshulatubbee District of the Choctaw Nation.

The arrival of the Choctaw Coal and Railway (later the Choctaw, Oklahoma and Gulf Railroad, subsequently acquired by the Chicago, Rock Island and Pacific Railway) nine miles southwest of Edwards Store led to the relocation of the town to its present site. With close proximity to the railroad, Red Oak became a thriving and prosperous community in the early 20th century. Some of the business structures from this era are still in existence, including the Red Oak Library (formerly the post office) and the buildings lining the Main Street business district such as Rustic Customs, Eagle Ridge Camp Store, and Fields Hardware.

The earliest schools were located in homes prior to 1900, with the first high school built in 1909. In 1921, Red Oak High School relocated from a brick building on the south side of town to a native sandstone building on the far north end of town. The two-story, pentagonal building is listed on the Oklahoma Historic Register and was followed in 1938 by a new elementary school (now Alice Savage Elementary) built by workers of the Works Progress Administration. The building was also constructed of native sandstone and consisted of nine classrooms and an auditorium/gymnasium. This building was replaced in 1950 with the current high school building (W.B. Rutledge High School). All three buildings are still in use and were renovated in the early 21st century through a series of bond issues.

== Geography ==
Red Oak is located at 34°57′6″N 95°4′51″W (34.951669, −95.080890).

According to the United States Census Bureau, the town has a total area of 0.9 square miles (2.3 km^{2}), all land.

== Demographics ==
Historical population
Census	Pop.	Note	%±
1910	398		—
1920	593		49.0%
1930	460		−22.4%
1940	484		5.2%
1950	568		17.4%
1960	453		−20.2%
1970	609		34.4%
1980	676		11.0%
1990	602		−10.9%
2000	581		−3.5%
2010	549		−5.5%
2020	537		−2.2%
U.S. Decennial Census

=== 2020 census ===
As of the 2020 census, Red Oak had a population of 537. The median age was 40.5 years. 23.8% of residents were under the age of 18 and 22.3% of residents were 65 years of age or older. For every 100 females there were 104.2 males, and for every 100 females age 18 and over there were 87.6 males age 18 and over.

0.0% of residents lived in urban areas, while 100.0% lived in rural areas.

There were 232 households in Red Oak, of which 35.8% had children under the age of 18 living in them. Of all households, 40.9% were married-couple households, 22.0% were households with a male householder and no spouse or partner present, and 32.3% were households with a female householder and no spouse or partner present. About 32.8% of all households were made up of individuals and 15.5% had someone living alone who was 65 years of age or older.

There were 256 housing units, of which 9.4% were vacant. The homeowner vacancy rate was 1.2% and the rental vacancy rate was 9.3%.

Racial composition as of the 2020 census
Race	Number	Percent
White	306	57.0%
Black or African American	3	0.6%
American Indian and Alaska Native	185	34.5%
Asian	1	0.2%
Native Hawaiian and Other Pacific Islander	0	0.0%
Some other race	1	0.2%
Two or more races	41	7.6%
Hispanic or Latino (of any race)	16	3.0%

=== 2000 census ===
As of the census of 2000, there were 581 people, 239 households, and 155 families residing in the town. The population density was 618.7 inhabitants per square mile (238.9/km^{2}). There were 283 housing units at an average density of 301.4 per square mile (116.4/km^{2}). The racial makeup of the town was 70.57% White, 0.52% African American, 21.86% Native American, and 7.06% from two or more races. Hispanic or Latino of any race were 0.69% of the population.

There were 239 households, out of which 27.2% had children under the age of 18 living with them, 45.6% were married couples living together, 13.8% had a female householder with no husband present, and 35.1% were non-families. 32.6% of all households were made up of individuals, and 20.9% had someone living alone who was 65 years of age or older. The average household size was 2.43 and the average family size was 3.06.

In the town, the population was spread out, with 27.2% under the age of 18, 8.4% from 18 to 24, 23.9% from 25 to 44, 20.8% from 45 to 64, and 19.6% who were 65 years of age or older. The median age was 38 years. For every 100 females, there were 91.7 males. For every 100 females age 18 and over, there were 88.0 males.

The median income for a household in the town was $20,461, and the median income for a family was $25,625. Males had a median income of $27,188 versus $21,250 for females. The per capita income for the town was $11,270. About 22.8% of families and 25.5% of the population were below the poverty line, including 37.9% of those under age 18 and 15.1% of those age 65 or over.

== Education ==
Red Oak has one elementary, junior high, and one high school. Total enrollment in the 2018–2019 academic year was 314 students, an increase of almost 75 percent in the past decade. The high school was named one of America's Best High Schools in 2017 by U.S. News & World Report. The school is a one-to-one technology school and boasts programs in STEM, technology, 4-H, FCCLA, FFA, and art. KIBOIS also operates a Head Start program in Red Oak.

The high school athletic teams are renowned for their recent state championships: softball teams have won 14 state championships, baseball teams have won 11 championships, and boys' basketball teams have won three state championships. Red Oak school may often post their achievements on the Red Oak School's website https://www.redoak.k12.ok.us/. Other activities sanctioned by the Oklahoma Secondary Schools Activities Association include cross country and academic team. The archery team, affiliated with the OKNASP program, has won two state championships.

== Utilities ==
Telephone and Internet Services is provided by Hilliary Communications.

== Historic sites ==
(Main article: National Register of Historic Places listings in Latimer County, Oklahoma)

NRHP sites in and around Red Oak include Holloway's Station, Edwards Store, the Edwards-Hardaway Homestead and Cemetery, and the address-restricted McLaughlin Site.

== Notable people ==
- Lane Adams, Major League Baseball player
