= Sacred Heart Catholic Church and Rectory (Wilburton, Oklahoma) =

Historic church in Oklahoma, United States

- U.S. National Register of Historic Places
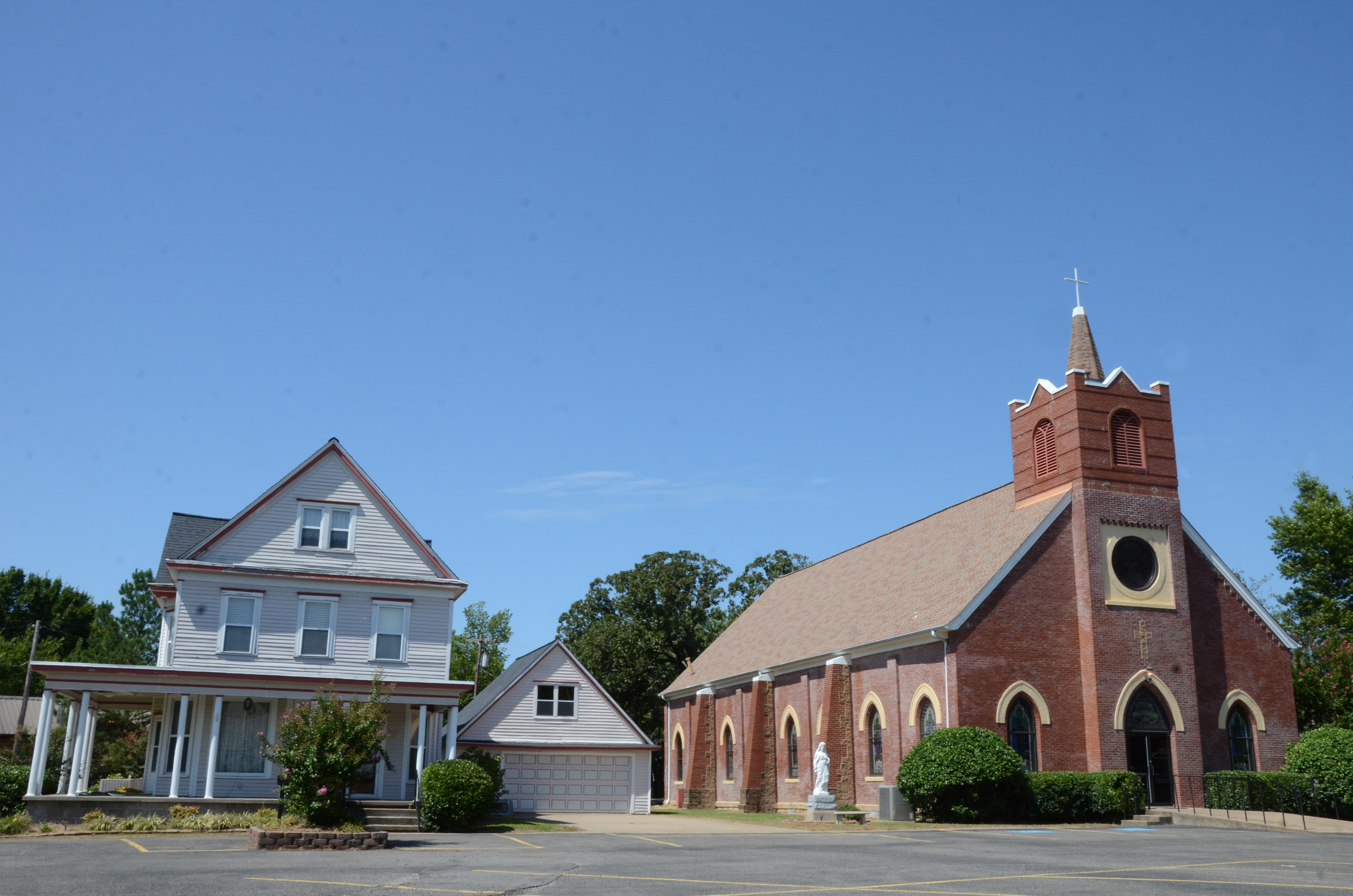

- Location within Oklahoma Location within the United States
- Location: 102 Center Point Rd., Wilburton, Oklahoma
- Coordinates: 34°55′0″N 95°18′44″W
- Area: 1 acre (0.40 ha)
- Built: 1912
- Architectural style: Gothic Revival
- MPS: Latimer County Coal Mining TR
- NRHP reference No.: 80003272
- Added to NRHP: November 6, 1980

Sacred Heart Catholic Church and Rectory is a historic Roman Catholic church site at 102 Center Point Road in Wilburton, Latimer County, Oklahoma. This site was built in 1912, and has been in continuous use since then. The church and rectory sit on a one-acre plot. It was added to the National Register of Historic Places (NRHP) on November 26, 1980. Originally, this was a parish church serving coal miners and their families, totaling about 150 people at the peak of the boom. Usually, since the coal boom ended many years ago, the church serves between 75 and 80 people.

The church's architectural style is a simplified Gothic Revival style. Its footprint is 48 feet (15 m) by 90 feet (27 m). It is topped with a small steeple. It has nine stained-glass windows on the north and south sides and two in the front wall. (Note: The photo above seems to show only six windows on the side visible to the camera. - Ed.)

The rectory is the three-story frame building near the church, with a porch extending along the north and east sides. Its interior is largely unchanged, and still has the original woodwork and floors. The third story was used to house children who were orphans of miners.

A fire during the 1930s damaged the roof and steeple of the church, but these were obviously repaired successfully. A 1975 tornado damaged the roof and steeple again. The same storm also damaged the exterior of the rectory. Once again, the damage was repaired and the structures fully restored. (Note: No further information has been found about the extent of damages.)

The church and rectory sit on land donated by James Degnan and James McConnell, who owned the Eastern Coal and Mining Company. Employees of these men provided much of the labor required to construct the facilities, and did this on their own time, after working a full shift digging coal during the day. Regina and McConnell also recruited Father Glynn, a missionary from New York, as the first pastor. Father Glynn also operated a school for grades 1-12 until the late 1920s. The school staff were Sisters of Mercy.
