= Cupco Church =

Historic church in Oklahoma, United States

- U.S. National Register of Historic Places
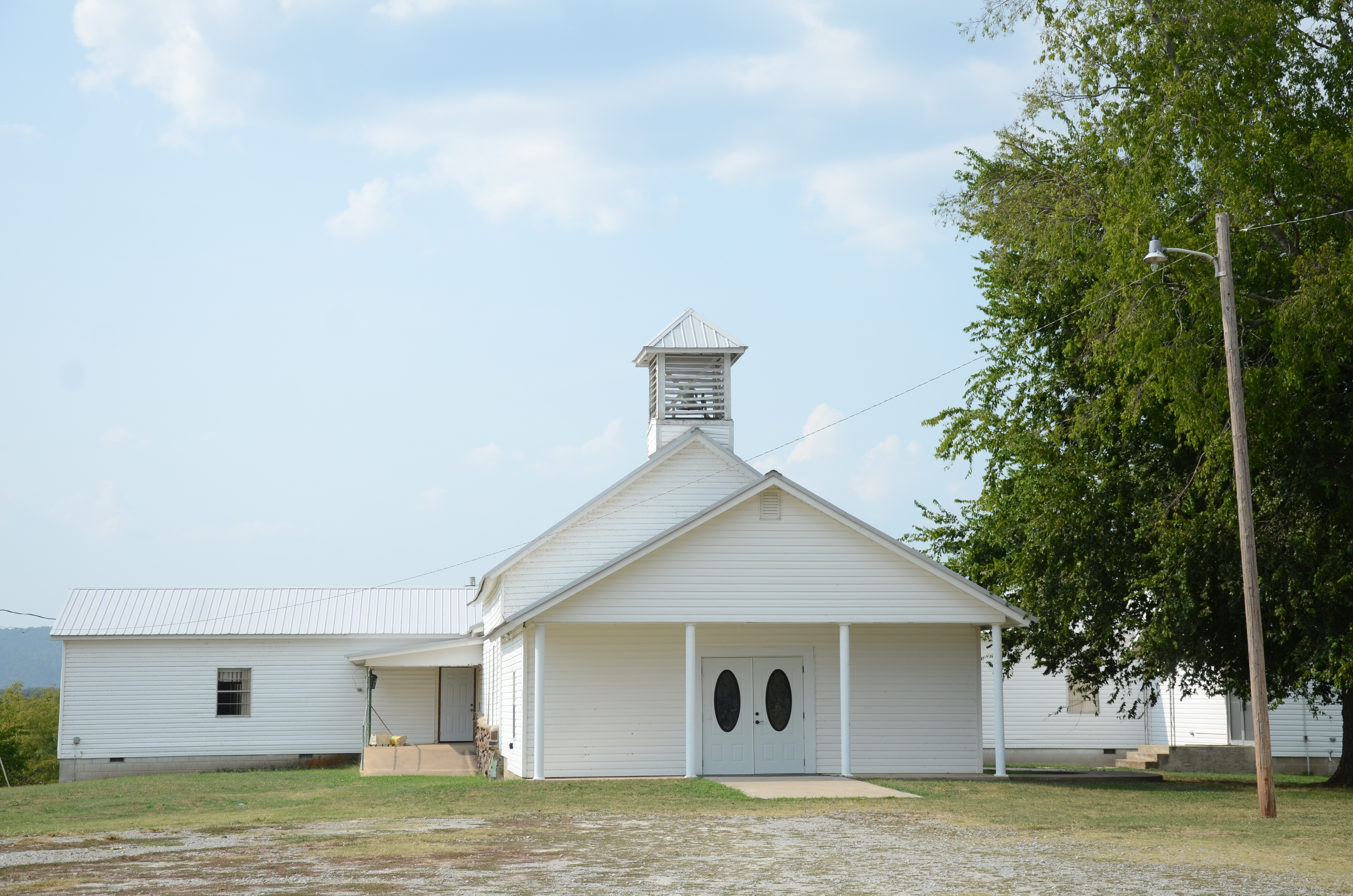

- Location within Oklahoma Location within the United States
- Nearest city: Yanush, Oklahoma
- Coordinates: 34°41′45″N 95°18′33″W
- Area: 1 acre (0.40 ha)
- Built: 1889
- NRHP reference No.: 80003273
- Added to NRHP: November 6, 1980

Cupco Church (also known as Cupco Free Will Baptist Church) is a historic church building near Yanush, Oklahoma. It was built in 1899 and added to the National Register of Historic Places in 1980.

It is 35 by 25 feet (10.7 m × 7.6 m) in plan and has a small wooden bell tower near the front gable.

It is located south of Yanush off of Oklahoma State Highway 2.

The NRHP nomination of 1979 stated that the church "is one of Southeast Oklahoma's oldest continuously functioning churches. It was built by Methodist missionaries, instrumental agents in the forceful accommodation of the Choctaws to white culture. By 1889 when the church was built, it was already assumed that the Choctaws were assimilated into the Christian religion. The Choctaw Nation maintained the church for tribal members of the Methodist faith until 1914. At that time the building and grounds were sold to the Oklahoma Free Will Baptist Association. In spite of, or perhaps because of, denominational change, most of the approximately fifty member congregation are Choctaw."
