= Eastern Oklahoma State College =

Community college in Wilburton, Oklahoma, U.S.

Coordinates: 34°54′54″N 95°19′45″W

- Type: Public community college
- Accreditation: North Central Association of Colleges and Secondary Schools
- Location: Wilburton, Oklahoma, United States

Eastern Oklahoma State College is a public community college in Wilburton, Oklahoma. It is accredited by the North Central Association of Colleges and Secondary Schools. The school has a branch campus in McAlester and teaching sites in Antlers (Kiamichi Technology Center) and Idabel. The enrollment in fall 2023 was 1,292.

== History ==
Founded in 1908 as the Oklahoma School of Mines and Metallurgy, Eastern Oklahoma State College primarily focused on mining engineering. The school opened on January 11, 1909, with one hundred students and George E. Ladd as president. The first graduates received diplomas in 1912.

The school added liberal arts educational programs later. It closed during World War I because of insufficient enrollment, but reopened after the war. In 1927, the mining programs were phased out and the school was renamed as Eastern Oklahoma College. The Oklahoma Miner Institute, which is housed on campus, is a legacy of the original purpose of the school. The Oklahoma Legislature again renamed the school in 1941 as the Eastern Oklahoma Agricultural and Mechanical College and put it under the supervision of the State Board of Agriculture. The North Central Association of Colleges and Secondary Schools accredited the school in March 1954. In 1972, it was renamed as the Eastern Oklahoma State College, with its own governing board.

== Notable alumni ==
- Tom Colbert, Associate Justice of the Oklahoma Supreme Court
- Merlin Little Thunder, Native American artist
- George Nigh, former Governor of Oklahoma (1979-1987)
- Robert Purcell, head of hepatitis viruses section for the National Institutes of Health
- Larry Robinson, former NBA player and NBA champion
