= Pusley's Station =

Overland Mail stagecoach stop in Oklahoma

- U.S. National Register of Historic Places
- Location within Oklahoma Location within the United States
- Nearest city: Higgins, Oklahoma
- Coordinates: 34°41′52″N 95°28′15″W
- Area: 5 acres (2.0 ha)
- Built: 1858
- NRHP reference No.: 72001068
- Added to NRHP: April 13, 1972

Pusley's Station was a stage stand on the old Butterfield Overland Mail route in Indian Territory. It was located in what is now Latimer County, Oklahoma, on the south side of Gains Creek. The station was named for Silas Pusley, a trader and member of a prominent Choctaw family. In 1859, the Choctaw Council granted Pusley the right to build a bridge and tollbooth across Gains Creek near his station.

Pusley's Station was added to the National Register of Historic Places (#72001068) in 1972. The listing included a contributing building, two contributing structures, and a contributing site.

== Sources ==
- Shirk, George H. Oklahoma Place Names. Norman: University of Oklahoma Press, 1987: ISBN 0-8061-2028-2 .
- Wright, Murial H.; George H. Shirk; Kenny A. Franks. Mark of Heritage. Oklahoma City: Oklahoma Historical Society, 1976.
- Wright, Muriel H. "The Butterfield Overland Mail One Hundred Years Ago", Chronicles of Oklahoma 35:1 (January 1957) 55-71 (accessed August 22, 2006).
