= Wilburton, Oklahoma =

- City
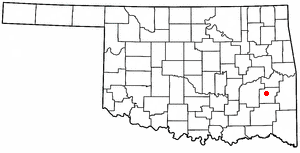
- Location of Wilburton within Oklahoma
- Coordinates: 34°55′6″N 95°18′38″W
- Country: United States
- State: Oklahoma
- County: Latimer

Government
  - Type: Aldermanic
  - Mayor: Loran Mayes

Area
  - Total: 3.13 sq mi (8.10 km^{2})
  - Land: 3.11 sq mi (8.05 km^{2})
  - Water: 0.019 sq mi (0.05 km^{2})
- Elevation: 659 ft (201 m)

Population (2020)
  - Total: 2,285
  - Density: 735.1/sq mi (283.84/km^{2})
- Time zone: UTC-6 (CST)
  - Summer (DST): UTC-5 (CDT)
- ZIP code: 74578
- Area code: 539/918
- FIPS code: 40-81000
- GNIS ID: 1099754
- Website: www.wilburton.gov

Wilburton is a city in and the county seat of Latimer County, Oklahoma, United States. The city had a population of 2,285 as of the 2020 Census. Robbers Cave State Park is 5 miles (8.0 km) north of Wilburton.

== History ==
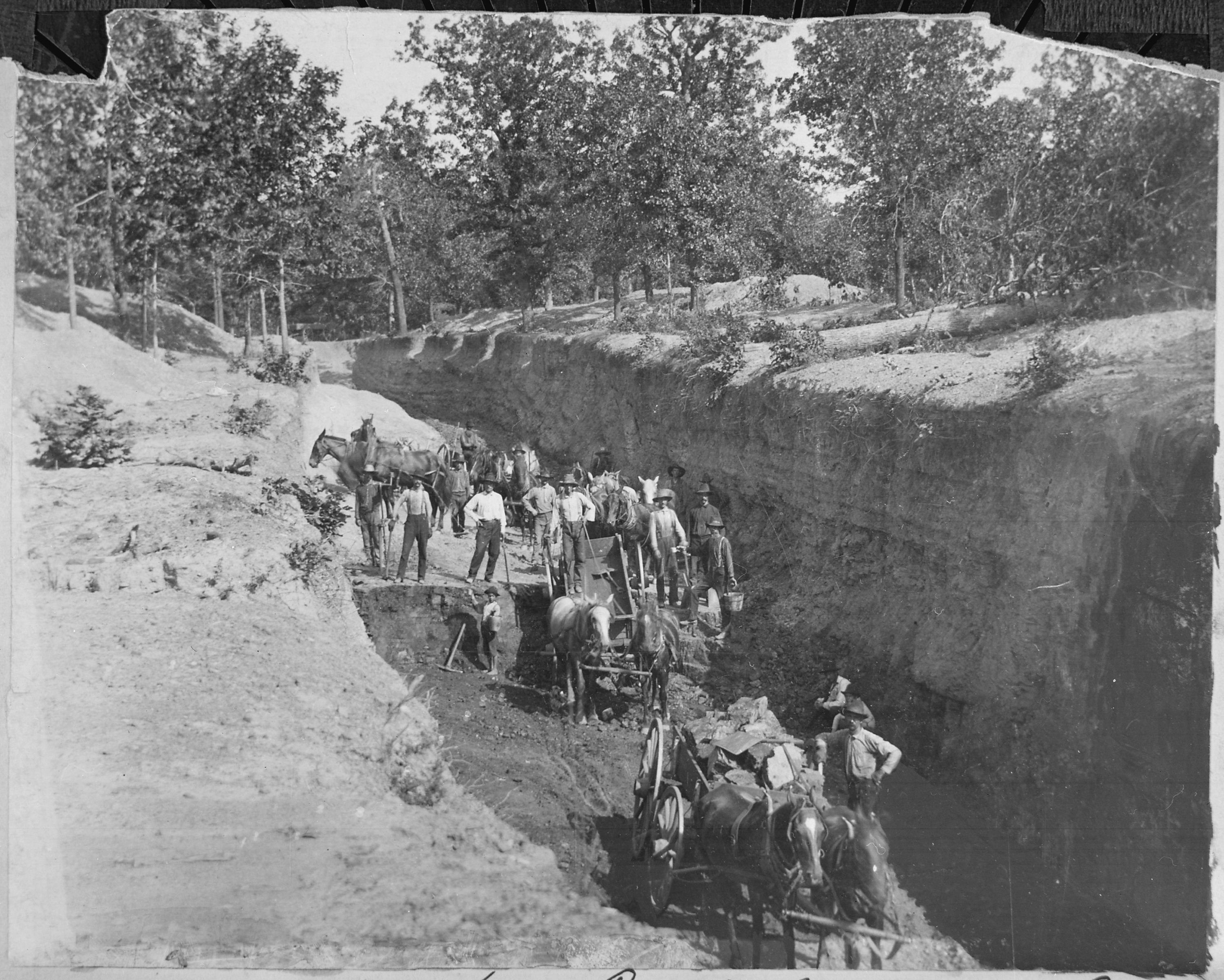
Loading coal in the strip pits at a coal mine in Wilburton, 1898

The community now known as Wilburton was originally established as a group of settlers living around Riddle's Station, a stop for the Butterfield Overland Mail stagecoach along the trail from Fort Smith, Arkansas to Fort Worth, Texas. Riddle's Station was built in 1858 and the Overland Stage operated from 1857 to 1861. According to the Oklahoma Encyclopedia of History and Culture, it was likely named for Will Burton, a contractor and surveyor who was involved in platting the townsite and building the Choctaw Coal and Railway Company line from Wister to McAlester. According to Oklahoma Place Names, it was named after Elisha Wilbur, who was the president of the Lehigh Valley Railroad. The post office was established at Wilburton, Indian Territory in 1891. At the time of its founding, the community was located in Sans Bois County, a part of the Moshulatubbee District of the Choctaw Nation.

On 13 January 1926, ninety-one people were killed in a coal mine explosion in or near Wilburton.

A tornado struck Wilburton on May 5, 1960, and injured more than one hundred people and killed thirteen.

Initially, the local economy was based on cattle production and shipping. Then, during the 1890s and early 20th century, coal mining became the largest industry. In 1909, the state established the Oklahoma School of Mines and Metallurgy in Wilburton. The school name was later changed to Eastern Oklahoma A&M College and it is now known as Eastern Oklahoma State College.

== Geography ==
Wilburton is located at 34°55′6″N 95°18′38″W (34.918379, -95.310645). According to the United States Census Bureau, the city has a total area of 3.0 square miles (7.8 km^{2}), of which 3.0 square miles (7.8 km^{2}) is land and 0.33% is water.

== Government ==
Wilburton has a statutory aldermanic form of government.

== Demographics ==
Historical population
Census	Pop.	Note	%±
1910	2,277		—
1920	2,226		−2.2%
1930	1,524		−31.5%
1940	1,925		26.3%
1950	1,939		0.7%
1960	1,772		−8.6%
1970	2,504		41.3%
1980	2,996		19.6%
1990	3,092		3.2%
2000	2,972		−3.9%
2010	2,843		−4.3%
2020	2,285		−19.6%
U.S. Decennial Census

=== 2020 census ===
As of the 2020 census, Wilburton had a population of 2,285. The median age was 34.9 years. 23.4% of residents were under the age of 18 and 15.5% of residents were 65 years of age or older. For every 100 females there were 91.2 males, and for every 100 females age 18 and over there were 84.2 males age 18 and over.

0% of residents lived in urban areas, while 100.0% lived in rural areas.

There were 853 households in Wilburton, of which 32.2% had children under the age of 18 living in them. Of all households, 37.3% were married-couple households, 21.7% were households with a male householder and no spouse or partner present, and 33.9% were households with a female householder and no spouse or partner present. About 35.8% of all households were made up of individuals and 14.6% had someone living alone who was 65 years of age or older.

There were 1,106 housing units, of which 22.9% were vacant. Among occupied housing units, 59.7% were owner-occupied and 40.3% were renter-occupied. The homeowner vacancy rate was 3.8% and the rental vacancy rate was 19.4%.

Racial composition as of the 2020 census
Race	Percent
White	63.5%
Black or African American	0.8%
American Indian and Alaska Native	18.8%
Asian	1.5%
Native Hawaiian and Other Pacific Islander	0.2%
Some other race	1.5%
Two or more races	13.7%
Hispanic or Latino (of any race)	6.4%

=== 2000 census ===
As of the 2000 census there were 2,972 people, 1,004 households, and 674 families residing in the city. The population density was 997.1 inhabitants per square mile (385.0/km^{2}). There were 1,200 housing units at an average density of 402.6 per square mile (155.4/km^{2}). The racial makeup of the city was 74.93% White, 1.35% African American, 16.92% Native American, 0.30% Asian, 0.03% Pacific Islander, 0.87% from other races, and 5.59% from two or more races. Hispanic or Latino of any race were 2.36% of the population.

There were 1,004 households, out of which 34.0% had children under the age of 18 living with them, 48.4% were married couples living together, 14.5% had a female householder with no husband present, and 32.8% were non-families. 30.3% of all households were made up of individuals, and 15.4% had someone living alone who was 65 years of age or older. The average household size was 2.49 and the average family size was 3.07.

In the city, the population was spread out, with 24.4% under the age of 18, 20.5% from 18 to 24, 23.4% from 25 to 44, 16.4% from 45 to 64, and 15.4% who were 65 years of age or older. The median age was 30 years. For every 100 females, there were 85.5 males. For every 100 females age 18 and over, there were 80.7 males.

The median income for a household in the city was $20,878, and the median income for a family was $25,543. Males had a median income of $22,917 versus $18,684 for females. The per capita income for the city was $9,503. About 20.5% of families and 24.9% of the population were below the poverty line, including 31.8% of those under age 18 and 18.0% of those age 65 or over.

== Parks and recreation ==
City of Wilburton park facilities include the Gary Rosebure Recreational Park.

Sycamore Springs Golf Course is a 9-hole, semi-private golf course opened in 1970.

Robbers Cave State Park, which encompasses Lake Carlton, Lake Wayne Wallace, and Coon Creek Lake, is located approximately 5 miles (8 km) north-northwest of the town.

Lloyd Church Lake to the south-southeast of town.

== Education ==
=== Primary and secondary education ===
The Wilburton Public School District oversees the Grace Russell Elementary School, the John G. Shero Middle School, and the Nancy W. Taylor High School.

=== Adult education ===
Eastern Oklahoma State College (formerly known as Oklahoma School of Mines and Metallurgy and later as Eastern Oklahoma A&M College) and Kiamichi Technology Center are located in Wilburton.

== Transportation ==
Wilburton is served by US Route 270 and Oklahoma State Highway 2.

Wilburton is in the region served by the KI BOIS Area Transit System ("KATS"), a low-cost public bus/van service established in 1983 to help communities, primarily in southeast Oklahoma, by providing access to Senior Citizen centers, groceries, medical services, and jobs.

Wilburton Municipal Airport (FAA ID: H05) is 4 miles west of town, and features a 3000’ x 60’ paved runway.

Commercial air transportation is available out of Fort Smith Regional Airport, about 70 miles northeast.

The town has freight rail service through the Arkansas-Oklahoma Railroad. That line in turn interchanges with the Kansas City Southern Railway at Howe, Oklahoma, and with the Union Pacific Railway at McAlester, Oklahoma.
