= Hanson, Oklahoma =

Census-designated place in Oklahoma

- Census-designated place
- Location within Oklahoma Location within the United States
- Coordinates: 35°26′15″N 94°41′45″W
- Country: United States
- State: Oklahoma
- County: Sequoyah

Area
  - Total: 0.33 sq mi (0.86 km^{2})
  - Land: 0.32 sq mi (0.84 km^{2})
  - Water: 0.0077 sq mi (0.02 km^{2})
- Elevation: 581 ft (177 m)

Population (2020)
  - Total: 58
  - Density: 178.2/sq mi (68.79/km^{2})
- Time zone: UTC-6 (Central (CST))
  - Summer (DST): UTC-5 (CDT)
- ZIP Code: 74955 (Sallisaw)
- Area codes: 918/539
- FIPS code: 40-32400
- GNIS feature ID: 2812870

Hanson is an unincorporated community and census-designated place (CDP) in Sequoyah County, Oklahoma, United States. It was first listed as a CDP prior to the 2020 census. As of the 2020 census, Hanson had a population of 58.

The CDP is in east-central Sequoyah County, at the base of Hanson Mountain, which rises 200 feet (61 m) above the community. Hanson is 6 miles (10 km) southeast of Sallisaw, the Sequoyah county seat, and 7 miles (11 km) northwest of Muldrow.

== Demographics ==
Historical population
Census	Pop.	Note	%±
2020	58		—
U.S. Decennial Census

=== 2020 census ===
As of the 2020 census, Hanson had a population of 58. The median age was 34.0 years. 32.8% of residents were under the age of 18 and 24.1% of residents were 65 years of age or older. For every 100 females there were 141.7 males, and for every 100 females age 18 and over there were 129.4 males age 18 and over.

0.0% of residents lived in urban areas, while 100.0% lived in rural areas.

There were 22 households in Hanson, of which 45.5% had children under the age of 18 living in them. Of all households, 81.8% were married-couple households, 9.1% were households with a male householder and no spouse or partner present, and 4.5% were households with a female householder and no spouse or partner present. About 0.0% of all households were made up of individuals and 0.0% had someone living alone who was 65 years of age or older.

There were 24 housing units, of which 8.3% were vacant. The homeowner vacancy rate was 0.0% and the rental vacancy rate was 0.0%.

Racial composition as of the 2020 census
Race	Number	Percent
White	30	51.7%
Black or African American	0	0.0%
American Indian and Alaska Native	13	22.4%
Asian	1	1.7%
Native Hawaiian and Other Pacific Islander	0	0.0%
Some other race	0	0.0%
Two or more races	14	24.1%
Hispanic or Latino (of any race)	2	3.4%
