= Evening Shade (disambiguation) =

Evening Shade is an American television series.

Evening Shade may also refer to:

- Evening Shade, Arkansas, a city
- Evening Shade, Scott County, Arkansas, an unincorporated community
- Evening Shade, Missouri, an unincorporated community
- Evening Shade, Oklahoma, a census-designated place
- "Evening Shade", a song by Dolly Parton from her 1969 studio album My Blue Ridge Mountain Boy
