= Marble City (disambiguation) =

Marble City or The Marble City may refer to:

== United States ==
- Marble City, Oklahoma, a town
- Marble City Community, Oklahoma, a census-designated place
- Marble Falls, Arkansas, an unincorporated community, originally known as Marble City
- Sylacauga, Alabama, sometimes known as "The Marble City"
- Marble City Media, owner of Alabama radio stations WSGN (FM) and WFXO (AM)

== Elsewhere ==
- Igbeti, Oyo State, Nigeria, a town, sometimes known as "The Marble City"
- Kilkenny, Ireland, a city, sometimes known as "The Marble City"
- Ashgabat, the capital city of Turkmenistan
