= Brent, Oklahoma =

- CDP
- Location within the state of Oklahoma
- Coordinates: 35°23′09″N 94°46′47″W
- Country: United States
- State: Oklahoma
- County: Sequoyah

Area
  - Total: 15.71 sq mi (40.69 km^{2})
  - Land: 11.18 sq mi (28.96 km^{2})
  - Water: 4.53 sq mi (11.73 km^{2})
- Elevation: 492 ft (150 m)

Population (2020)
  - Total: 760
  - Density: 68.0/sq mi (26.24/km^{2})
- Time zone: UTC-6 (Central (CST))
  - Summer (DST): UTC-5 (CDT)
- FIPS code: 40-08650
- GNIS feature ID: 2407901

Brent is a census-designated place (CDP) in Sequoyah County, Oklahoma, United States, south of Sallisaw. It is part of the Fort Smith, Arkansas-Oklahoma Metropolitan Statistical Area. As of the 2020 census, Brent had a population of 760.

The post office opened May 6, 1896 and closed May 31, 1929. It was located in District 11 of the old Indian Territory. Brent was named for the Brent Ferry on the nearby Arkansas River.

== Geography ==
According to the United States Census Bureau, the CDP has a total area of 15.6 square miles (40 km^{2}), of which 11.1 square miles (29 km^{2}) is land and 4.5 square miles (12 km^{2}) (28.71%) is water.

== Government ==
The United States Coast Guard has an ANT (Aid-to-Navigations Team) station at the end of D1135 Road.

== Demographics ==
Historical population
Census	Pop.	Note	%±
2020	760		—
U.S. Decennial Census

=== 2020 census ===
As of the 2020 census, Brent had a population of 760. The median age was 45.7 years. 21.3% of residents were under the age of 18 and 22.4% of residents were 65 years of age or older. For every 100 females there were 98.4 males, and for every 100 females age 18 and over there were 96.1 males age 18 and over.

0.0% of residents lived in urban areas, while 100.0% lived in rural areas.

There were 289 households in Brent, of which 35.6% had children under the age of 18 living in them. Of all households, 59.9% were married-couple households, 13.5% were households with a male householder and no spouse or partner present, and 22.5% were households with a female householder and no spouse or partner present. About 20.4% of all households were made up of individuals and 12.8% had someone living alone who was 65 years of age or older.

There were 325 housing units, of which 11.1% were vacant. The homeowner vacancy rate was 1.8% and the rental vacancy rate was 23.3%.

Racial composition as of the 2020 census
Race	Number	Percent
White	468	61.6%
Black or African American	10	1.3%
American Indian and Alaska Native	169	22.2%
Asian	7	0.9%
Native Hawaiian and Other Pacific Islander	0	0.0%
Some other race	5	0.7%
Two or more races	101	13.3%
Hispanic or Latino (of any race)	14	1.8%

=== 2000 census ===
As of the census of 2000, there were 504 people, 206 households, and 148 families residing in the CDP. The population density was 45.2 inhabitants per square mile (17.5/km^{2}). There were 233 housing units at an average density of 20.9 per square mile (8.1/km^{2}). The racial makeup of the CDP was 78.97% White, 0.60% African American, 14.48% Native American, 0.40% Asian, 0.60% from other races, and 4.96% from two or more races. Hispanic or Latino of any race were 0.60% of the population.

There were 206 households, out of which 31.6% had children under the age of 18 living with them, 64.1% were married couples living together, 6.8% had a female householder with no husband present, and 27.7% were non-families. 23.8% of all households were made up of individuals, and 8.7% had someone living alone who was 65 years of age or older. The average household size was 2.45 and the average family size was 2.93.

In the CDP, the population was spread out, with 23.8% under the age of 18, 7.5% from 18 to 24, 28.2% from 25 to 44, 26.8% from 45 to 64, and 13.7% who were 65 years of age or older. The median age was 38 years. For every 100 females, there were 109.1 males. For every 100 females age 18 and over, there were 106.5 males.

The median income for a household in the CDP was $24,141, and the median income for a family was $27,813. Males had a median income of $21,250 versus $16,042 for females. The per capita income for the CDP was $11,968. About 10.1% of families and 13.9% of the population were below the poverty line, including 5.5% of those under age 18 and 10.6% of those age 65 or over.
