= Phyllis Yargee =

Cherokee politician and educator

Cherokee Nation Tribal Councilor for the 3rd district
- In office 2003–2007 Serving with David W. Thornton Sr.
- Succeeded by: Sam Ed Bush Jr.

Personal details
- Citizenship: Cherokee Nation; United States
- Children: 4
- Education: Connors State College; Northeastern State University

Phyllis Yargee (born c. 1956) is a Cherokee politician and educator who served on the Cherokee Nation tribal council for district 3 from 2003 to 2007.

== Life ==
Yargee was born c. 1956 and raised in Notchietown, Oklahoma. She grew up immersed in Cherokee and Creek languages, which she learned from her mother. Yargee attended Connors State College before transferring to Northeastern State University (NSU), where she earned a bachelor's degree in education with a focus on special education, speech, and hearing.

Yargee began her career working with the Cherokee Nation, where she managed the Johnson-O'Malley Program within the education department. In this role, she assisted Cherokee citizens in the Gore area, developing a reputation as a community advocate. Yargee worked for 14 years in the Cherokee Nation's Education Department, where she made significant contributions to cultural preservation and education. She helped establish summer culture camps, the Cherokee Challenge, and Language Bowls, initiatives designed to engage Cherokee youth in learning and preserving their language and traditions. Additionally, she served as a teacher in the tribe's Adult Education Program.

In 2003, Yargee was elected alongside David W. Thornton Sr. as one of the two Cherokee Nation tribal councilors representing district 3 of Sequoyah County. Her main goal was to provide better representation for Cherokee citizens in the western part of the county, particularly in Gore and Webbers Falls. As a councilor, she has focused on improving communication between the Cherokee Nation and its citizens, working on fiscal matters such as the 2004 budget, and serving on various committees, including the education, executive and finance, rules and employment committees. She also co-chaired the language and culture committee. She was succeeded by Sam Ed Bush Jr. in 2007.

As of 2003, Yargee is also a Cherokee language teacher at Gore Elementary School, where she teaches the language using methods that prioritize spoken fluency before reading and writing.

Yargee has four sons.

== See also ==
- List of Native American politicians
- Native American women in politics
