= Sycamore, Oklahoma =

Sycamore is the name of two census-designated places:

- Sycamore, Delaware County, Oklahoma
- Sycamore, Sequoyah County, Oklahoma
