= Belfonte, Oklahoma =

Belfonte
- CDP
- Location within the state of Oklahoma
- Coordinates: 35°32′13″N 94°33′03″W
- Country: United States
- State: Oklahoma
- County: Sequoyah

Area
  - Total: 7.93 sq mi (20.55 km^{2})
  - Land: 7.89 sq mi (20.44 km^{2})
  - Water: 0.039 sq mi (0.10 km^{2})
- Elevation: 663 ft (202 m)

Population (2020)
  - Total: 298
  - Density: 37.8/sq mi (14.58/km^{2})
- Time zone: UTC-6 (Central (CST))
  - Summer (DST): UTC-5 (CST)
- FIPS code: 40-05070
- GNIS feature ID: 2407823

Belfonte is a census-designated place (CDP) in Sequoyah County, Oklahoma, United States. It is part of the Fort Smith, Arkansas-Oklahoma Metropolitan Statistical Area. As of the 2020 census, Belfonte had a population of 298.

== Geography ==
According to the United States Census Bureau, the CDP has a total area of 7.9 square miles (20 km^{2}), all land.

== Demographics ==
Historical population
| Census | Pop. | Note | %± |
|---|---|---|---|
| 2020 | 298 | | — |
U.S. Decennial Census

=== 2020 census ===
As of the 2020 census, Belfonte had a population of 298. The median age was 51.5 years. 14.8% of residents were under the age of 18 and 23.5% of residents were 65 years of age or older. For every 100 females there were 102.7 males, and for every 100 females age 18 and over there were 103.2 males age 18 and over.

0.0% of residents lived in urban areas, while 100.0% lived in rural areas.

There were 123 households in Belfonte, of which 22.0% had children under the age of 18 living in them. Of all households, 45.5% were married-couple households, 26.8% were households with a male householder and no spouse or partner present, and 18.7% were households with a female householder and no spouse or partner present. About 30.1% of all households were made up of individuals and 12.2% had someone living alone who was 65 years of age or older.

There were 136 housing units, of which 9.6% were vacant. The homeowner vacancy rate was 0.9% and the rental vacancy rate was 15.8%.

Racial composition as of the 2020 census
| Race | Number | Percent |
|---|---|---|
| White | 140 | 47.0% |
| Black or African American | 1 | 0.3% |
| American Indian and Alaska Native | 106 | 35.6% |
| Asian | 5 | 1.7% |
| Native Hawaiian and Other Pacific Islander | 0 | 0.0% |
| Some other race | 7 | 2.3% |
| Two or more races | 39 | 13.1% |
| Hispanic or Latino (of any race) | 12 | 4.0% |

=== 2000 census ===
As of the census of 2000, there were 426 people, 131 households, and 101 families residing in the CDP. The population density was 53.8 inhabitants per square mile (20.8/km^{2}). There were 139 housing units at an average density of 17.6 per square mile (6.8/km^{2}). The racial makeup of the CDP was 42.25% White, 0.23% African American, 50.23% Native American, 1.88% from other races, and 5.40% from two or more races. Hispanic or Latino of any race were 4.46% of the population.

There were 131 households, out of which 41.2% had children under the age of 18 living with them, 58.8% were married couples living together, 8.4% had a female householder with no husband present, and 22.9% were non-families. 17.6% of all households were made up of individuals, and 6.1% had someone living alone who was 65 years of age or older. The average household size was 3.25 and the average family size was 3.67.

In the CDP, the population was spread out, with 30.0% under the age of 18, 10.8% from 18 to 24, 31.5% from 25 to 44, 20.4% from 45 to 64, and 7.3% who were 65 years of age or older. The median age was 30 years. For every 100 females, there were 105.8 males. For every 100 females age 18 and over, there were 108.4 males.

The median income for a household in the CDP was $32,143, and the median income for a family was $40,469. Males had a median income of $25,250 versus $17,344 for females. The per capita income for the CDP was $15,786. About 9.9% of families and 14.9% of the population were below the poverty line, including 14.2% of those under age 18 and 21.9% of those age 65 or over.

== Education ==
About half of it is in the Belfonte Public School school district. One other part is in the Liberty Public School school district while another part is in the Muldrow Public Schools school district.
