= Nicut, Oklahoma =

- Unincorporated community
- Location within Oklahoma Location within the United States
- Coordinates: 35°35′55″N 94°33′46″W
- Country: United States
- State: Oklahoma
- County: Sequoyah

Area
  - Total: 16.32 sq mi (42.27 km^{2})
  - Land: 16.19 sq mi (41.94 km^{2})
  - Water: 0.12 sq mi (0.32 km^{2})
- Elevation: 561 ft (171 m)

Population (2020)
  - Total: 286
  - Density: 17.7/sq mi (6.82/km^{2})
- Time zone: UTC-6 (Central (CST))
  - Summer (DST): UTC-5 (CDT)
- Area codes: 918 & 539
- GNIS feature ID: 2584386

Nicut is an unincorporated community and census-designated place in Sequoyah County, Oklahoma, United States. As of the 2020 census, Nicut had a population of 286.

== History ==
Nicut was originally named Vrona; its post office changed its name on December 16, 1925. It was named for a "nigh cut", or shortcut, on the road to Muldrow. The community's post office closed on November 30, 1954.

== Geography ==
According to the U.S. Census Bureau, the community has an area of 16.299 square miles (42.21 km^{2}); 16.181 square miles (41.91 km^{2}) of its area is land, and 0.118 square miles (0.31 km^{2}) is water.

== Demographics ==
Historical population
Census	Pop.	Note	%±
2010	360		—
2020	286		−20.6%
U.S. Decennial Census

=== 2020 census ===
As of the 2020 census, Nicut had a population of 286. The median age was 41.5 years. 23.1% of residents were under the age of 18 and 14.3% of residents were 65 years of age or older. For every 100 females there were 111.9 males, and for every 100 females age 18 and over there were 100.0 males age 18 and over.

0.0% of residents lived in urban areas, while 100.0% lived in rural areas.

There were 106 households in Nicut, of which 30.2% had children under the age of 18 living in them. Of all households, 51.9% were married-couple households, 18.9% were households with a male householder and no spouse or partner present, and 28.3% were households with a female householder and no spouse or partner present. About 26.4% of all households were made up of individuals and 17.9% had someone living alone who was 65 years of age or older.

There were 131 housing units, of which 19.1% were vacant. The homeowner vacancy rate was 1.2% and the rental vacancy rate was 4.2%.

Racial composition as of the 2020 census
Race	Number	Percent
White	113	39.5%
Black or African American	0	0.0%
American Indian and Alaska Native	148	51.7%
Asian	1	0.3%
Native Hawaiian and Other Pacific Islander	0	0.0%
Some other race	1	0.3%
Two or more races	23	8.0%
Hispanic or Latino (of any race)	18	6.3%

=== 2010 census ===
As of the 2010 census, Nicut had a population of 360.

== Education ==
It is in the Belfonte Public School school district.
