= Pinhook Corners, Oklahoma =

- CDP
- Location within the state of Oklahoma
- Coordinates: 35°32′10″N 94°53′06″W
- Country: United States
- State: Oklahoma
- County: Sequoyah

Area
  - Total: 9.61 sq mi (24.89 km^{2})
  - Land: 9.58 sq mi (24.82 km^{2})
  - Water: 0.027 sq mi (0.07 km^{2})
- Elevation: 692 ft (211 m)

Population (2020)
  - Total: 139
  - Density: 15/sq mi (5.6/km^{2})
- Time zone: UTC-6 (Central (CST))
  - Summer (DST): UTC-5 (CDT)
- FIPS code: 40-59125
- GNIS feature ID: 1096681

Pinhook Corners (Cherokee: ᎤᏍᏆᏘ) is a census-designated place (CDP) in Sequoyah County, Oklahoma, United States. It is part of the Fort Smith, Arkansas-Oklahoma Metropolitan Statistical Area. The population was 161 at the 2000 census.

== Geography ==
According to the United States Census Bureau, the CDP has a total area of 9.7 square miles (25 km^{2}), all land.

It is northeast of Vian and northwest of Sallisaw.

== Demographics ==
Historical population
Census	Pop.	Note	%±
2020	139		—
U.S. Decennial Census

As of the census of 2000, there were 161 people, 56 households, and 51 families residing in the CDP. The population density was 16.7 inhabitants per square mile (6.4/km^{2}). There were 58 housing units at an average density of 6.0 per square mile (2.3/km^{2}). The racial makeup of the CDP was 37.89% White, 56.52% Native American, and 5.59% from two or more races.

There were 56 households, out of which 33.9% had children under the age of 18 living with them, 73.2% were married couples living together, 8.9% had a female householder with no husband present, and 8.9% were non-families. 8.9% of all households were made up of individuals, and 3.6% had someone living alone who was 65 years of age or older. The average household size was 2.88 and the average family size was 2.98.

In the CDP, the population was spread out, with 26.1% under the age of 18, 9.9% from 18 to 24, 24.8% from 25 to 44, 28.6% from 45 to 64, and 10.6% who were 65 years of age or older. The median age was 35 years. For every 100 females, there were 96.3 males. For every 100 females age 18 and over, there were 98.3 males.

The median income for a household in the CDP was $23,958, and the median income for a family was $24,167. Males had a median income of $14,583 versus $27,500 for females. The per capita income for the CDP was $12,003. About 17.5% of families and 9.2% of the population were below the poverty line, including 12.5% of those under the age of eighteen and 77.8% of those 65 or over.
