= Cottonwood, Sequoyah County, Oklahoma =

Cottonwood, Oklahoma
- Unincorporated community
- Location within the state of Oklahoma Cottonwood (the United States)
- Coordinates: 35°22′06″N 94°32′57″W
- Country: United States
- State: Oklahoma
- County: Sequoyah
- Elevation: 486 ft (148 m)
- Time zone: UTC-6 (Central (CST))
  - Summer (DST): UTC-5 (CDT)
- GNIS feature ID: 1100327

Cottonwood is an unincorporated community in Sequoyah County, Oklahoma, United States. It is located four miles south of Muldrow, near the Oklahoma-Arkansas border.

== History ==
A post office operated in Cottonwood from March 3, 1882 to June 15, 1909. The area that became Coal County, including Sequoyah, became part of Cherokee Nation in 1829. Between the Civil War and Oklahoma Statehood in 1907, Cottonwood was populated primarily by white intruders who had illegally entered Cherokee Nation.
