= Notchietown, Oklahoma =

- CDP
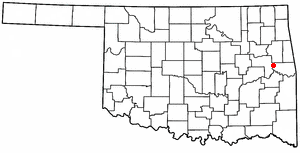
- Location of Notchietown, Oklahoma
- Coordinates: 35°35′08″N 95°05′24″W
- Country: United States
- State: Oklahoma
- County: Sequoyah

Area
  - Total: 7.91 sq mi (20.49 km^{2})
  - Land: 7.81 sq mi (20.24 km^{2})
  - Water: 0.097 sq mi (0.25 km^{2})
- Elevation: 587 ft (179 m)

Population (2020)
  - Total: 302
  - Density: 38.6/sq mi (14.92/km^{2})
- Time zone: UTC-6 (Central (CST))
  - Summer (DST): UTC-5 (CDT)
- FIPS code: 40-52862
- GNIS feature ID: 2408958

Notchietown is a census-designated place (CDP) in Sequoyah County, Oklahoma, United States. It is part of the Fort Smith, Arkansas-Oklahoma Metropolitan Statistical Area. As of the 2020 census, Notchietown had a population of 302.

== Geography ==
Notchietown is located at 35°34′24″N 95°5′19″W (35.573436, -95.088572). According to the United States Census Bureau, the CDP has a total area of 7.9 square miles (20 km^{2}), of which 7.8 square miles (20 km^{2}) is land and 0.1 square miles (0.26 km^{2}) (1.64%) is water.

== Demographics ==
Historical population
Census	Pop.	Note	%±
2020	302		—
U.S. Decennial Census

=== 2020 census ===
As of the 2020 census, Notchietown had a population of 302. The median age was 44.7 years. 21.5% of residents were under the age of 18 and 24.2% of residents were 65 years of age or older. For every 100 females there were 109.7 males, and for every 100 females age 18 and over there were 104.3 males age 18 and over.

0.0% of residents lived in urban areas, while 100.0% lived in rural areas.

There were 131 households in Notchietown, of which 25.2% had children under the age of 18 living in them. Of all households, 58.0% were married-couple households, 26.7% were households with a male householder and no spouse or partner present, and 9.9% were households with a female householder and no spouse or partner present. About 29.0% of all households were made up of individuals and 19.1% had someone living alone who was 65 years of age or older.

There were 171 housing units, of which 23.4% were vacant. The homeowner vacancy rate was 1.0% and the rental vacancy rate was 5.6%.

Racial composition as of the 2020 census
Race	Number	Percent
White	154	51.0%
Black or African American	2	0.7%
American Indian and Alaska Native	110	36.4%
Asian	0	0.0%
Native Hawaiian and Other Pacific Islander	0	0.0%
Some other race	5	1.7%
Two or more races	31	10.3%
Hispanic or Latino (of any race)	4	1.3%

=== 2000 census ===
As of the census of 2000, there were 430 people, 151 households, and 130 families residing in the CDP. The population density was 55.3 inhabitants per square mile (21.4/km^{2}). There were 176 housing units at an average density of 22.6 per square mile (8.7/km^{2}). The racial makeup of the CDP was 70.70% White, 0.70% African American, 20.23% Native American, 0.93% from other races, and 7.44% from two or more races. Hispanic or Latino of any race were 1.16% of the population.

There were 151 households, out of which 36.4% had children under the age of 18 living with them, 70.9% were married couples living together, 10.6% had a female householder with no husband present, and 13.9% were non-families. 11.9% of all households were made up of individuals, and 7.3% had someone living alone who was 65 years of age or older. The average household size was 2.85 and the average family size was 3.08.

In the CDP, the population was spread out, with 27.7% under the age of 18, 6.7% from 18 to 24, 24.2% from 25 to 44, 28.4% from 45 to 64, and 13.0% who were 65 years of age or older. The median age was 38 years. For every 100 females, there were 97.2 males. For every 100 females age 18 and over, there were 93.2 males.

The median income for a household in the CDP was $30,938, and the median income for a family was $32,344. Males had a median income of $22,019 versus $26,000 for females. The per capita income for the CDP was $18,920. About 19.1% of families and 15.6% of the population were below the poverty line, including 10.0% of those under age 18 and 12.7% of those age 65 or over.

== Notable people ==
- Phyllis Yargee, Cherokee Nation tribal councilor (2003–2007)
