= Flute Springs, Oklahoma =

Flute Springs
- CDP
- Location within the state of Oklahoma
- Coordinates: 35°37′23″N 94°48′16″W
- Country: United States
- State: Oklahoma
- County: Sequoyah

Area
  - Total: 4.39 sq mi (11.36 km^{2})
  - Land: 4.33 sq mi (11.22 km^{2})
  - Water: 0.054 sq mi (0.14 km^{2})
- Elevation: 837 ft (255 m)

Population (2020)
  - Total: 87
  - Density: 20.1/sq mi (7.75/km^{2})
- Time zone: UTC-6 (Central (CST))
  - Summer (DST): UTC-5 (CST)
- FIPS code: 40-26525
- GNIS feature ID: 2408222

Flute Springs (Cherokee: ᎠᏤᏡᎩᏍᏗ) is a census-designated place (CDP) in Sequoyah County, Oklahoma, United States. It is part of the Fort Smith, Arkansas-Oklahoma Metropolitan Statistical Area. As of the 2020 census, Flute Springs had a population of 87.

== Geography ==
According to the United States Census Bureau, the CDP has a total area of 4.4 square miles (11 km^{2}), all land.

== Demographics ==
Historical population
Census	Pop.	Note	%±
2020	87		—
U.S. Decennial Census

=== 2020 census ===
As of the 2020 census, Flute Springs had a population of 87. The median age was 41.1 years. 18.4% of residents were under the age of 18 and 25.3% of residents were 65 years of age or older. For every 100 females there were 93.3 males, and for every 100 females age 18 and over there were 82.1 males age 18 and over.

0.0% of residents lived in urban areas, while 100.0% lived in rural areas.

There were 30 households in Flute Springs, of which 43.3% had children under the age of 18 living in them. Of all households, 56.7% were married-couple households, 23.3% were households with a male householder and no spouse or partner present, and 13.3% were households with a female householder and no spouse or partner present. About 20.0% of all households were made up of individuals and 3.3% had someone living alone who was 65 years of age or older.

There were 44 housing units, of which 31.8% were vacant. The homeowner vacancy rate was 6.7% and the rental vacancy rate was 66.7%.

Racial composition as of the 2020 census
Race	Number	Percent
White	25	28.7%
Black or African American	0	0.0%
American Indian and Alaska Native	53	60.9%
Asian	0	0.0%
Native Hawaiian and Other Pacific Islander	0	0.0%
Some other race	0	0.0%
Two or more races	9	10.3%
Hispanic or Latino (of any race)	1	1.1%

=== 2000 census ===
As of the census of 2000, there were 182 people, 62 households, and 49 families residing in the CDP. The population density was 41.7 inhabitants per square mile (16.1/km^{2}). There were 65 housing units at an average density of 14.9 per square mile (5.8/km^{2}). The racial makeup of the CDP was 28.02% White, 61.54% Native American, and 10.44% from two or more races. Hispanic or Latino of any race were 0.55% of the population.

There were 62 households, out of which 24.2% had children under the age of 18 living with them, 54.8% were married couples living together, 17.7% had a female householder with no husband present, and 19.4% were non-families. 17.7% of all households were made up of individuals, and 9.7% had someone living alone who was 65 years of age or older. The average household size was 2.94 and the average family size was 3.20.

In the CDP, the population was spread out, with 21.4% under the age of 18, 12.6% from 18 to 24, 23.1% from 25 to 44, 30.2% from 45 to 64, and 12.6% who were 65 years of age or older. The median age was 40 years. For every 100 females, there were 127.5 males. For every 100 females age 18 and over, there were 120.0 males.

The median income for a household in the CDP was $23,594, and the median income for a family was $23,929. Males had a median income of $22,500 versus $12,857 for females. The per capita income for the CDP was $9,789. About 17.7% of families and 31.0% of the population were below the poverty line, including 40.7% of those under the age of eighteen and 35.7% of those 65 or over.
