= Paradise Hill, Oklahoma =

- Town
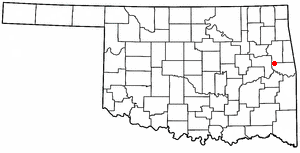
- Location of Paradise Hill, Oklahoma
- Coordinates: 35°37′35″N 95°04′08″W
- Country: United States
- State: Oklahoma
- County: Sequoyah

Area
  - Total: 0.56 sq mi (1.46 km^{2})
  - Land: 0.56 sq mi (1.45 km^{2})
  - Water: 0 sq mi (0.00 km^{2})
- Elevation: 840 ft (260 m)

Population (2020)
  - Total: 73
  - Density: 130.0/sq mi (50.19/km^{2})
- Time zone: UTC-6 (Central (CST))
  - Summer (DST): UTC-5 (CDT)
- FIPS code: 40-57150
- GNIS feature ID: 2413113

Paradise Hill is a town in the northwest corner of Sequoyah County, Oklahoma, United States. It is part of the Fort Smith, Arkansas-Oklahoma Metropolitan Statistical Area. As of the 2020 census, Paradise Hill had a population of 73.

== History ==
Paradise Hill is a relatively new town, having originated in 1954 on the shore of Tenkiller Ferry Lake. There were 47 permanent homes by 1962. The town had already incorporated and owned its own water system. It more than doubled its physical size by 1969 by annexing adjacent land.

== Geography ==
According to the United States Census Bureau, the town has a total area of 0.5 square miles (1.3 km^{2}), of which 0.5 square miles (1.3 km^{2}) is land and 1.89% is water.

== Demographics ==
Historical population
Census	Pop.	Note	%±
1970	87		—
1980	154		77.0%
1990	88		−42.9%
2000	100		13.6%
2010	85		−15.0%
2020	73		−14.1%
U.S. Decennial Census

=== 2020 census ===
As of the 2020 census, Paradise Hill had a population of 73. The median age was 32.3 years. 46.6% of residents were under the age of 18 and 24.7% of residents were 65 years of age or older. For every 100 females there were 143.3 males, and for every 100 females age 18 and over there were 95.0 males age 18 and over.

0.0% of residents lived in urban areas, while 100.0% lived in rural areas.

There were 13 households in Paradise Hill, of which 15.4% had children under the age of 18 living in them. Of all households, 53.8% were married-couple households, 30.8% were households with a male householder and no spouse or partner present, and 7.7% were households with a female householder and no spouse or partner present. About 23.1% of all households were made up of individuals and 0.0% had someone living alone who was 65 years of age or older.

There were 106 housing units, of which 87.7% were vacant. The homeowner vacancy rate was 23.5% and the rental vacancy rate was 100.0%.

Racial composition as of the 2020 census
Race	Number	Percent
White	49	67.1%
Black or African American	0	0.0%
American Indian and Alaska Native	7	9.6%
Asian	0	0.0%
Native Hawaiian and Other Pacific Islander	2	2.7%
Some other race	4	5.5%
Two or more races	11	15.1%
Hispanic or Latino (of any race)	4	5.5%

=== 2000 census ===
As of the census of 2000, there were 100 people, 45 households, and 31 families residing in the town. The population density was 191.6 inhabitants per square mile (74.0/km^{2}). There were 105 housing units at an average density of 201.2 per square mile (77.7/km^{2}). The racial makeup of the town was 76.00% White, 6.00% Native American, 1.00% from other races, and 17.00% from two or more races. Hispanic or Latino of any race were 4.00% of the population.

There were 45 households, out of which 22.2% had children under the age of 18 living with them, 64.4% were married couples living together, 4.4% had a female householder with no husband present, and 31.1% were non-families. 28.9% of all households were made up of individuals, and 11.1% had someone living alone who was 65 years of age or older. The average household size was 2.22 and the average family size was 2.74.

In the town, the population was spread out, with 17.0% under the age of 18, 5.0% from 18 to 24, 22.0% from 25 to 44, 27.0% from 45 to 64, and 29.0% who were 65 years of age or older. The median age was 48 years. For every 100 females, there were 78.6 males. For every 100 females age 18 and over, there were 80.4 males.

The median income for a household in the town was $30,500, and the median income for a family was $38,125. Males had a median income of $43,333 versus $48,750 for females. The per capita income for the town was $22,835. There were 8.0% of families and 12.4% of the population living below the poverty line, including no under eighteens and 7.4% of those over 64.
