= Marble City, Oklahoma =

Marble City, Oklahoma ᎦᏓᏲᏍᏗ (Cherokee)
- Town
- Nickname: "Marble"
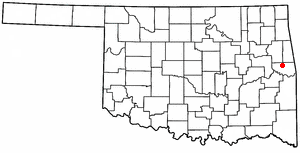
- Location of Marble City, Oklahoma
- Coordinates: 35°32′31″N 94°49′18″W
- Country: United States
- State: Oklahoma
- County: Sequoyah
- Named after: nearby marble deposits

Area
  - Total: 0.41 sq mi (1.05 km^{2})
  - Land: 0.41 sq mi (1.05 km^{2})
  - Water: 0 sq mi (0.00 km^{2})
- Elevation: 623 ft (190 m)

Population (2020)
  - Total: 186
  - Density: 457.7/sq mi (176.73/km^{2})
- Time zone: UTC-6 (Central (CST))
  - Summer (DST): UTC-5 (CDT)
- ZIP code: 74945
- Area codes: 539/918
- FIPS code: 40-46450
- GNIS feature ID: 2408174

Town of Marble City (often simply called Marble) is a town in Sequoyah County, Oklahoma, United States. It is part of the Fort Smith, Arkansas-Oklahoma Metropolitan Statistical Area. As of the 2020 census, Marble City had a population of 186.

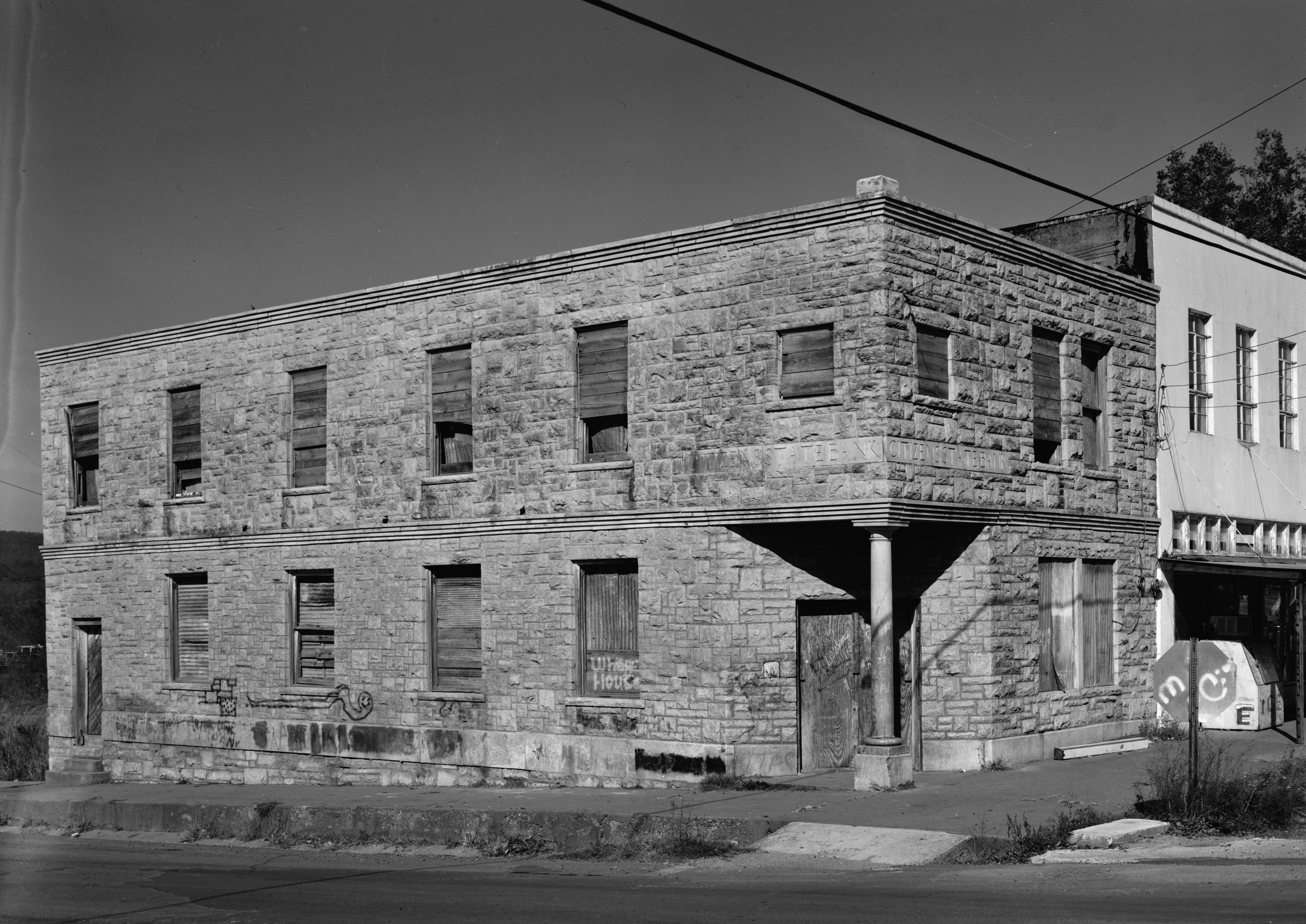
Citizen's State Bank in Marble City, October 1979

== History ==
The area around what is now the Town of Marble City was considered part of Lovely County, Arkansas Territory until 1829. In that year, the Federal Government began moving the Western Cherokees from other parts of Arkansas Territory into this area, then called Nicksville. Non-Indian settlers were ordered to vacate, and the Arkansas Territorial Legislature ended its claim to the land. Dwight Mission took over Nicksville. The area became part of Indian Territory.

A post office named Kidron was established in this area in 1835, to serve the Cherokee settlers in this area. The office moved to another location in 1858, where it was named Marble Salt Works. Another Kidron post office opened near Dwight Mission in 1859, but was discontinued in 1869. In 1869, the Post Office opened a new location named Kedron. By 1895, when commercial-scale quarrying of marble began in this area, the Kansas City, Pittsburg and Gulf Railroad (later known as the Kansas City Southern Railway) laid tracks through the area, the Kedron post office moved closer to the railroad and a marble quarry, and was renamed as Marble. The name was chosen because of its proximity to Oklahoma's only true marble outcrops. Commercial quarrying began there in 1895. It was renamed Marble City in 1906. The Ozark Marble Company operated the quarry from 1906 to 1914, producing material for building construction.

One major project using marble from Marble City was the Oklahoma City's Pioneer Telephone Building. Another was the Administration Hall at Rice Institute, which is now Lovett Hall at Rice University: it is made of red St. Joe bricks made in Louisiana with clay from Buffalo Bayou in Houston, Texas; pink granite from Llano, Texas; and gray marble from Marble City, Oklahoma.

The town's marble industry flourished until about 1916. The town shrunk, but regrew in the 1950s until experiencing another shrinkage in the 1960s when automobiles increased in popularity in the rural area. Drug epidemics increased in the 1980s and by 2015 every business in town had shut down. In 2025, the town has several churches, a Cherokee Nation community center, and Marble City Public Schools which serves pre-K thru 8th grade.

Watie Davault served as mayor of Marble City for 47 years, when he retired in 1961.

== Geography ==
Town of Marble City is approximately 9 miles (14 km) north of Sallisaw.

According to the United States Census Bureau, the town has a total area of 0.4 square miles (1.0 km^{2}), all land.

== Demographics ==
Historical population
Census	Pop.	Note	%±
1910	342		—
1920	344		0.6%
1930	168		−51.2%
1940	214		27.4%
1950	285		33.2%
1960	271		−4.9%
1970	299		10.3%
1980	294		−1.7%
1990	232		−21.1%
2000	242		4.3%
2010	263		8.7%
2020	186		−29.3%
U.S. Decennial Census

=== 2020 census ===
As of the 2020 census, Marble City had a population of 186. The median age was 36.8 years. 29.6% of residents were under the age of 18 and 18.3% of residents were 65 years of age or older. For every 100 females there were 89.8 males, and for every 100 females age 18 and over there were 101.5 males age 18 and over.

0.0% of residents lived in urban areas, while 100.0% lived in rural areas.

There were 68 households in Marble City, of which 44.1% had children under the age of 18 living in them. Of all households, 45.6% were married-couple households, 17.6% were households with a male householder and no spouse or partner present, and 29.4% were households with a female householder and no spouse or partner present. About 20.6% of all households were made up of individuals and 10.3% had someone living alone who was 65 years of age or older.

There were 78 housing units, of which 12.8% were vacant. The homeowner vacancy rate was 0.0% and the rental vacancy rate was 0.0%.

Racial composition as of the 2020 census
Race	Number	Percent
White	60	32.3%
Black or African American	1	0.5%
American Indian and Alaska Native	105	56.5%
Asian	0	0.0%
Native Hawaiian and Other Pacific Islander	0	0.0%
Some other race	2	1.1%
Two or more races	18	9.7%
Hispanic or Latino (of any race)	8	4.3%

=== 2000 census ===
As of the census of 2000, there were 242 people, 73 households, and 58 families residing in the town. The population density was 597.4 inhabitants per square mile (230.7/km^{2}). There were 88 housing units at an average density of 217.2 per square mile (83.9/km^{2}). The racial makeup of the town was 30.99% White, 66.53% Native American, and 2.48% from two or more races. Hispanic or Latino of any race were 3.31% of the population.

There were 73 households, out of which 32.9% had children under the age of 18 living with them, 42.5% were married couples living together, 34.2% had a female householder with no husband present, and 20.5% were non-families. 19.2% of all households were made up of individuals, and 9.6% had someone living alone who was 65 years of age or older. The average household size was 3.32 and the average family size was 3.78.

In the town, the population was spread out, with 35.1% under the age of 18, 8.3% from 18 to 24, 26.0% from 25 to 44, 18.2% from 45 to 64, and 12.4% who were 65 years of age or older. The median age was 28 years. For every 100 females, there were 105.1 males. For every 100 females age 18 and over, there were 93.8 males.

The median income for a household in the town was $17,375, and the median income for a family was $16,250. Males had a median income of $20,938 versus $18,333 for females. The per capita income for the town was $9,115. About 39.7% of families and 39.8% of the population were below the poverty line, including 58.8% of those under the age of eighteen and 26.1% of those 65 or over.

== NRHP Sites ==
The Citizens State Bank is located in Town of Marble City. The Dwight Presbyterian Mission is about one mile south of town. Sequoyah's Cabin is also a few miles east of town.
