= Connors State College =

Community College in Warner and Muskogee, Oklahoma, U.S.

Coordinates: 35°29′32″N 95°19′13″W

- Other name: CSC
- Former name: Connors State School of Agriculture
- Motto: Building Futures One at a Time
- Type: Public community college
- Established: 1908
- Academic affiliations: Oklahoma Agricultural & Mechanical Colleges
- President: Ronald Ramming
- Students: 2,098 (fall 2023)
- Location: Warner, Oklahoma, U.S.
- Campus: Rural
- Colors: Orange, black, white
- Sporting affiliations: NJCAA Division I
- Mascot: Cowboys
- Website: connorsstate.edu

Connors State College is a public community college in Warner and Muskogee, Oklahoma, United States.

== History ==
The college was founded as an agricultural high school in 1908 and was quickly converted to a school of agriculture.

When Oklahoma became a state in 1907, the Oklahoma Constitution specified that the state should have an agricultural school in each of the State Supreme Court Judicial Districts. These schools would be granted at least 80 acres (32 ha), and be overseen by Oklahoma's Board of Agriculture. In the First Judicial District, Warner, Oklahoma vied with Muskogee as the school location. Led by State Senator Campbell Russell, Warner residents donated 160 acres (65 ha) for the school and Warner won the competition. The school was named in honor of John P. Connors, the Board of Agriculture's first president.

In March 1927, the Oklahoma Legislature made the school an accredited junior college and renamed it as Connors State Agricultural College. In 1941, the school was put under the oversight of newly created Oklahoma State System of Higher Education. In 1944, it was transferred to the Board of Regents for Agricultural and Mechanical Colleges. It was again renamed as Connors State College of Agriculture and Applied Science in 1967.

== Campuses ==
The college has two campuses, in Warner and Muskogee, Oklahoma. Connors State College Muskogee previously occupied the Charles Haskell building in downtown Muskogee. It closed in 2011, moving all classes to other properties in the area. In 2015 Connors State College open a brand new building at its Port Campus in Muskogee.

== Academics ==
The school offers certificates and associate degrees.

== Athletics ==
The Connors State athletic teams are called the Cowboys and Cowgirls. The college is a member of the National Junior College Athletic Association (NJCAA), primarily competing in the Bi-State Conference within the NJCAA Region 2.

Connors State competes in 11 intercollegiate varsity sports: Men's sports include baseball, basketball, cross country and soccer; while women's sports include basketball, cross country, soccer and softball; and co-ed sports include cheerleading, rodeo and shooting sports.

== Notable people ==
- Alan Hays - politician
- George Kottaras - professional baseball player
- Julio Lugo - professional baseball player
- Jordan Romano - professional baseball player
- Kayse Shrum - physician and academic administrator
- Phyllis Yargee, Cherokee Nation Tribal Councilor (2003–2007)

=== Former faculty ===
- Marlon Coleman, politician and Baptist minister

== Gallery ==
Connors State College, Warner Campus
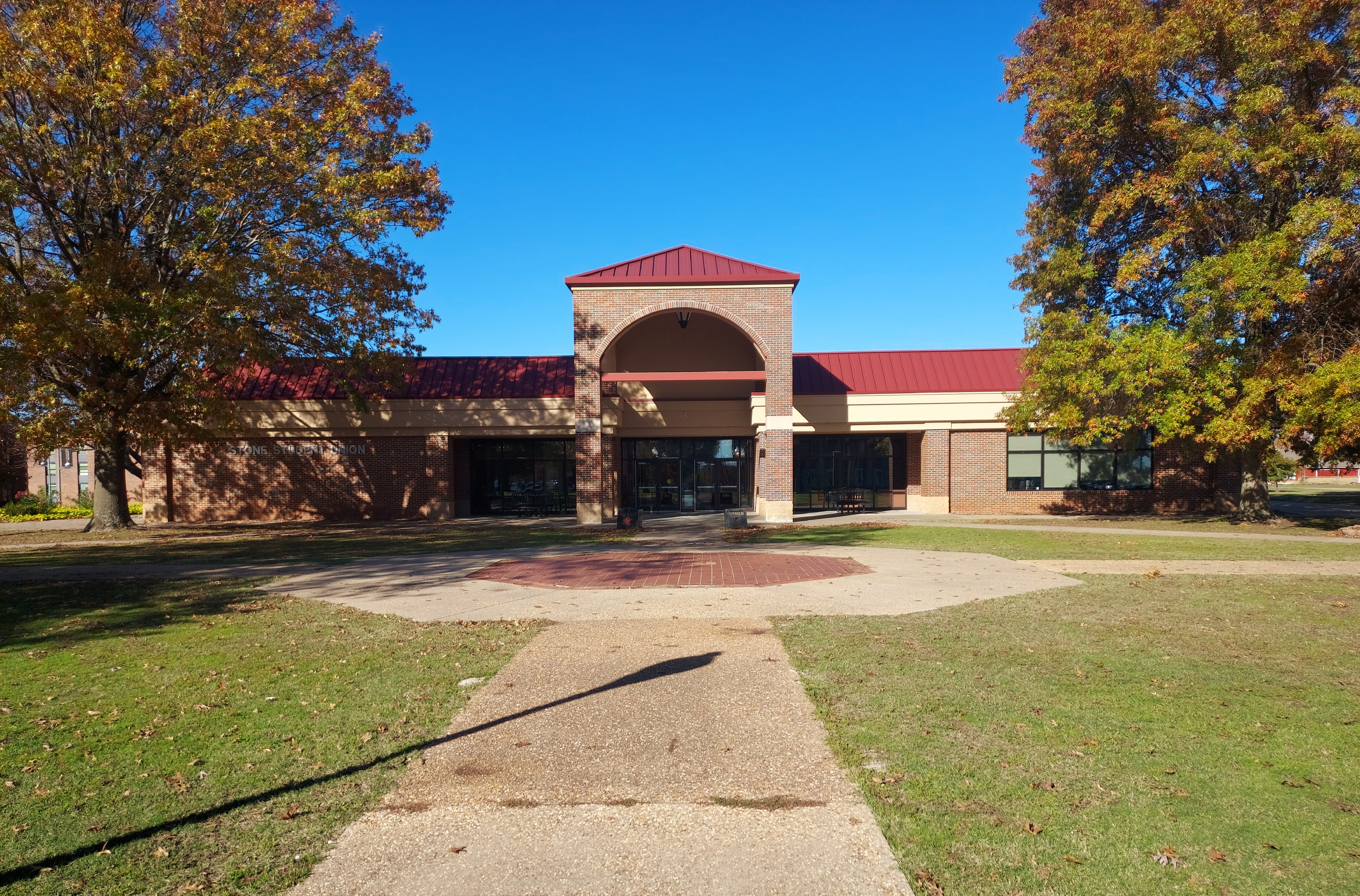
Stone Student Union at Connors State College

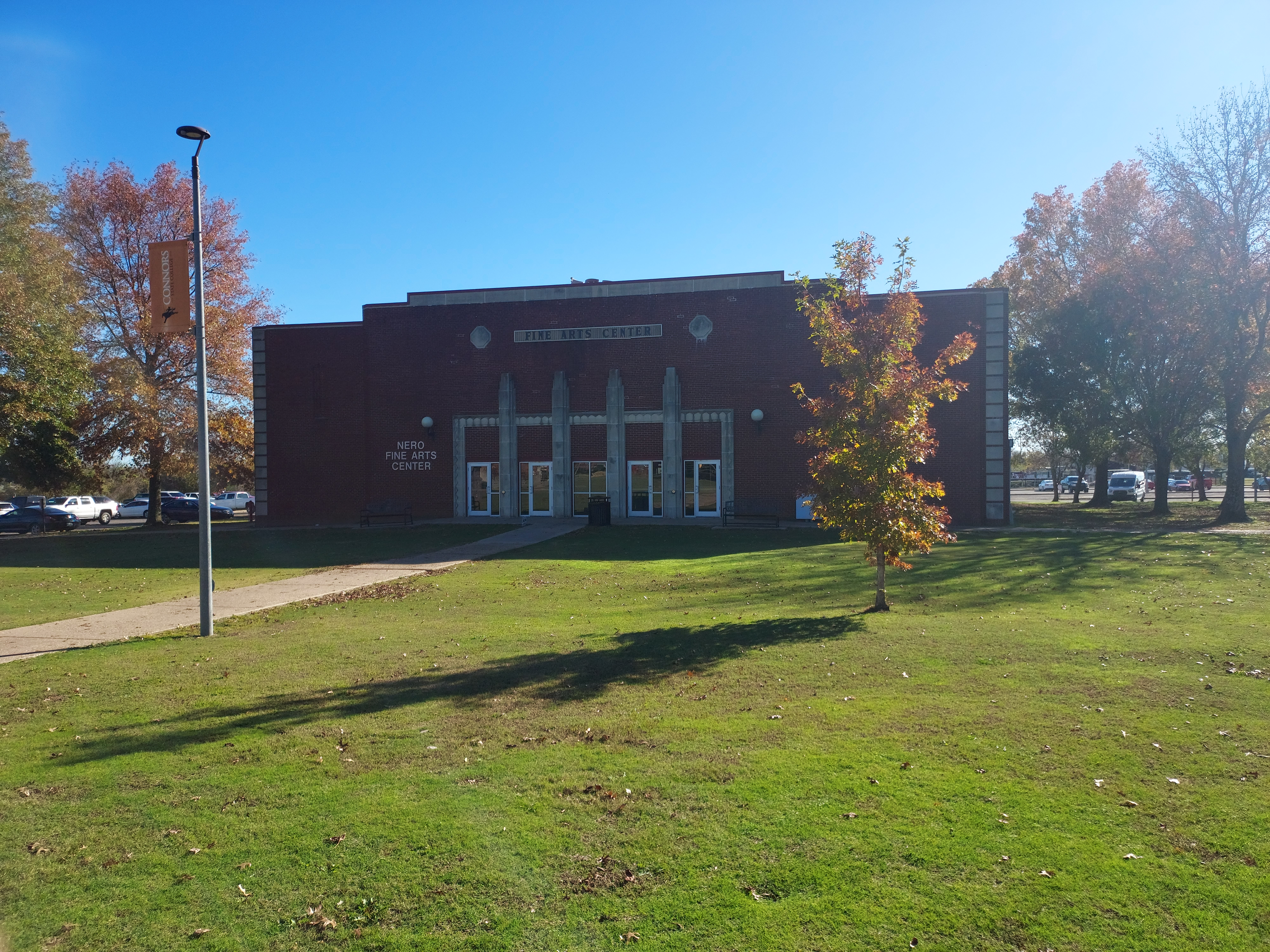
Fine Arts Center at Connors State College

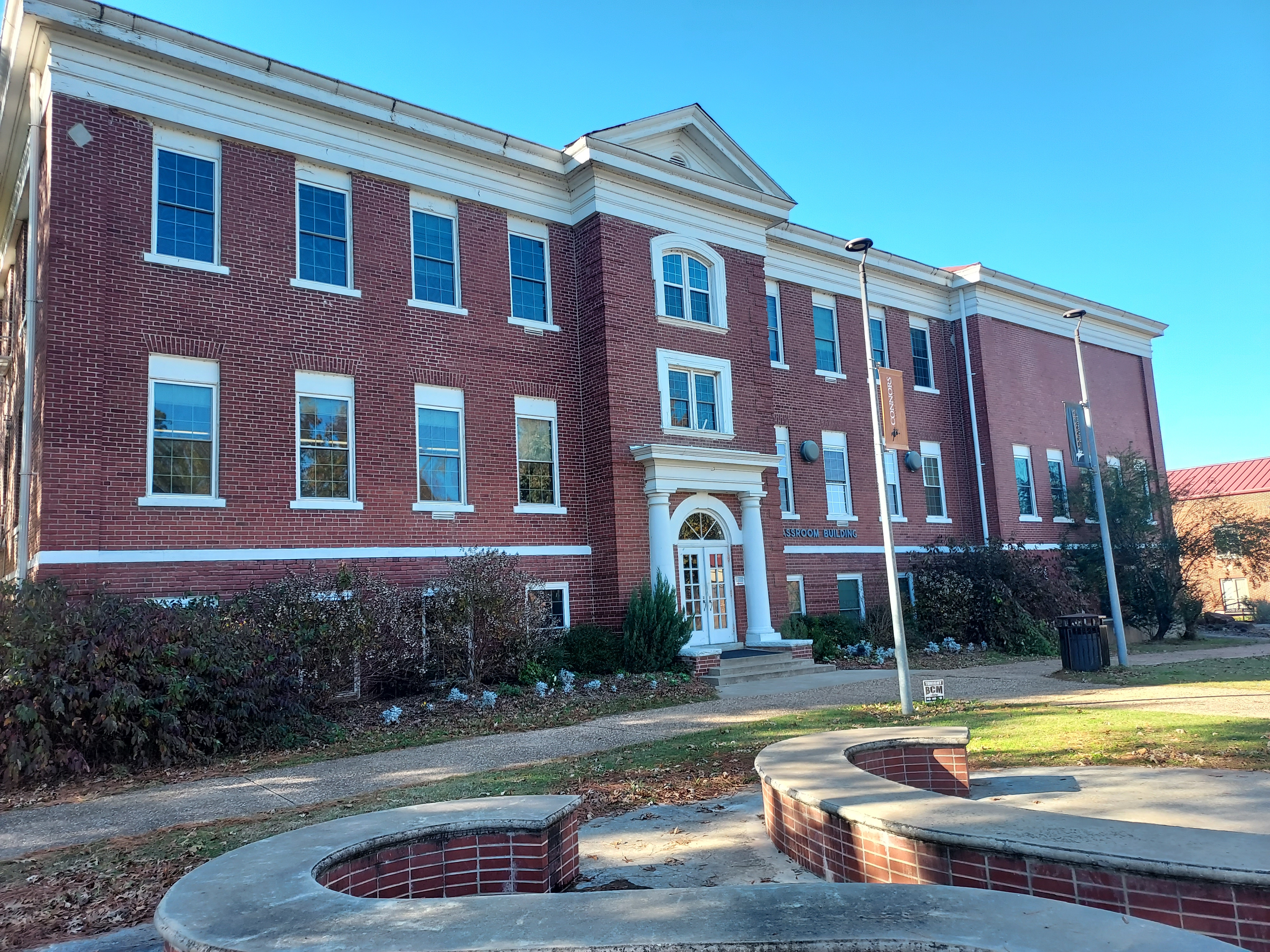
Classroom Building at Connors State College
