= Fort Smith metropolitan area =

Coordinates: 35°22′07″N 94°23′55″W

- Metropolitan Statistical Area
- Fort Smith, AR-OK; Metropolitan Statistical Area
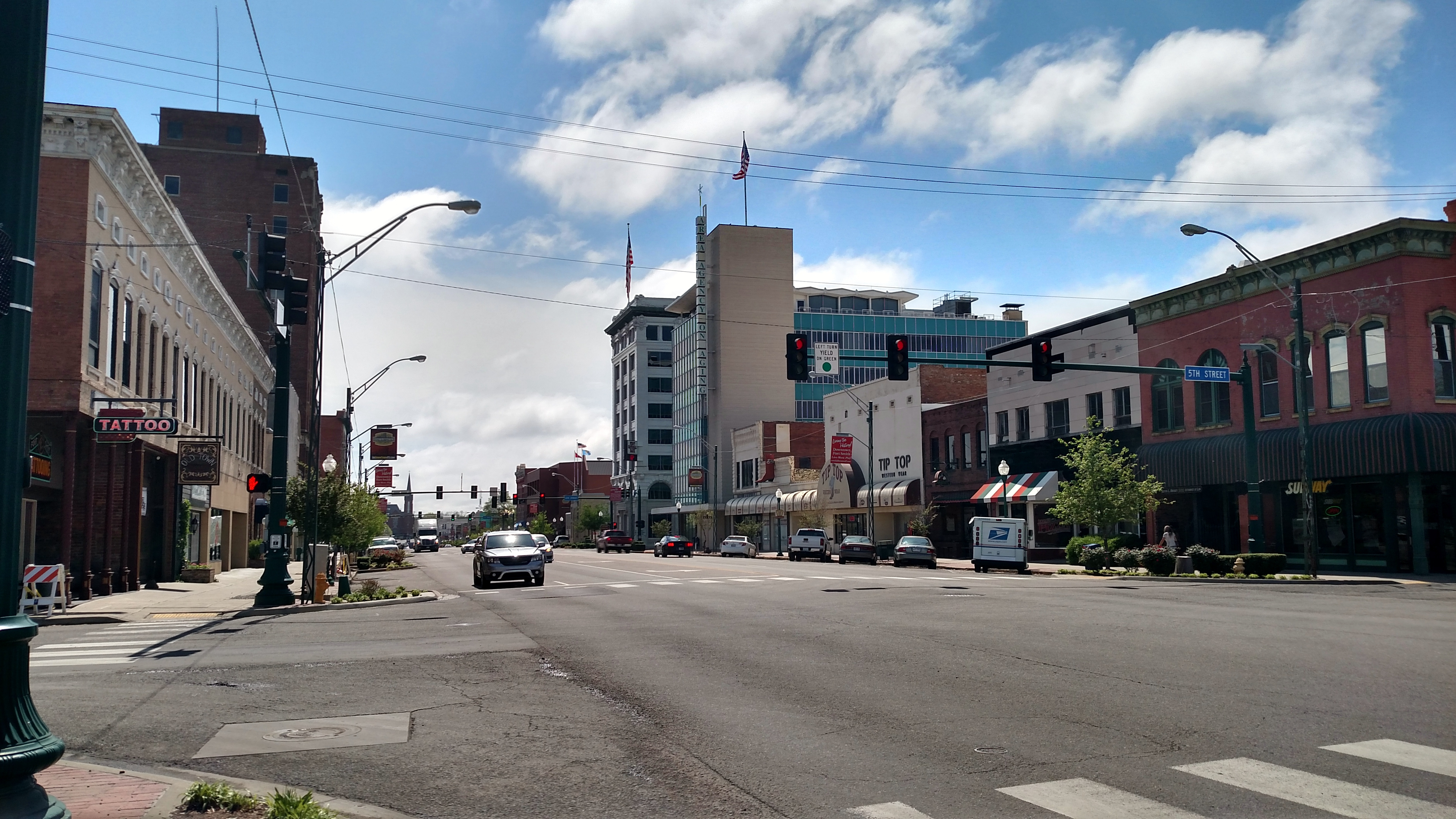
- Downtown Fort Smith
Components of the Fort Smith, AR-OK MSA
City of Fort Smith
City of Van Buren
Fort Smith MSA
- Country: United States
- State: Arkansas; Oklahoma
- Principal cities: Fort Smith

Area
  - MSA: 4,000 sq mi (10,000 km^{2})

Population (2022)
  - MSA: 250,368

GDP
  - MSA: $12.730 billion (2023)
  - Per capita: $50,845 (2023)
- Time zone: UTC-6 (CST)
  - Summer (DST): UTC-5 (CDT)

The Fort Smith Metropolitan Statistical Area, as defined by the United States Census Bureau, is a three-county area including two Arkansas counties and one Oklahoma county, and anchored by the city of Fort Smith, Arkansas. The total MSA population in 2000 was 273,170 people, estimated by the Bureau to have grown to 289,693 people by 2007.

Other major cities located within the area include Van Buren, Arkansas, Sallisaw, Oklahoma, and Poteau, Oklahoma.

== Definition ==
Constituent counties of the MSA include:

Arkansas

- Sebastian County
- Crawford County

Oklahoma

- Sequoyah County

=== History ===
The MSA designation included Franklin County, Arkansas between 2020 and 2023. The MSA was revised to remove Le Flore County, Oklahoma in 2023 based on the results of the 2020 Census.

== Geography ==
The Fort Smith MSA is predominantly located in the Arkansas River Valley region, an area generally defined as the area along the Arkansas River between the Ozark and Ouachita Mountains consisting of flat lowlands covered in fertile farmland and lakes periodically interrupted by high peaks. Sequoyah County is within the Green Country region defined by the Oklahoma Department of Tourism and Recreation.

=== Ecology ===
Ecologically, the majority of the three-county area is within the Arkansas Valley, a Level III ecoregion defined by the United States Environmental Protection Agency (EPA) parallel to the Arkansas River between the flat plains of western Oklahoma and the Arkansas Delta. The Arkansas Valley contains plains, hills, floodplains, terraces, and scattered mountains. Prior to the 19th century, uplands were dominated by a mix of forest, woodland, savanna, and prairie whereas floodplains and lower terraces were covered by bottomland deciduous forest. Today, less rugged upland areas have been cleared for pastureland or hayland. Poultry and livestock farming are important land uses. Water quality is generally good and influenced more by land use activities than by soils or geology; average stream gradients and dissolved oxygen levels are lower in the Arkansas Valley than in the Ouachita Mountains or Ozark Highlands, whereas turbidity, total suspended solids, total organic carbon, total phosphorus, and biochemical oxygen demand values are typically higher. The Arkansas River is continuously turbid.

The northern halves of Crawford and Sequoyah counties are within the Ozark Highlands ecoregion. More sparsely populated than the flatter river valley, the Ozark Highlands contain many karst features. Cold, perennial, spring-fed streams occur. It is more rugged and wooded than the lithologically similar Springfield Plateau and the lithologically dissimilar Central Plateau. Potential natural vegetation is oak–hickory and oak–hickory–pine forests. Today, it remains dominated by forest and woodland. Logging, livestock farming, woodland grazing, recreation, quarrying, and housing are primary land uses.

Fort Smith MSA is centrally located within the Arkoma Basin.

== Communities ==
Communities are categorized based on their populations in the 2000 U.S. Census.

=== Places with more than 75,000 inhabitants ===
- Fort Smith, Arkansas (Principal city)

=== Places with 10,000 to 25,000 inhabitants ===
- Van Buren, Arkansas

=== Places with 1,000 to 10,000 inhabitants ===
- Alma, Arkansas
- Barling, Arkansas
- Cedarville, Arkansas
- Greenwood, Arkansas
- Lavaca, Arkansas
- Mansfield, Arkansas (partial)
- Mulberry, Arkansas
- Muldrow, Oklahoma
- Roland, Oklahoma
- Sallisaw, Oklahoma
- Vian, Oklahoma

=== Places with 500 to 1,000 inhabitants ===
- Bonanza, Arkansas
- Brent, Oklahoma (census-designated place)
- Brushy, Oklahoma (census-designated place)
- Carlisle, Oklahoma (census-designated place)
- Central City, Arkansas
- Dyer, Arkansas
- Gore, Oklahoma
- Hackett, Arkansas
- Hartford, Arkansas
- Howe, Oklahoma
- Huntington, Arkansas
- Kibler, Arkansas
- Mountainburg, Arkansas

=== Places with fewer than 500 inhabitants ===
- Akins, Oklahoma (census-designated place)
- Belfonte, Oklahoma (census-designated place)
- Cecil, Arkansas
- Chester, Arkansas
- Dwight Mission, Oklahoma (census-designated place)
- Evening Shade, Oklahoma (census-designated place)
- Flute Springs, Oklahoma (census-designated place)
- Gans, Oklahoma
- Long, Oklahoma (census-designated place)
- Marble City Community, Oklahoma (census-designated place)
- Marble City, Oklahoma
- McKey, Oklahoma (census-designated place)
- Midland, Arkansas
- Moffett, Oklahoma
- Notchietown, Oklahoma (census-designated place)
- Paradise Hill, Oklahoma
- Pinhook Corners, Oklahoma (census-designated place)
- Redbird Smith, Oklahoma (census-designated place)
- Remy, Oklahoma (census-designated place)
- Rudy, Arkansas
- Short, Oklahoma (census-designated place)
- Stony Point, Oklahoma (census-designated place)
- Sycamore, Sequoyah County, Oklahoma (census-designated place)

=== Unincorporated places ===
- Big Cedar, Oklahoma
- Dora, Arkansas
- Figure Five, Arkansas
- Muse, Oklahoma
- Skullyville, Oklahoma

== Largest cities in the MSA ==
City	County	State	Population (2007 est.)
Fort Smith	Sebastian	Arkansas	84,375
Van Buren	Crawford	Arkansas	22,001
Sallisaw	Sequoyah	Oklahoma	8,740
Greenwood	Sebastian	Arkansas	8,482
Alma	Crawford	Arkansas	4,948
Barling	Sebastian	Arkansas	4,439
Roland	Sequoyah	Oklahoma	3,258
Muldrow	Sequoyah	Oklahoma	3,168

== Demographics ==
Historical population
Census	Pop.	Note	%±
1910	150,991		—
1920	171,393		13.5%
1930	155,138		−9.5%
1940	171,416		10.5%
1950	154,336		−10.0%
1960	145,323		−5.8%
1970	171,722		18.2%
1980	218,216		27.1%
1990	234,078		7.3%
2000	273,170		16.7%
2010	248,208		−9.1%
2019 (est.)	250,368		0.9%
U.S. Decennial Census; 2019 Estimate

As of the census of 2000, there were 273,170 people, 104,506 households, and 75,005 families residing within the MSA. The racial makeup of the MSA was 82.78% White, 3.46% African American, 5.80% Native American, 1.80% Asian, 0.04% Pacific Islander, 2.26% from other races, and 3.87% from two or more races. Hispanic or Latino of any race were 4.54% of the population.

The median income for a household in the MSA was $30,500, and the median income for a family was $35,902. Males had a median income of $28,074 versus $20,182 for females. The per capita income for the MSA was $15,039.

County	State	Seat(s)	2025 estimate	2020 census	Change	Area	Density
Sebastian	Arkansas	Greenwood & Fort Smith	130,641	127,799	+2.22%	546 sq mi (1,414 km^{2})	234/sq mi (90/km^{2})
Crawford	Arkansas	Van Buren	62,657	60,133	+4.20%	604 sq mi (1,564 km^{2})	104/sq mi (40/km^{2})
Sequoyah	Oklahoma	Sallisaw	40,842	39,281	+3.97%	714 sq mi (1,849 km^{2})	57/sq mi (22/km^{2})
Total			234,140	227,213	+3.05%	1,864 sq mi (4,828 km^{2})	126/sq mi (48/km^{2})

== See also ==
- Arkansas statistical areas
- Oklahoma statistical areas
