= Carlisle, Oklahoma =

- Census-designated place
- Location within the state of Oklahoma
- Coordinates: 35°30′03″N 94°59′48″W
- Country: United States
- State: Oklahoma
- County: Sequoyah

Area
  - Total: 26.44 sq mi (68.47 km^{2})
  - Land: 26.34 sq mi (68.23 km^{2})
  - Water: 0.093 sq mi (0.24 km^{2})
- Elevation: 551 ft (168 m)

Population (2020)
  - Total: 483
  - Density: 18.3/sq mi (7.08/km^{2})
- Time zone: UTC-6 (Central (CST))
  - Summer (DST): UTC-5 (CST)
- FIPS code: 40-11975
- GNIS feature ID: 2407963

Carlisle is a census-designated place (CDP) in Sequoyah County, Oklahoma, United States. It is part of the Fort Smith, Arkansas-Oklahoma Metropolitan Statistical Area. As of the 2020 census, Carlisle had a population of 483.

== Geography ==
According to the United States Census Bureau, the CDP has a total area of 26.4 square miles (68.4 km^{2}), of which 26.3 square miles (68.2 km^{2}) is land and 0.077 square miles (0.2 km^{2}), or 0.35%, is water.

== Demographics ==
Historical population
Census	Pop.	Note	%±
2000	649		—
2010	606		−6.6%
2020	483		−20.3%
U.S. Decennial Census

=== 2020 census ===
As of the 2020 census, Carlisle had a population of 483. The median age was 47.3 years. 21.7% of residents were under the age of 18 and 22.8% of residents were 65 years of age or older. For every 100 females there were 155.6 males, and for every 100 females age 18 and over there were 142.3 males age 18 and over.

0.0% of residents lived in urban areas, while 100.0% lived in rural areas.

There were 184 households in Carlisle, of which 28.3% had children under the age of 18 living in them. Of all households, 52.2% were married-couple households, 13.6% were households with a male householder and no spouse or partner present, and 26.6% were households with a female householder and no spouse or partner present. About 20.7% of all households were made up of individuals and 10.3% had someone living alone who was 65 years of age or older.

There were 216 housing units, of which 14.8% were vacant. The homeowner vacancy rate was 0.0% and the rental vacancy rate was 0.0%.

Racial composition as of the 2020 census
Race	Number	Percent
White	263	54.5%
Black or African American	6	1.2%
American Indian and Alaska Native	135	28.0%
Asian	5	1.0%
Native Hawaiian and Other Pacific Islander	0	0.0%
Some other race	13	2.7%
Two or more races	61	12.6%
Hispanic or Latino (of any race)	21	4.3%

=== 2000 census ===
As of the census of 2000, there were 649 people, 233 households, and 178 families residing in the CDP. The population density was 24.6 inhabitants per square mile (9.5/km^{2}). There were 260 housing units at an average density of 9.9 per square mile (3.8/km^{2}). The racial makeup of the CDP was 66.72% White, 3.24% Black or African American, 23.73% Native American, 0.31% Asian, 0.15% from other races, and 5.86% from two or more races. Hispanic or Latino of any race were 2.47% of the population.

There were 233 households, out of which 33.9% had children under the age of 18 living with them, 60.1% were married couples living together, 9.4% had a female householder with no husband present, and 23.6% were non-families. 18.5% of all households were made up of individuals, and 7.7% had someone living alone who was 65 years of age or older. The average household size was 2.79 and the average family size was 3.14.

In the CDP, the population was spread out, with 28.5% under the age of 18, 6.0% from 18 to 24, 25.4% from 25 to 44, 25.1% from 45 to 64, and 14.9% who were 65 years of age or older. The median age was 39 years. For every 100 females, there were 93.2 males. For every 100 females age 18 and over, there were 95.0 males.

The median income for a household in the CDP was $22,109, and the median income for a family was $30,500. Males had a median income of $25,809 versus $37,188 for females. The per capita income for the CDP was $14,798. About 23.1% of families and 28.3% of the population were below the poverty line, including 43.2% of those under age 18 and 17.1% of those age 65 or over.
