= Stony Point, Oklahoma =

Rocky Point, Oklahoma
- CDP
- Location within the state of Oklahoma
- Coordinates: 35°35′45″N 94°39′47″W
- Country: United States
- State: Oklahoma
- County: Sequoyah

Area
  - Total: 22.72 sq mi (58.85 km^{2})
  - Land: 22.68 sq mi (58.75 km^{2})
  - Water: 0.039 sq mi (0.10 km^{2})
- Elevation: 1,322 ft (403 m)

Population (2020)
  - Total: 176
  - Density: 7.8/sq mi (3/km^{2})
- Time zone: UTC-6 (Central (CST))
  - Summer (DST): UTC-5 (CDT)
- FIPS code: 40-70575
- GNIS feature ID: 1853484

Rocky Point (Cherokee: ᏅᏯ ᏗᏬᏴᏌᏛ) is a census-designated place (CDP) in Sequoyah County, Oklahoma, United States. It is part of the Fort Smith, Arkansas-Oklahoma Metropolitan Statistical Area. The population was 177 at the 2000 census.

== Geography ==
According to the United States Census Bureau, the CDP has a total area of 22.9 square miles (59 km^{2}), of which 22.8 square miles (59 km^{2}) is land and 0.04 square miles (0.10 km^{2}) (0.09%) is water.

== Demographics ==
Historical population
Census	Pop.	Note	%±
2020	176		—
U.S. Decennial Census

As of the census of 2000, there were 177 people, 66 households, and 54 families residing in the CDP. The population density was 7.7 inhabitants per square mile (3.0/km^{2}). There were 88 housing units at an average density of 3.9 per square mile (1.5/km^{2}). The racial makeup of the CDP was 55.93% White, 27.68% Native American, and 16.38% from two or more races. Hispanic or Latino of any race were 1.69% of the population.

There were 66 households, out of which 33.3% had children under the age of 18 living with them, 65.2% were married couples living together, 13.6% had a female householder with no husband present, and 16.7% were non-families. 15.2% of all households were made up of individuals, and 7.6% had someone living alone who was 65 years of age or older. The average household size was 2.68 and the average family size was 2.93.

In the CDP, the population was spread out, with 25.4% under the age of 18, 7.3% from 18 to 24, 28.8% from 25 to 44, 24.9% from 45 to 64, and 13.6% who were 65 years of age or older. The median age was 38 years. For every 100 females, there were 115.9 males. For every 100 females age 18 and over, there were 109.5 males.

The median income for a household in the CDP was $28,750, and the median income for a family was $33,125. Males had a median income of $26,667 versus $22,500 for females. The per capita income for the CDP was $11,652. About 23.0% of families and 27.4% of the population were below the poverty line, including 42.5% of those under the age of eighteen and 50.0% of those 65 or over.
