= Liberty, Sequoyah County, Oklahoma =

Liberty, Oklahoma
- Unincorporated community
- Location within Oklahoma Location within the United States
- Coordinates: 35°27′56″N 94°32′39″W
- Country: United States
- State: Oklahoma
- County: Sequoyah

Area
  - Total: 2.325 sq mi (6.02 km^{2})
  - Land: 2.318 sq mi (6.00 km^{2})
  - Water: 0.007 sq mi (0.018 km^{2})
- Elevation: 830 ft (250 m)

Population (2010)
  - Total: 220
  - Density: 95/sq mi (37/km^{2})
- Time zone: UTC-6 (Central (CST))
  - Summer (DST): UTC-5 (CDT)
- Area codes: 918 & 539
- GNIS feature ID: 2584384

Liberty is an unincorporated community and census-designated place in Sequoyah County, Oklahoma, United States. Its population was 220 as of the 2010 census.

Liberty had a post office from August 24, 1914, until August 15, 1927.

== Geography ==
According to the U.S. Census Bureau, the community has an area of 2.325 square miles (6.02 km^{2}); 2.318 square miles (6.00 km^{2}) of its area is land, and 0.007 square miles (0.018 km^{2}) is water.

== Demographics ==
=== 2020 census ===
As of the 2020 census, Liberty had a population of 214. The median age was 47.8 years. 17.8% of residents were under the age of 18 and 25.2% of residents were 65 years of age or older. For every 100 females there were 96.3 males, and for every 100 females age 18 and over there were 93.4 males age 18 and over.

0.0% of residents lived in urban areas, while 100.0% lived in rural areas.

There were 98 households in Liberty, of which 29.6% had children under the age of 18 living in them. Of all households, 32.7% were married-couple households, 19.4% were households with a male householder and no spouse or partner present, and 37.8% were households with a female householder and no spouse or partner present. About 41.8% of all households were made up of individuals and 24.5% had someone living alone who was 65 years of age or older.

There were 98 housing units, of which 0.0% were vacant. The homeowner vacancy rate was 0.0% and the rental vacancy rate was 0.0%.

Racial composition as of the 2020 census
Race	Number	Percent
White	131	61.2%
Black or African American	0	0.0%
American Indian and Alaska Native	39	18.2%
Asian	0	0.0%
Native Hawaiian and Other Pacific Islander	0	0.0%
Some other race	0	0.0%
Two or more races	44	20.6%
Hispanic or Latino (of any race)	12	5.6%

== Education ==
The school, Liberty School, made local news after the Sandy Hook shooting in 2013 by installing bomb-resistant glass in its windows and doors as a security measure. The school provides education for children in grades K - 8.
