= Long, Oklahoma =

- CDP
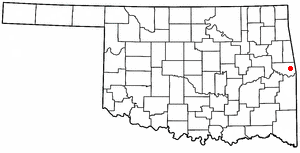
- Location of Long, Oklahoma
- Coordinates: 35°29′57″N 94°32′49″W
- Country: United States
- State: Oklahoma
- County: Sequoyah

Area
  - Total: 7.63 sq mi (19.77 km^{2})
  - Land: 7.61 sq mi (19.72 km^{2})
  - Water: 0.019 sq mi (0.05 km^{2})
- Elevation: 758 ft (231 m)

Population (2020)
  - Total: 408
  - Density: 53.6/sq mi (20.69/km^{2})
- Time zone: UTC-6 (Central (CST))
  - Summer (DST): UTC-5 (CDT)
- FIPS code: 40-43900
- GNIS feature ID: 2408126

Long is a census-designated place (CDP) in Sequoyah County, Oklahoma, United States. It is part of the Fort Smith, Arkansas-Oklahoma Metropolitan Statistical Area. As of the 2020 census, Long had a population of 408.

The post office existed from August 22, 1894, until April 15, 1937, with William J. Webb as the first postmaster. Long had 130 residents per the 1905 Territorial Census.

The community was named for Cherokee leader Peter Long.

== Geography ==
According to the United States Census Bureau, the CDP has a total area of 7.7 square miles (20 km^{2}), all land.

== Demographics ==
Historical population
Census	Pop.	Note	%±
2020	408		—
U.S. Decennial Census

=== 2020 census ===
As of the 2020 census, Long had a population of 408. The median age was 38.5 years. 27.7% of residents were under the age of 18 and 26.7% of residents were 65 years of age or older. For every 100 females there were 102.0 males, and for every 100 females age 18 and over there were 107.7 males age 18 and over.

0.0% of residents lived in urban areas, while 100.0% lived in rural areas.

There were 155 households in Long, of which 29.0% had children under the age of 18 living in them. Of all households, 56.8% were married-couple households, 21.3% were households with a male householder and no spouse or partner present, and 16.8% were households with a female householder and no spouse or partner present. About 25.2% of all households were made up of individuals and 11.6% had someone living alone who was 65 years of age or older.

There were 174 housing units, of which 10.9% were vacant. The homeowner vacancy rate was 0.8% and the rental vacancy rate was 0.0%.

Racial composition as of the 2020 census
Race	Number	Percent
White	262	64.2%
Black or African American	0	0.0%
American Indian and Alaska Native	85	20.8%
Asian	2	0.5%
Native Hawaiian and Other Pacific Islander	0	0.0%
Some other race	5	1.2%
Two or more races	54	13.2%
Hispanic or Latino (of any race)	26	6.4%

=== 2000 census ===
As of the census of 2000, there were 363 people, 125 households, and 100 families residing in the CDP. The population density was 47.5 inhabitants per square mile (18.3/km^{2}). There were 140 housing units at an average density of 18.3 per square mile (7.1/km^{2}). The racial makeup of the CDP was 67.77% White, 17.36% Native American, 0.28% Pacific Islander, 0.28% from other races, and 14.33% from two or more races. Hispanic or Latino of any race were 1.10% of the population.

There were 125 households, out of which 41.6% had children under the age of 18 living with them, 64.0% were married couples living together, 7.2% had a female householder with no husband present, and 20.0% were non-families. 16.8% of all households were made up of individuals, and 7.2% had someone living alone who was 65 years of age or older. The average household size was 2.90 and the average family size was 3.22.

In the CDP, the population was spread out, with 30.0% under the age of 18, 6.9% from 18 to 24, 30.3% from 25 to 44, 26.2% from 45 to 64, and 6.6% who were 65 years of age or older. The median age was 35 years. For every 100 females, there were 113.5 males. For every 100 females age 18 and over, there were 101.6 males.

The median income for a household in the CDP was $40,208, and the median income for a family was $41,597. Males had a median income of $26,964 versus $25,625 for females. The per capita income for the CDP was $13,759. About 11.4% of families and 24.5% of the population were below the poverty line, including 42.7% of those under age 18 and 41.4% of those age 65 or over.
