= Belfonte School District =

School district in Oklahoma

Location
- Muldrow, Oklahoma United States

District information
- Type: Public
- Grades: PK–8

Students and staff
- Students: 143 (2023–2024)
- Teachers: 11

Other information
- Website: www.belfonte.k12.ok.us

The Belfonte School District is a school district based in Muldrow, Oklahoma, United States. It contains two schools, Bell Elementary School and Belfonte Elementary School; that serve Pre-kindergarten–Grade 8.

During the 2023–2024 school year, 143 students attended one of two schools in the district.

Within Sequoyah County, the district includes a half of Belfonte, as well as all of Nicut and a part of Short.

Within Adair County, the district includes Elohim City and a portion of Bell.

== History ==
In 2010, the Bell Public School school district closed, with part of it consolidating into Belfonte Public School school district.

== See also ==
List of school districts in Oklahoma
