= McKey, Oklahoma =

- CDP
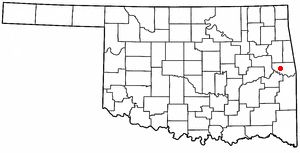
- Location of McKey, Oklahoma

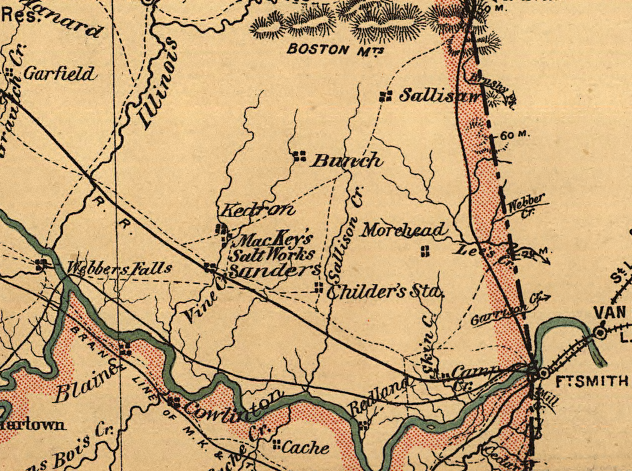
- Location of MacKey's Salt Works in the old Cherokee Nation
- Coordinates: 35°29′31″N 94°50′56″W
- Country: United States
- State: Oklahoma
- County: Sequoyah

Area
  - Total: 5.9 sq mi (15.4 km^{2})
  - Land: 5.8 sq mi (15.1 km^{2})
  - Water: 0.077 sq mi (0.2 km^{2})
- Elevation: 518 ft (158 m)

Population (2000)
  - Total: 135
  - Density: 23/sq mi (8.9/km^{2})
- Time zone: UTC-6 (Central (CST))
  - Summer (DST): UTC-5 (CDT)
- FIPS code: 40-45050
- GNIS feature ID: 2408200

McKey is a census-designated place (CDP) in Sequoyah County, Oklahoma, United States. It is part of the Fort Smith, Arkansas-Oklahoma Metropolitan Statistical Area. The population was 135 at the 2000 census. McKey was established on the Old Osage and Arkansas Valley Railroad near MacKey's Salt Works. The post office existed from March 13, 1891, until July 14, 1928.

== Geography ==
According to the United States Census Bureau, the CDP has a total area of 5.9 square miles (15 km^{2}), of which 5.8 square miles (15 km^{2}) is land and 0.1 square miles (0.26 km^{2}) (1.52%) is water.

== Demographics ==
As of the census of 2000, there were 135 people, 55 households, and 38 families residing in the CDP. The population density was 23.1 inhabitants per square mile (8.9/km^{2}). There were 61 housing units at an average density of 10.5 per square mile (4.1/km^{2}). The racial makeup of the CDP was 62.22% White, 21.48% Native American, and 16.30% from two or more races.

There were 55 households, out of which 36.4% had children under the age of 18 living with them, 61.8% were married couples living together, 5.5% had a female householder with no husband present, and 30.9% were non-families. 25.5% of all households were made up of individuals, and 12.7% had someone living alone who was 65 years of age or older. The average household size was 2.45 and the average family size was 2.92.

In the CDP, the population was spread out, with 26.7% under the age of 18, 1.5% from 18 to 24, 33.3% from 25 to 44, 25.2% from 45 to 64, and 13.3% who were 65 years of age or older. The median age was 36 years. For every 100 females, there were 104.5 males. For every 100 females age 18 and over, there were 94.1 males.

The median income for a household in the CDP was $24,732, and the median income for a family was $41,528. Males had a median income of $26,250 versus $16,250 for females. The per capita income for the CDP was $15,696. None of the population and none of the families were below the poverty line.
