= Remy, Oklahoma =

- CDP
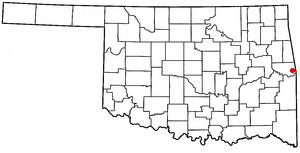
- Location of Remy, Oklahoma
- Coordinates: 35°27′25″N 94°30′53″W
- Country: United States
- State: Oklahoma
- County: Sequoyah

Area
  - Total: 12.92 sq mi (33.47 km^{2})
  - Land: 12.86 sq mi (33.32 km^{2})
  - Water: 0.058 sq mi (0.15 km^{2})
- Elevation: 889 ft (271 m)

Population (2020)
  - Total: 505
  - Density: 39.3/sq mi (15.16/km^{2})
- Time zone: UTC-6 (Central (CST))
  - Summer (DST): UTC-5 (CDT)
- FIPS code: 40-62875
- GNIS feature ID: 2409163

Remy is a census-designated place (CDP) in Sequoyah County, Oklahoma, United States. It is part of the Fort Smith, Arkansas-Oklahoma Metropolitan Statistical Area. As of the 2020 census, Remy had a population of 505.

== Geography ==
According to the United States Census Bureau, the CDP has a total area of 13.0 square miles (34 km^{2}), of which 12.9 square miles (33 km^{2}) is land and 0.08% is water.

== Demographics ==
Historical population
Census	Pop.	Note	%±
2020	505		—
U.S. Decennial Census

=== 2020 census ===
As of the 2020 census, Remy had a population of 505. The median age was 48.9 years. 19.0% of residents were under the age of 18 and 19.4% of residents were 65 years of age or older. For every 100 females there were 105.3 males, and for every 100 females age 18 and over there were 105.5 males age 18 and over.

0.0% of residents lived in urban areas, while 100.0% lived in rural areas.

There were 209 households in Remy, of which 32.1% had children under the age of 18 living in them. Of all households, 61.7% were married-couple households, 17.7% were households with a male householder and no spouse or partner present, and 17.7% were households with a female householder and no spouse or partner present. About 21.5% of all households were made up of individuals and 7.6% had someone living alone who was 65 years of age or older.

There were 224 housing units, of which 6.7% were vacant. The homeowner vacancy rate was 2.6% and the rental vacancy rate was 0.0%.

Racial composition as of the 2020 census
Race	Number	Percent
White	341	67.5%
Black or African American	6	1.2%
American Indian and Alaska Native	58	11.5%
Asian	2	0.4%
Native Hawaiian and Other Pacific Islander	1	0.2%
Some other race	10	2.0%
Two or more races	87	17.2%
Hispanic or Latino (of any race)	29	5.7%

=== 2000 census ===
As of the census of 2000, there were 411 people, 151 households, and 128 families residing in the CDP. The population density was 31.7 inhabitants per square mile (12.2/km^{2}). There were 164 housing units at an average density of 12.7 per square mile (4.9/km^{2}). The racial makeup of the CDP was 86.62% White, 9.49% Native American, 0.73% from other races, and 3.16% from two or more races. Hispanic or Latino of any race were 1.46% of the population.

There were 151 households, out of which 32.5% had children under the age of 18 living with them, 72.8% were married couples living together, 6.6% had a female householder with no husband present, and 14.6% were non-families. 11.9% of all households were made up of individuals, and 3.3% had someone living alone who was 65 years of age or older. The average household size was 2.72 and the average family size was 2.89.

In the CDP, the population was spread out, with 27.7% under the age of 18, 7.5% from 18 to 24, 25.5% from 25 to 44, 28.2% from 45 to 64, and 10.9% who were 65 years of age or older. The median age was 37 years. For every 100 females, there were 99.5 males. For every 100 females age 18 and over, there were 99.3 males.

The median income for a household in the CDP was $34,688, and the median income for a family was $38,125. Males had a median income of $31,761 versus $26,500 for females. The per capita income for the CDP was $16,869. About 12.5% of families and 10.4% of the population were below the poverty line, including 9.9% of those under age 18 and 10.0% of those age 65 or over.
