= Badger Lee, Oklahoma =

- Unincorporated community
- Location within Oklahoma Location within the United States
- Coordinates: 35°28′22″N 94°48′53″W
- Country: United States
- State: Oklahoma
- County: Sequoyah

Area
  - Total: 0.71 sq mi (1.83 km^{2})
  - Land: 0.71 sq mi (1.83 km^{2})
  - Water: 0.0039 sq mi (0.01 km^{2})
- Elevation: 617 ft (188 m)

Population (2020)
  - Total: 63
  - Density: 89.2/sq mi (34.45/km^{2})
- Time zone: UTC-6 (Central (CST))
  - Summer (DST): UTC-5 (CDT)
- Area codes: 918 & 539
- GNIS feature ID: 2584373

Badger Lee is an unincorporated community and census-designated place in Sequoyah County, Oklahoma, United States. As of the 2020 census, Badger Lee had a population of 63.

== Geography ==
According to the U.S. Census Bureau, the community has an area of 0.703 square miles (1.82 km^{2}); 0.701 square miles (1.82 km^{2}) of its area is land, and 0.002 square miles (0.0052 km^{2}) is water.

== Demographics ==
Historical population
Census	Pop.	Note	%±
2010	76		—
2020	63		−17.1%
U.S. Decennial Census

=== 2020 census ===
As of the 2020 census, Badger Lee had a population of 63. The median age was 35.5 years. 23.8% of residents were under the age of 18 and 22.2% of residents were 65 years of age or older. For every 100 females there were 125.0 males, and for every 100 females age 18 and over there were 108.7 males age 18 and over.

0.0% of residents lived in urban areas, while 100.0% lived in rural areas.

There were 22 households in Badger Lee, of which 68.2% had children under the age of 18 living in them. Of all households, 54.5% were married-couple households, 18.2% were households with a male householder and no spouse or partner present, and 27.3% were households with a female householder and no spouse or partner present. About 18.2% of all households were made up of individuals and 13.6% had someone living alone who was 65 years of age or older.

There were 30 housing units, of which 26.7% were vacant. The homeowner vacancy rate was 0.0% and the rental vacancy rate was 23.1%.

Racial composition as of the 2020 census
Race	Number	Percent
White	44	69.8%
Black or African American	1	1.6%
American Indian and Alaska Native	9	14.3%
Asian	0	0.0%
Native Hawaiian and Other Pacific Islander	0	0.0%
Some other race	0	0.0%
Two or more races	9	14.3%
Hispanic or Latino (of any race)	3	4.8%

=== 2010 census ===
At the 2010 census Badger Lee had a population of 76.
