= Short, Oklahoma =

- CDP
- Location within the state of Oklahoma
- Coordinates: 35°33′41″N 94°30′49″W
- Country: United States
- State: Oklahoma
- County: Sequoyah

Area
  - Total: 10.92 sq mi (28.27 km^{2})
  - Land: 10.81 sq mi (28.00 km^{2})
  - Water: 0.11 sq mi (0.28 km^{2})
- Elevation: 653 ft (199 m)

Population (2020)
  - Total: 290
  - Density: 26.8/sq mi (10.36/km^{2})
- Time zone: UTC-6 (Central (CST))
  - Summer (DST): UTC-5 (CDT)
- FIPS code: 40-67400
- GNIS feature ID: 2408732

Short is a census-designated place (CDP) in Sequoyah County, Oklahoma, United States. It is part of the Fort Smith, Arkansas-Oklahoma Metropolitan Statistical Area. As of the 2020 census, Short had a population of 290.

== Geography ==
According to the United States Census Bureau, the CDP has a total area of 23.8 square miles (62 km^{2}), of which 23.8 square miles (62 km^{2}) is land and 0.1 square miles (0.26 km^{2}) (0.25%) is water.

== Demographics ==
Historical population
Census	Pop.	Note	%±
2020	290		—
U.S. Decennial Census

=== 2020 census ===
As of the 2020 census, Short had a population of 290. The median age was 43.8 years. 23.1% of residents were under the age of 18 and 22.8% of residents were 65 years of age or older. For every 100 females there were 88.3 males, and for every 100 females age 18 and over there were 93.9 males age 18 and over.

0.0% of residents lived in urban areas, while 100.0% lived in rural areas.

There were 114 households in Short, of which 20.2% had children under the age of 18 living in them. Of all households, 56.1% were married-couple households, 17.5% were households with a male householder and no spouse or partner present, and 21.9% were households with a female householder and no spouse or partner present. About 22.8% of all households were made up of individuals and 12.3% had someone living alone who was 65 years of age or older.

There were 129 housing units, of which 11.6% were vacant. The homeowner vacancy rate was 1.7% and the rental vacancy rate was 50.0%.

Racial composition as of the 2020 census
Race	Number	Percent
White	196	67.6%
Black or African American	1	0.3%
American Indian and Alaska Native	50	17.2%
Asian	1	0.3%
Native Hawaiian and Other Pacific Islander	0	0.0%
Some other race	1	0.3%
Two or more races	41	14.1%
Hispanic or Latino (of any race)	9	3.1%

=== 2000 census ===
As of the census of 2000, there were 328 people, 116 households, and 101 families residing in the CDP. The population density was 13.8 inhabitants per square mile (5.3/km^{2}). There were 143 housing units at an average density of 6.0 per square mile (2.3/km^{2}). The racial makeup of the CDP was 73.48% White, 22.87% Native American, 0.30% from other races, and 3.35% from two or more races. Hispanic or Latino of any race were 2.13% of the population.

There were 116 households, out of which 44.0% had children under the age of 18 living with them, 71.6% were married couples living together, 11.2% had a female householder with no husband present, and 12.9% were non-families. 12.1% of all households were made up of individuals, and 7.8% had someone living alone who was 65 years of age or older. The average household size was 2.83 and the average family size was 3.06.

In the CDP, the population was spread out, with 30.2% under the age of 18, 7.9% from 18 to 24, 25.6% from 25 to 44, 23.5% from 45 to 64, and 12.8% who were 65 years of age or older. The median age was 36 years. For every 100 females, there were 117.2 males. For every 100 females age 18 and over, there were 112.0 males.

The median income for a household in the CDP was $25,625, and the median income for a family was $25,938. Males had a median income of $26,042 versus $21,875 for females. The per capita income for the CDP was $9,613. About 29.2% of families and 31.6% of the population were below the poverty line, including 26.0% of those under age 18 and 35.3% of those age 65 or over.

== Education ==
Most of it is in the Muldrow Public Schools. A small part is in the Belfonte Public School school district.
