= Brushy, Oklahoma =

- CDP
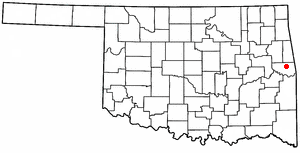
- Location of Brushy, Oklahoma
- Coordinates: 35°33′30″N 94°44′40″W
- Country: United States
- State: Oklahoma
- County: Sequoyah

Area
  - Total: 26.14 sq mi (67.69 km^{2})
  - Land: 26.02 sq mi (67.39 km^{2})
  - Water: 0.12 sq mi (0.30 km^{2})
- Elevation: 866 ft (264 m)

Population (2020)
  - Total: 811
  - Density: 31.2/sq mi (12.03/km^{2})
- Time zone: UTC-6 (Central (CST))
  - Summer (DST): UTC-5 (CDT)
- FIPS code: 40-09650
- GNIS feature ID: 2407914

Brushy is a census-designated place (CDP) in Sequoyah County, Oklahoma, United States, along U.S. Route 59 in the foothills of the Brushy Mountains. It is part of the Fort Smith, Arkansas-Oklahoma Metropolitan Statistical Area. As of the 2020 census, Brushy had a population of 811.

== Geography ==
According to the United States Census Bureau, Brushy has a total area of 26.1 square miles (68 km^{2}), of which 26.1 square miles (68 km^{2}) is land and 0.1 square miles (0.26 km^{2}) (0.23%) is water.

== Demographics ==
Historical population
Census	Pop.	Note	%±
2000	787		—
2010	900		14.4%
2020	811		−9.9%
U.S. Decennial Census

=== 2020 census ===
As of the 2020 census, Brushy had a population of 811. The median age was 46.4 years. 26.3% of residents were under the age of 18 and 19.4% of residents were 65 years of age or older. For every 100 females there were 101.2 males, and for every 100 females age 18 and over there were 106.2 males age 18 and over.

0.0% of residents lived in urban areas, while 100.0% lived in rural areas.

There were 294 households in Brushy, of which 29.6% had children under the age of 18 living in them. Of all households, 47.3% were married-couple households, 20.4% were households with a male householder and no spouse or partner present, and 22.8% were households with a female householder and no spouse or partner present. About 31.0% of all households were made up of individuals and 16.0% had someone living alone who was 65 years of age or older.

There were 331 housing units, of which 11.2% were vacant. The homeowner vacancy rate was 1.5% and the rental vacancy rate was 0.0%.

Racial composition as of the 2020 census
Race	Number	Percent
White	429	52.9%
Black or African American	0	0.0%
American Indian and Alaska Native	263	32.4%
Asian	7	0.9%
Native Hawaiian and Other Pacific Islander	0	0.0%
Some other race	8	1.0%
Two or more races	104	12.8%
Hispanic or Latino (of any race)	15	1.8%

=== 2000 census ===
As of the census of 2000, there were 787 people, 283 households, and 232 families residing in the CDP. The population density was 30.2 inhabitants per square mile (11.7/km^{2}). There were 319 housing units at an average density of 12.2 per square mile (4.7/km^{2}). The racial makeup of the CDP was 59.47% White, 0.13% African American, 25.41% Native American, 0.13% Pacific Islander, 1.14% from other races, and 13.72% from two or more races. Hispanic or Latino of any race were 2.54% of the population.

There were 283 households, out of which 36.7% had children under the age of 18 living with them, 69.6% were married couples living together, 9.5% had a female householder with no husband present, and 17.7% were non-families. 15.5% of all households were made up of individuals, and 7.1% had someone living alone who was 65 years of age or older. The average household size was 2.78 and the average family size was 3.10.

In the CDP, the population was spread out, with 26.0% under the age of 18, 8.0% from 18 to 24, 31.4% from 25 to 44, 24.8% from 45 to 64, and 9.8% who were 65 years of age or older. The median age was 36 years. For every 100 females, there were 106.6 males. For every 100 females age 18 and over, there were 104.2 males.

The median income for a household in the CDP was $26,853, and the median income for a family was $31,563. Males had a median income of $25,227 versus $18,125 for females. The per capita income for the CDP was $12,230. About 18.3% of families and 20.1% of the population were below the poverty line, including 21.5% of those under age 18 and 29.4% of those age 65 or over.
