= Evening Shade, Oklahoma =

Evening Shade
- CDP
- Location within the state of Oklahoma
- Coordinates: 35°37′10″N 94°54′37″W
- Country: United States
- State: Oklahoma
- County: Sequoyah

Area
  - Total: 13.36 sq mi (34.61 km^{2})
  - Land: 13.30 sq mi (34.44 km^{2})
  - Water: 0.066 sq mi (0.17 km^{2})
- Elevation: 863 ft (263 m)

Population (2020)
  - Total: 378
  - Density: 28.4/sq mi (10.98/km^{2})
- Time zone: UTC-6 (Central (CST))
  - Summer (DST): UTC-5 (CST)
- FIPS code: 40-24762
- GNIS feature ID: 2408096

Evening Shade is a census-designated place (CDP) in Sequoyah County, Oklahoma, United States. It is part of the Fort Smith, Arkansas-Oklahoma Metropolitan Statistical Area. As of the 2020 census, Evening Shade had a population of 378.

== Geography ==
According to the United States Census Bureau, the CDP has a total area of 14.7 square miles (38 km^{2}), all land.

== Demographics ==
Historical population
Census	Pop.	Note	%±
2010	359		—
2020	378		5.3%
U.S. Decennial Census

=== 2020 census ===
As of the 2020 census, Evening Shade had a population of 378. The median age was 49.8 years. 20.1% of residents were under the age of 18 and 22.2% of residents were 65 years of age or older. For every 100 females there were 90.9 males, and for every 100 females age 18 and over there were 88.8 males age 18 and over.

0.0% of residents lived in urban areas, while 100.0% lived in rural areas.

There were 146 households in Evening Shade, of which 17.1% had children under the age of 18 living in them. Of all households, 36.3% were married-couple households, 21.9% were households with a male householder and no spouse or partner present, and 39.0% were households with a female householder and no spouse or partner present. About 34.3% of all households were made up of individuals and 19.1% had someone living alone who was 65 years of age or older.

There were 233 housing units, of which 37.3% were vacant. The homeowner vacancy rate was 2.4% and the rental vacancy rate was 11.1%.

Racial composition as of the 2020 census
Race	Number	Percent
White	232	61.4%
Black or African American	5	1.3%
American Indian and Alaska Native	99	26.2%
Asian	1	0.3%
Native Hawaiian and Other Pacific Islander	0	0.0%
Some other race	2	0.5%
Two or more races	39	10.3%
Hispanic or Latino (of any race)	6	1.6%

=== 2010 census ===
As of the 2010 United States census, there were 359 people living in Evening Shade. The population density was 30.0 inhabitants per square mile (11.6/km^{2}). There were 295 housing units at an average density of 20.0 per square mile (7.7/km^{2}). The racial makeup of the CDP was 60.09% White, 26.76% Native American, 0.23% Pacific Islander, and 12.93% from two or more races.

There were 192 households, out of which 21.4% had children under the age of 18 living with them, 56.3% were married couples living together, 7.3% had a female householder with no husband present, and 31.8% were non-families. 26.0% of all households were made up of individuals, and 10.4% had someone living alone who was 65 years of age or older. The average household size was 2.30 and the average family size was 2.76.

In the CDP, the population was spread out, with 20.9% under the age of 18, 7.3% from 18 to 24, 24.7% from 25 to 44, 29.9% from 45 to 64, and 17.2% who were 65 years of age or older. The median age was 42 years. For every 100 females, there were 123.9 males. For every 100 females age 18 and over, there were 116.8 males.

The median income for a household in the CDP was $19,688, and the median income for a family was $29,706. Males had a median income of $31,563 versus $18,750 for females. The per capita income for the CDP was $11,672. About 24.7% of families and 35.3% of the population were below the poverty line, including 44.4% of those under age 18 and 16.1% of those age 65 or over.
