= Sequoyah County, Oklahoma =

County in Oklahoma, United States

- County
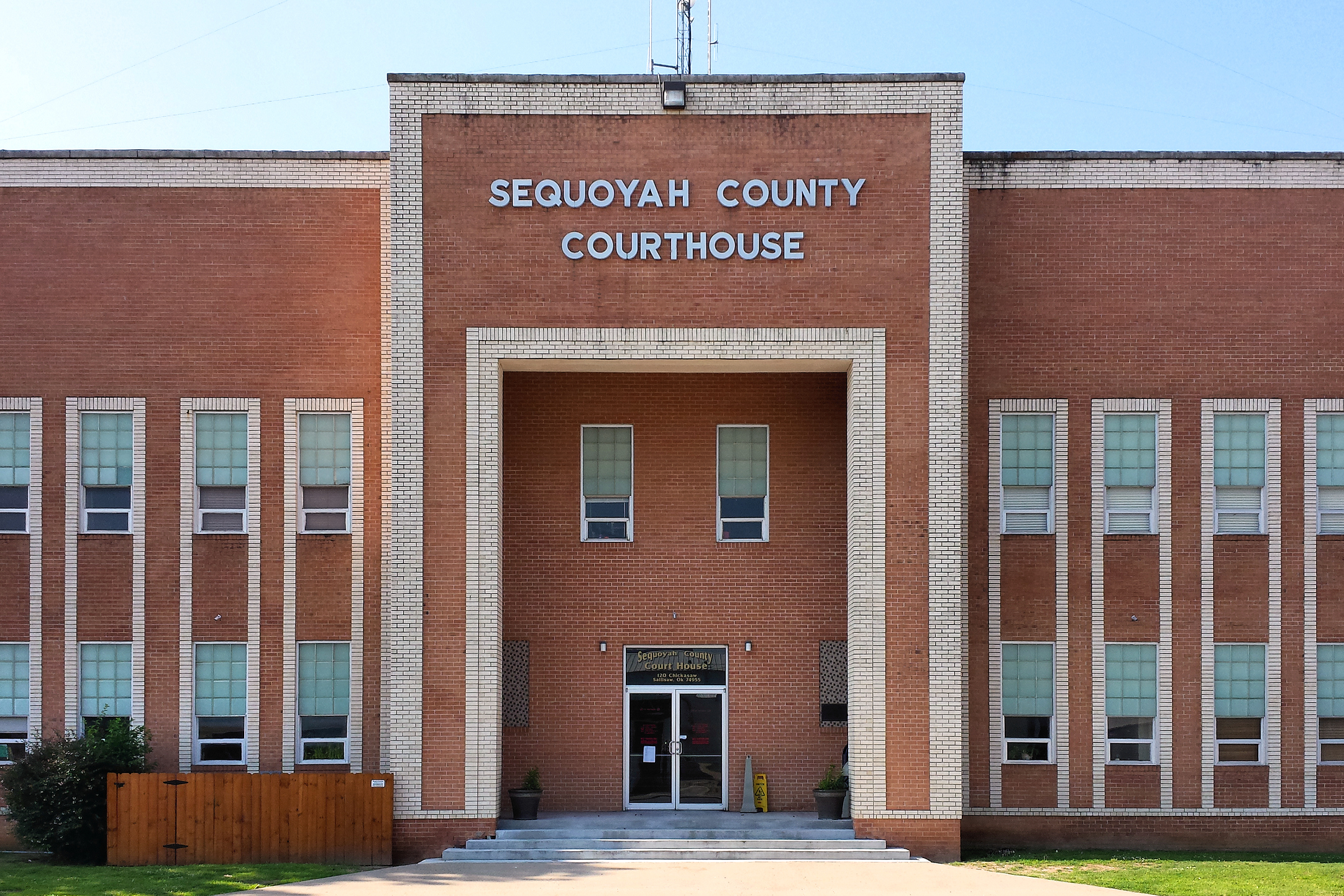
- The Sequoyah County Courthouse in Sallisaw

- Location within the U.S. state of Oklahoma
- Coordinates: 35°30′N 94°45′W
- Country: United States
- State: Oklahoma
- Founded: 1907
- Named for: Sequoyah
- Seat: Sallisaw
- Largest city: Sallisaw

Area
  - Total: 714 sq mi (1,850 km^{2})
  - Land: 673 sq mi (1,740 km^{2})
  - Water: 41 sq mi (110 km^{2}) 5.7%

Population (2020)
  - Total: 39,281
  - Estimate (2025): 40,842 ▲
  - Density: 58/sq mi (22/km^{2})
- Congressional district: 2nd
- Website: sequoyah.okcounties.org

Sequoyah County is a county located in the U.S. state of Oklahoma. As of the 2020 census, the population was 39,281. The county seat is Sallisaw. Sequoyah County was created in 1907 when Oklahoma became a state. It was named after Sequoyah, who created the Cherokee syllabary and its written language.

Sequoyah County is part of the Fort Smith metropolitan area.

== History ==
Archaeological sites within the borders of the present county date to the Archaic Period (6000 BC to 1 AD). A slightly smaller number of sites date to the Plains Village period (1000 to 1500 AD).

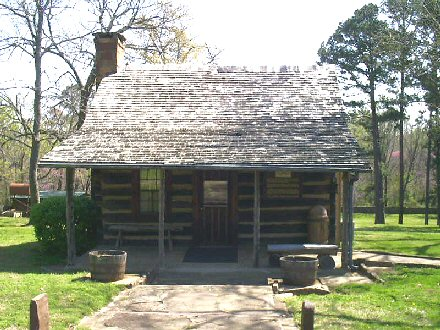
Sequoyah's Cabin in 2004

French traders came to this area in the 1700s, as they had posts in neighboring present-day Arkansas, part of their La Louisiane colony. Spain claimed the area until 1800, when France under Napoleon re-asserted control. He was making a last effort for French colonization in North America. But he ceded control by selling the Louisiana in 1803, when the United States purchased all French territory west of the Mississippi River.

Until 1816 the powerful Osage Nation dominated this and a much larger territory, reaching to the Mississippi River. With Lovely's Purchase, the US bought some of their land. Under pressure in the Southeast, some Cherokee migrated to the west early, and settled here on land granted by the US. The area was then known as Lovely County, Arkansas Territory.

The US forced removal of the Western Cherokee from Arkansas in 1829, resettling them in Indian Territory: present-day Sequoyah County, Oklahoma. Sequoyah was among the Cherokee who moved into this area, where he built a cabin that still stands. The Dwight Mission was moved to a site on Sallisaw Creek, and it still stands.

In the late 1830s, the US forced Indian Removal of most of the Cherokee in the Southeast from the remainder of their lands. They had to trek under Army escort to Indian Territory, a passage they called the Trail of Tears for its high fatalities and sorrows of leaving their homelands.

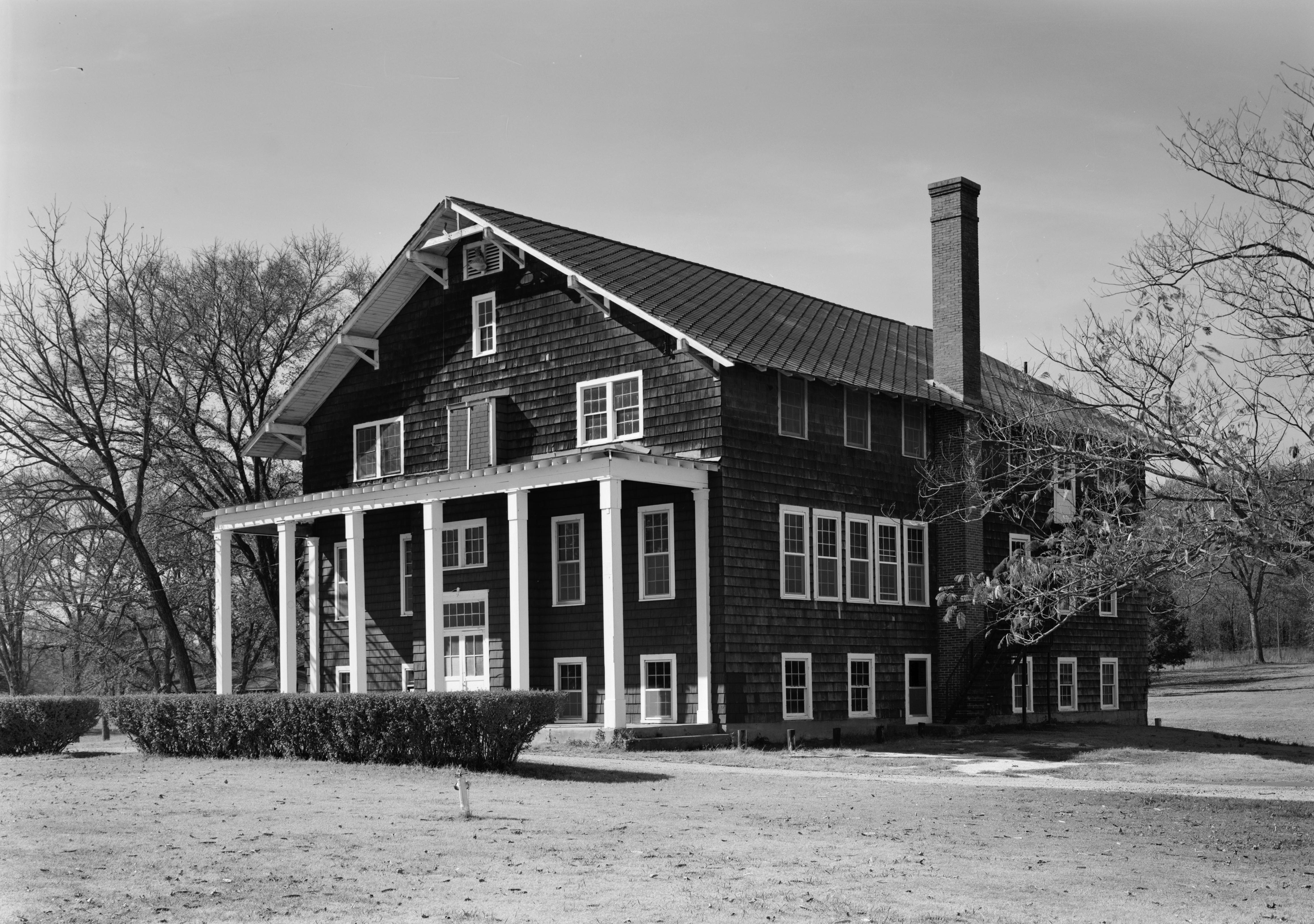
Dwight Mission in October 1969

The Cherokee Nation established its first capital at a place called Tahlonteskee (Tahlontuskey), near the present town of Gore, Oklahoma. Tahlonteskee remained the capital until 1839, when it was superseded by Tahlequah. It continued as a meeting place for the "Old Settlers," as the Western Cherokee were known.

This area, then known as the Sequoyah District, was dominated by Cherokee who were Confederate sympathizers during the Civil War, as were the majority of the nation. Many of the Cherokee were slaveholders; they also had been told that the Confederates would provide them with a Native American state if victorious in the war. The only combat was on June 15, 1864, when Colonel Stand Watie and his Confederate troops conducted the ambush of the Union steamboat J. R. Williams on the Arkansas River.

== Geography ==
According to the U.S. Census Bureau, the county has a total area of 714 square miles (1,850 km^{2}), of which 673 square miles (1,740 km^{2}) is land and 41 square miles (110 km^{2}) (5.7%) is water.

The county is divided between the Ozark Plateau in the north and the Ouachita Mountains in the south. The Cookson Hills are in the northwest part of the county. The Arkansas River forms the southern border. Other major waterways are the Illinois River and Robert S. Kerr Reservoir.

=== Major highways ===
- I-40
- US 59
- US 64
- SH-10
  - SH-10A
- SH-64B
- SH-64D
- SH-82
- SH-100
- SH-101
- SH-141

=== Adjacent counties ===
- Cherokee County & Adair County (north)
- Crawford County, Arkansas (east)
- Sebastian County, Arkansas (southeast)
- Le Flore County (south)
- Haskell County (southwest)
- Muskogee County (west)

=== National protected areas ===
- Fort Smith National Historic Site (part)
- Sequoyah National Wildlife Refuge (part)

=== State protected areas ===
- Tenkiller State Park

== Demographics ==
Historical population
Census	Pop.	Note	%±
1910	25,005		—
1920	26,786		7.1%
1930	19,505		−27.2%
1940	23,138		18.6%
1950	19,773		−14.5%
1960	18,001		−9.0%
1970	23,370		29.8%
1980	30,749		31.6%
1990	33,828		10.0%
2000	38,972		15.2%
2010	42,391		8.8%
2020	39,281		−7.3%
2025 (est.)	40,842	▲	4.0%
U.S. Decennial Census; 1790-1960 1900-1990; 1990-2000 2010-2019

=== 2020 census ===
As of the 2020 census, the county had a population of 39,281, a decline from the 42,391 counted in 2010. Of the residents, 23.7% were under the age of 18 and 19.7% were 65 years of age or older; the median age was 41.7 years. For every 100 females there were 97.7 males, and for every 100 females age 18 and over there were 94.5 males.

The racial makeup of the county was 58.4% White, 1.6% Black or African American, 23.4% American Indian and Alaska Native, 0.7% Asian, 1.8% from some other race, and 14.1% from two or more races. Hispanic or Latino residents of any race comprised 4.4% of the population.

There were 15,309 households in the county, of which 31.1% had children under the age of 18 living with them and 26.8% had a female householder with no spouse or partner present. About 26.5% of all households were made up of individuals and 12.8% had someone living alone who was 65 years of age or older.

There were 18,030 housing units, of which 15.1% were vacant. Among occupied housing units, 71.2% were owner-occupied and 28.8% were renter-occupied. The homeowner vacancy rate was 2.4% and the rental vacancy rate was 10.4%.

=== 2000 census ===
As of the 2000 census, there were 38,972 people, 14,761 households, and 10,982 families residing in the county. The population density was 22/km^{2} (57/mi^{2}). There were 16,940 housing units at an average density of 10/km^{2} (26/mi^{2}). The racial makeup of the county was 68.12% White, 1.86% Black or African American, 19.64% Native American, 0.22% Asian, 0.03% Pacific Islander, 0.74% from other races, and 9.39% from two or more races. 2.03% of the population were Hispanic or Latino of any race. 95.8% spoke English, 2.1% Cherokee and 1.7% Spanish as their first language.

In 2000, there were 14,761 households, out of which 34.20% had children under the age of 18 living with them, 58.20% were married couples living together, 11.90% had a female householder with no husband present, and 25.60% were non-families. 22.40% of all households were made up of individuals, and 10.20% had someone living alone who was 65 years of age or older. The average household size was 2.61 and the average family size was 3.05. In the county, the population was spread out, with 27.40% under the age of 18, 8.20% from 18 to 24, 26.90% from 25 to 44, 24.00% from 45 to 64, and 13.50% who were 65 years of age or older. The median age was 36 years. For every 100 females, there were 97.30 males. For every 100 females age 18 and over, there were 92.50 males.

In 2000, the median income for a household in the county was $27,615, and the median income for a family was $32,673. Males had a median income of $26,613 versus $19,751 for females. The per capita income for the county was $13,405. About 16.10% of families and 19.80% of the population were below the poverty line, including 24.80% of those under age 18 and 18.10% of those age 65 or over.

== Government ==
Sequoyah County Sheriff's Office

Jurisdictional structure
- Operations jurisdiction: Sequoyah, Oklahoma, United States
- Legal jurisdiction: As per operations jurisdiction
- General nature: Local civilian police

Operational structure
- Agency executives: Larry Lane, Sheriff; Charles House, Undersheriff

Facilities
- Stations: 1
- Jails: 1
- Boats: 1

The county law enforcement is the Sequoyah County Sheriff's Office. The department patrols all of the county's rural areas and provides at least three investigators in the department. The current sheriff is Larry Lane.

== Politics ==
Voter Registration and Party Enrollment as of June 30, 2023
Party	Number of Voters	Percentage
Democratic	7,320	31.53%
Republican	12,292	52.94%
Others	3,607	15.53%
Total	23,219	100%

United States presidential election results for Sequoyah County, Oklahoma
Year	Republican		Democratic		Third party(ies)	
Year	No.	%	No.	%	No.	%
1908	2,037	53.38%	1,648	43.19%	131	3.43%
1912	1,115	40.75%	1,416	51.75%	205	7.49%
1916	1,179	35.32%	1,632	48.89%	527	15.79%
1920	3,195	54.96%	2,505	43.09%	113	1.94%
1924	2,875	45.11%	3,429	53.80%	70	1.10%
1928	3,296	55.04%	2,692	44.96%	0	0.00%
1932	1,833	28.04%	4,704	71.96%	0	0.00%
1936	2,609	37.87%	4,281	62.13%	0	0.00%
1940	3,803	45.92%	4,469	53.97%	9	0.11%
1944	2,893	44.70%	3,571	55.18%	8	0.12%
1948	2,077	31.83%	4,449	68.17%	0	0.00%
1952	3,288	44.67%	4,072	55.33%	0	0.00%
1956	3,330	48.33%	3,560	51.67%	0	0.00%
1960	3,862	56.76%	2,942	43.24%	0	0.00%
1964	2,846	39.80%	4,304	60.20%	0	0.00%
1968	2,797	36.93%	2,618	34.57%	2,158	28.50%
1972	6,842	71.64%	2,519	26.37%	190	1.99%
1976	3,938	39.84%	5,873	59.42%	73	0.74%
1980	5,987	53.24%	4,983	44.31%	276	2.45%
1984	7,042	62.32%	4,202	37.19%	56	0.50%
1988	5,710	53.22%	4,951	46.15%	68	0.63%
1992	4,925	36.33%	6,092	44.94%	2,539	18.73%
1996	4,733	39.04%	5,665	46.73%	1,726	14.24%
2000	6,614	53.97%	5,425	44.27%	215	1.75%
2004	8,865	60.00%	5,910	40.00%	0	0.00%
2008	9,466	68.00%	4,454	32.00%	0	0.00%
2012	9,578	69.55%	4,193	30.45%	0	0.00%
2016	10,888	75.42%	3,061	21.20%	488	3.38%
2020	12,113	78.73%	3,035	19.73%	238	1.55%
2024	12,491	80.16%	2,907	18.65%	185	1.19%

== Communities ==
=== City ===
- Sallisaw (county seat)

=== Towns ===
- Gans
- Gore
- Marble City
- Moffett
- Muldrow
- Paradise Hill
- Roland
- Vian

=== Census-designated places ===
- Akins
- Badger Lee
- Belfonte
- Blackgum
- Box
- Brent
- Brushy
- Carlisle
- Dwight Mission
- Evening Shade
- Flute Springs
- Hanson
- Liberty
- Long
- Marble City Community (former)
- McKey (former)
- Nicut
- Notchietown
- Pinhook Corner
- Redbird Smith
- Remy
- Short
- Stoney Point
- Sycamore (former)

=== Unincorporated communities ===
- Cottonwood
- Foreman
- Redland

== NRHP sites ==
The following sites in Sequoyah County are listed on the National Register of Historic Places:

- Baker "A" Archeological Site (34SQ269), Short
- Citizen's State Bank, Marble City
- Dwight Mission, Marble City
- Ellison No. 2 Site (34SQ85), Short
- Judge Franklin Faulkner House, Sallisaw
- Fears Site (34SQ76), Nicut
- First Presbyterian Church, Sallisaw
- Hines Round Barn, Sallisaw
- Kirby-Steely Archeological Site, Short
- Lee's Creek Ceremonial Center Site, Short
- Sallisaw High School, Sallisaw
- Sequoyah's Cabin, Akins
- Starr Pasture Archeological Site (34SQ224), Short
- Tall Cane Archeological Site (34SQ294), Short

== Education ==
K-12 school districts include:

- Braggs Public Schools
- Central Public Schools
- Gans Public Schools
- Gore Public Schools
- Muldrow Public Schools
- Roland Public Schools
- Sallisaw Public Schools
- Vian Public Schools

Elementary school districts include:

- Belfonte Public School
- Brushy Public School
- Liberty Public School
- Marble City Public School
- Moffett Public School
