= Evening Shade, Scott County, Arkansas =

Unincorporated community in Arkansas, U.S.

Coordinates: 34°56′56″N 94°08′13″W

Evening Shade is an unincorporated community in Scott County, in the U.S. state of Arkansas.

== History ==
According to tradition, the community was named for the fact that nearby Poteau Mountain shaded the townsite in the evening sun.
