= Sycamore, Sequoyah County, Oklahoma =

Sycamore
- CDP
- Location within the state of Oklahoma
- Coordinates: 35°32′14″N 94°56′18″W
- Country: United States
- State: Oklahoma
- County: Sequoyah

Area
  - Total: 7.1 sq mi (18 km^{2})
  - Land: 7.1 sq mi (18 km^{2})
- Elevation: 709 ft (216 m)

Population (2000)
  - Total: 150
  - Density: 21/sq mi (8.2/km^{2})
- Time zone: UTC-6 (Central (CST))
  - Summer (DST): UTC-5 (CST)
- GNIS feature ID: 2410043

Sycamore is a census-designated place (CDP) in Sequoyah County, Oklahoma, United States. It is part of the Fort Smith, Arkansas-Oklahoma Metropolitan Statistical Area. The population was 150 at the 2000 census.

== Geography ==
According to the United States Census Bureau, the CDP has a total area of 7.1 square miles (18 km^{2}), all land.

== Demographics ==
As of the census of 2000, there were 150 people, 61 households, and 43 families residing in the CDP. The population density was 21.3 inhabitants per square mile (8.2/km^{2}). There were 79 housing units at an average density of 11.2 per square mile (4.3/km^{2}). The racial makeup of the CDP was 68.67% White, 22.67% Native American, and 8.67% from two or more races.

There were 61 households, out of which 23.0% had children under the age of 18 living with them, 60.7% were married couples living together, 8.2% had a female householder with no husband present, and 29.5% were non-families. 27.9% of all households were made up of individuals, and 13.1% had someone living alone who was 65 years of age or older. The average household size was 2.46 and the average family size was 3.05.

In the CDP, the population was spread out, with 25.3% under the age of 18, 10.0% from 18 to 24, 18.7% from 25 to 44, 29.3% from 45 to 64, and 16.7% who were 65 years of age or older. The median age was 41 years. For every 100 females, there were 94.8 males. For every 100 females age 18 and over, there were 96.5 males.

The median income for a household in the CDP was $35,250, and the median income for a family was $35,417. Males had a median income of $53,750 versus $20,500 for females. The per capita income for the CDP was $10,399. There were 7.9% of families and 16.3% of the population living below the poverty line, including 26.5% of under eighteens and none of those over 64.
