= Marble City Community, Oklahoma =

Marble City Community
- CDP
- Location within the state of Oklahoma
- Coordinates: 35°32′31″N 94°49′18″W
- Country: United States
- State: Oklahoma
- County: Sequoyah

Area
  - Total: 11.2 sq mi (29 km^{2})
  - Land: 10.8 sq mi (28 km^{2})
  - Water: 0.3 sq mi (0.78 km^{2})
- Elevation: 623 ft (190 m)

Population (2000)
  - Total: 420
  - Density: 39/sq mi (15/km^{2})
- Time zone: UTC-6 (Central (CST))
  - Summer (DST): UTC-5 (CST)
- GNIS feature ID: 2408174

Marble City Community is a census-designated place (CDP) in Sequoyah County, Oklahoma, United States. It is part of the Fort Smith, Arkansas-Oklahoma Metropolitan Statistical Area. The population was 420 at the 2000 census.

== Geography ==
According to the United States Census Bureau, the CDP has a total area of 11.2 square miles (28.9 km^{2}), of which 10.8 square miles (28.0 km^{2}) is land and 0.3 square mile (0.9 km^{2}) (3.13%) is water.

== Demographics ==
As of the census of 2000, there were 420 people, 146 households, and 111 families residing in the CDP. The population density was 38.8 inhabitants per square mile (15.0/km^{2}). There were 157 housing units at an average density of 14.5 per square mile (5.6/km^{2}). The racial makeup of the CDP was 49.76% White, 37.14% Native American, 0.24% from other races, and 12.86% from two or more races. Hispanic or Latino of any race were 0.48% of the population.

There were 146 households, out of which 44.5% had children under the age of 18 living with them, 63.7% were married couples living together, 8.2% had a female householder with no husband present, and 23.3% were non-families. 19.2% of all households were made up of individuals, and 8.2% had someone living alone who was 65 years of age or older. The average household size was 2.88 and the average family size was 3.28.

In the CDP, the population was spread out, with 31.4% under the age of 18, 7.4% from 18 to 24, 30.2% from 25 to 44, 25.2% from 45 to 64, and 5.7% who were 65 years of age or older. The median age was 34 years. For every 100 females, there were 103.9 males. For every 100 females age 18 and over, there were 102.8 males.

The median income for a household in the CDP was $26,071, and the median income for a family was $31,667. Males had a median income of $26,250 versus $22,083 for females. The per capita income for the CDP was $10,936. About 19.4% of families and 23.9% of the population were below the poverty line, including 30.4% of those under age 18 and 17.4% of those age 65 or over.
