= Sallisaw, Oklahoma =

Sallisaw
- City
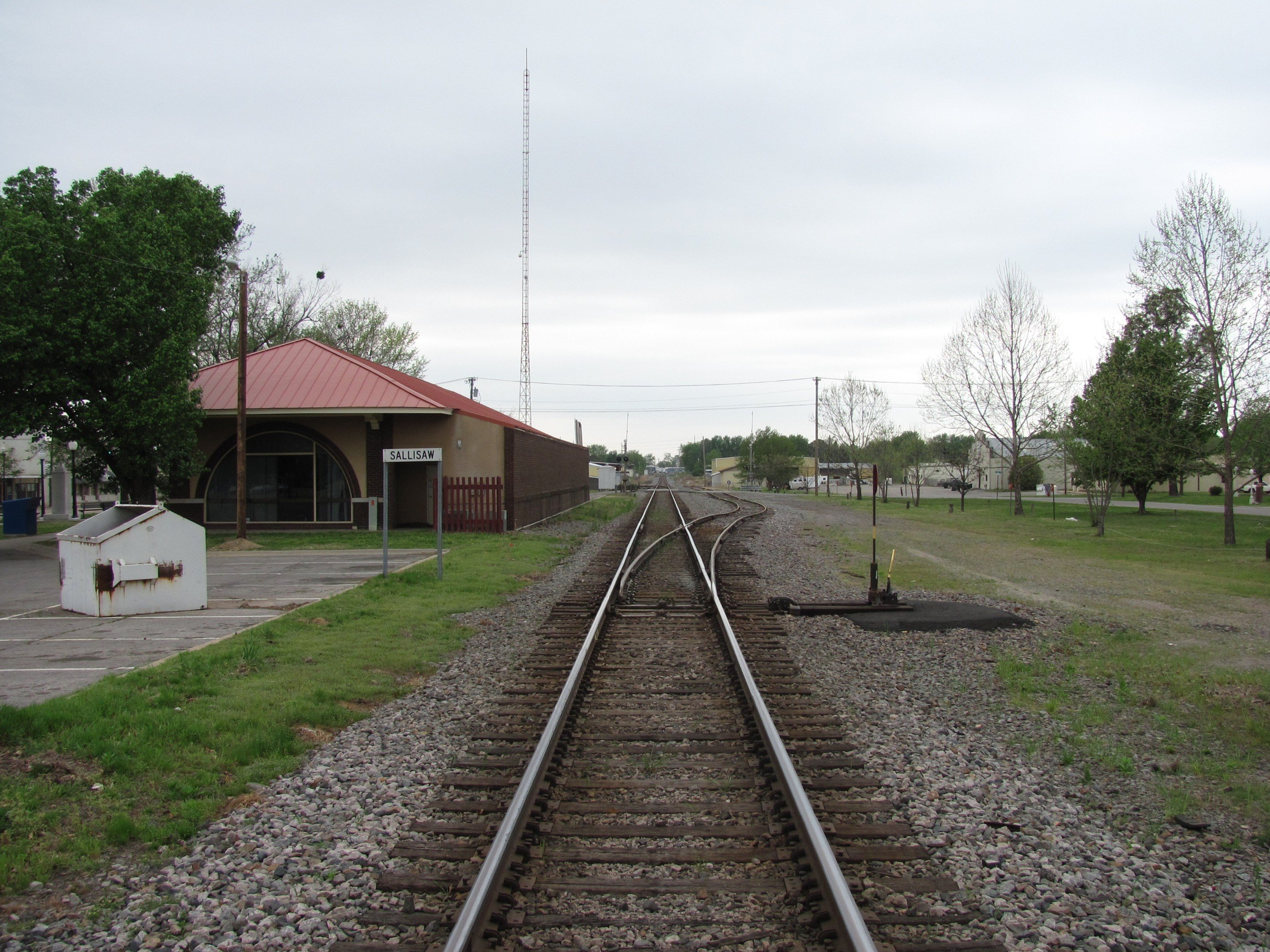
- Stanley Tubbs Memorial Library (Former Missouri Pacific Railroad Depot)
- Motto: "Built on Pride, Dedicated to Excellence"
- Location within the state of Oklahoma
- Coordinates: 35°27′38″N 94°48′26″W
- Country: United States
- State: Oklahoma
- County: Sequoyah

Area
  - Total: 14.00 sq mi (36.26 km^{2})
  - Land: 13.84 sq mi (35.85 km^{2})
  - Water: 0.16 sq mi (0.41 km^{2})
- Elevation: 522 ft (159 m)

Population (2020)
  - Total: 8,510
  - Density: 614.8/sq mi (237.37/km^{2})
- Time zone: UTC-6 (Central (CST))
  - Summer (DST): UTC-5 (CST)
- ZIP Code: 74955
- Area codes: 539/918
- FIPS code: 40-65000
- GNIS feature ID: 2411769
- Website: sallisawok.org

Sallisaw is the largest city in and the county seat of Sequoyah County, Oklahoma, United States. As of the 2020 Census, it had a population of 8,510, a 4.2 percent decrease over the figure of 8,880 recorded in 2010. Sallisaw is part of the Fort Smith metropolitan area.

== History ==
French explorers and traders named this part of North America in the seventeenth century.

In the 1840s and 1850s, Sallisaw was the name of one of the 22 Arkansas River steamboat landings between Fort Smith and Fort Gibson. Modern Sallisaw's beginning as a permanent community began in 1887–1888, when Argyle Quesenbury, a white man, and Will Watie Wheeler, a collateral relative of noted Cherokee leader Stand Watie, laid out lots for a town. Several post offices had existed in the area nearby, even before there was a named community. The site of present-day Sallisaw fell within the boundaries of the Cherokee Nation after the tribe was forced to emigrate from its former home in the Southeastern U.S. It had a post office called Childer's Station from 1873 to 1888, when the name was changed to Sallisaw. Another community fifteen miles north bore the name Sallisaw for a period until 1888, when the name of the post office there was changed to Mays, but it closed in 1896.

Will Watie Wheeler established several businesses in the town during the 1880s and 1890s. These included a cotton gin, saw mill, grist mill and lumberyard. In 1896, he opened the Coffin Shop, which later became the Wheeler Funeral Home. The latter was still doing business in Sallisaw in the twenty-first century.

The Kansas & Arkansas Valley Railway (later the Missouri Pacific Railroad) built an east–west line from Van Buren, Arkansas to Sallisaw in 1888–1890. The Kansas City, Pittsburgh & Gulf Railroad (later named the Kansas City Southern Railroad) built a north–south line through Sallisaw in 1895–96, where the two intersected.

Other early businesses included the Economy Store and McDonald Mercantile Company, operated by William Henry McDonald, who also owned a bank; Matthews Brothers, a grocery, was opened in 1898 by Henry and Arch Matthews; W. D. Mayo and E. M. Pointer founded Mayo and Company, a mercantile and farm implement business. Mr. and Mrs. C. F. Ivey established a long-standing drug store (she also owned hotels). By 1900, Sallisaw recorded a population of 965, which increased to 2,255 in 1920. During this time, the community's economy rose and fell with the price of cotton.

After 1920, lumber and its byproducts began playing a major role in the town's economy, along with coal and petroleum products (including natural gas). The local newspaper, Sequoyah County Times, began publication in 1932. It was founded by Wheeler and Florence Mayo. Wheeler was the son of an earlier Sallisaw businessman. As of 2019, the paper was still owned by the Mayo family.

== Etymology ==
The name Sallisaw was taken from the French word salaison, meaning "salt provisions" in English. The French, who hunted in the area long before the town was founded, called Sallisaw Creek Salaiseau because hunters salted bison meat there. English naturalist Thomas Nuttall recorded the name as Salaiseau, in his journal during his exploration of the area in 1819.

== Geography ==
According to the United States Census Bureau, the city has a total area of 12.9 square miles (33 km^{2}), of which 12.7 square miles (33 km^{2}) is land and 0.2 square miles (0.52 km^{2}) (1.40%) is water.

The city lies within the Green Country region of eastern Oklahoma, known for its rolling green hills. It has three highways running through it: U.S. 59, or Kerr Boulevard, U.S. 64, or Cherokee Avenue, which is the city's main street, and I-40. Sallisaw is located in the central area of the county, 14 miles (23 km) from Muldrow, 11 miles (18 km) from Vian, 19 miles (31 km) from Roland and 22 miles (35 km) from Fort Smith, Arkansas.

According to the Encyclopedia of Oklahoma History and Culture, nearby geographic features include Wildhorse Mountain to the south, Badger Mountain to the northwest, and Lone Pine Mountain to the northeast.

== Demographics ==
Historical population
Census	Pop.	Note	%±
1900	965		—
1910	2,479		156.9%
1920	2,225		−10.2%
1930	1,785		−19.8%
1940	2,140		19.9%
1950	2,885		34.8%
1960	3,351		16.2%
1970	4,888		45.9%
1980	6,403		31.0%
1990	7,122		11.2%
2000	7,989		12.2%
2010	8,880		11.2%
2020	8,510		−4.2%
U.S. Decennial Census

=== 2020 census ===
As of the 2020 census, Sallisaw had a population of 8,510. The median age was 38.1 years. 24.9% of residents were under the age of 18 and 18.8% of residents were 65 years of age or older. For every 100 females there were 92.8 males, and for every 100 females age 18 and over there were 87.5 males age 18 and over.

87.5% of residents lived in urban areas, while 12.5% lived in rural areas.

There were 3,355 households in Sallisaw, of which 32.0% had children under the age of 18 living in them. Of all households, 40.9% were married-couple households, 17.9% were households with a male householder and no spouse or partner present, and 33.7% were households with a female householder and no spouse or partner present. About 30.7% of all households were made up of individuals and 14.4% had someone living alone who was 65 years of age or older.

There were 3,850 housing units, of which 12.9% were vacant. Among occupied housing units, 53.8% were owner-occupied and 46.2% were renter-occupied. The homeowner vacancy rate was 3.6% and the rental vacancy rate was 13.8%.

Racial composition as of the 2020 census
Race	Percent
White	55.6%
Black or African American	1.5%
American Indian and Alaska Native	24.4%
Asian	0.8%
Native Hawaiian and Other Pacific Islander	<0.1%
Some other race	2.9%
Two or more races	14.7%
Hispanic or Latino (of any race)	6.7%

=== 2000 census ===
As of the 2000 census, there were 7,989 people, 3,206 households, and 2,151 families residing in the city. The population density was 629.0 inhabitants per square mile (242.9/km^{2}). There were 3,556 housing units at an average density of 280.0 per square mile (108.1/km^{2}). The racial makeup of the city was 68.29% White, 1.35% African American, 20.30% Native American, 0.29% Asian, 0.03% Pacific Islander, 1.11% from other races, and 8.62% from two or more races. Hispanic or Latino of any race were 2.25% of the population.

There were 3,206 households, out of which 31.9% had children under the age of 18 living with them, 47.1% were married couples living together, 15.3% had a female householder with no husband present, and 32.9% were non-families. 29.6% of all households were made up of individuals, and 13.9% had someone living alone who was 65 years of age or older. The average household size was 2.42 and the average family size was 2.99.

In the city, the population was spread out, with 26.6% under the age of 18, 9.9% from 18 to 24, 25.0% from 25 to 44, 21.8% from 45 to 64, and 16.7% who were 65 years of age or older. The median age was 36 years. For every 100 females, there were 89.9 males. For every 100 females age 18 and over, there were 82.9 males.

The median income for a household in the city was $24,821, and the median income for a family was $31,572. Males had a median income of $26,793 versus $19,775 for females. The per capita income for the city was $13,231. About 18.5% of families and 23.3% of the population were below the poverty line, including 30.6% of those under age 18 and 15.9% of those age 65 or over.

== Economy ==
The local economy was based on cotton farming during the town's early years. During the 1920s, the focus of the economy shifted to the production of lumber, oil and natural gas. A prison camp was established here during World War II. After the war, a variety of industrial and retail businesses were established.

The Sequoyah County Times, founded by Wheeler Mayo in 1932, is called "the largest-circulation, non-metro, non-daily newspaper in Oklahoma." It was still owned by the Mayo family as of 2019.

East Cherokee Avenue is a business loop, with Sallisaw's only mall, the Eastgate Shopping Center, originally a Walmart store, which was moved to 1101 W. Ruth Avenue in 2001. The Sallisaw Municipal Airport is located a half mile south of the intersection of I-40 and U.S. 59.

Blue Ribbon Downs (BRD), a horse racing venue, was established in Sallisaw during the 1960s by Bill Hedge. He sold the track to an investment group in 1973. Legalization of gambling on horse racing did not occur until 1982, so the first pari-mutuel race occurred August 30, 1984. This caused a short-term boom in track-related businesses. However, the popularity waned and the track struggled financially. The Choctaw Nation bought the facility in 2003 for $4.25 million, put in more capital and converted it to a "racino" that combined the race track with a casino. Despite the improvements, BRD was not a financial success and closed permanently in 2010. the Choctaw Nation tried to sell the operation on two occasions, but the deals fell through. Then, just one day before the track was to be sold at a sheriff's auction in November 2003, the Cherokee Nation purchased the property for $2.5 million. The Cherokee chief, Chad Smith, said that his nation did not plan to resume horse racing at the site, but is considering other options for using the land. He admitted that using the track as a training facility would also be considered.

The only commercial manufacturing reported in Sallisaw has been the BorgWarner Morse Tech, a maker of auto parts and plastic foam packing materials.

== Government ==
The post office is located at 111 McGee Drive, on the east side of town.

== Education ==
Its main public schools are Liberty Elementary, Eastside Elementary, Sallisaw Middle School, and Sallisaw High School which is located on West Ruth Avenue.

In higher education, it features a branch of Carl Albert State College, based in Poteau. A campus of Indian Capital Technology Center is also located in Sallisaw.

The Stanley Tubbs Memorial Library is a branch of the Eastern Oklahoma District Library System (EODLS). The Sallisaw Branch is located in a historic building that once was the Sallisaw railroad station.

== Infrastructure ==
The hospital is Northeastern Health Systems Sequoyah (formerly Sequoyah Memorial Hospital), at 213 Redwood Avenue. Redbird Smith Health Clinic also provides health-related services.

== Transportation ==
The city is served by Sallisaw Municipal Airport (sign KJSV). The main runway, designated 17/35, is 4,006 feet (1,221 m) long by 75 feet (23 m) wide. The facility is attended 7 days per week (0800–1700), except for Federal holidays. It has a lighted wind indicator, but no control tower.

Commercial air transportation is available out of Fort Smith Regional Airport, about 28 miles to the east-southeast.

Rail freight service is provided by both the Union Pacific and the Kansas City Southern Railway.

== Cultural references ==
- The Joad family from the Pulitzer Prize–winning novel The Grapes of Wrath by John Steinbeck were sharecroppers from Sallisaw. However, the fictional place described in the novel differs from the actual town in many important respects.

== Notable people ==
- John R. Bennett, state representative
- Charles Arthur Floyd aka "Pretty Boy Floyd" grew up near Sallisaw.
- Janelle Fullbright (1945–2016), Cherokee Nation Tribal Councilor (2007–2015), Deputy Speaker (2013–2015)
- Jack C. Montgomery (1917–2002) was a United States Army officer who was awarded the Medal of Honor for actions during World War II.
- Robert Reed of Brady Bunch fame lived for a time on Highway 64 east of Sallisaw near the Gans exit.
- Matt Wells American football coach, former head coach at Texas Tech University
