= Muldrow, Oklahoma =

Town in Oklahoma, United States

- Town
- Town of Muldrow
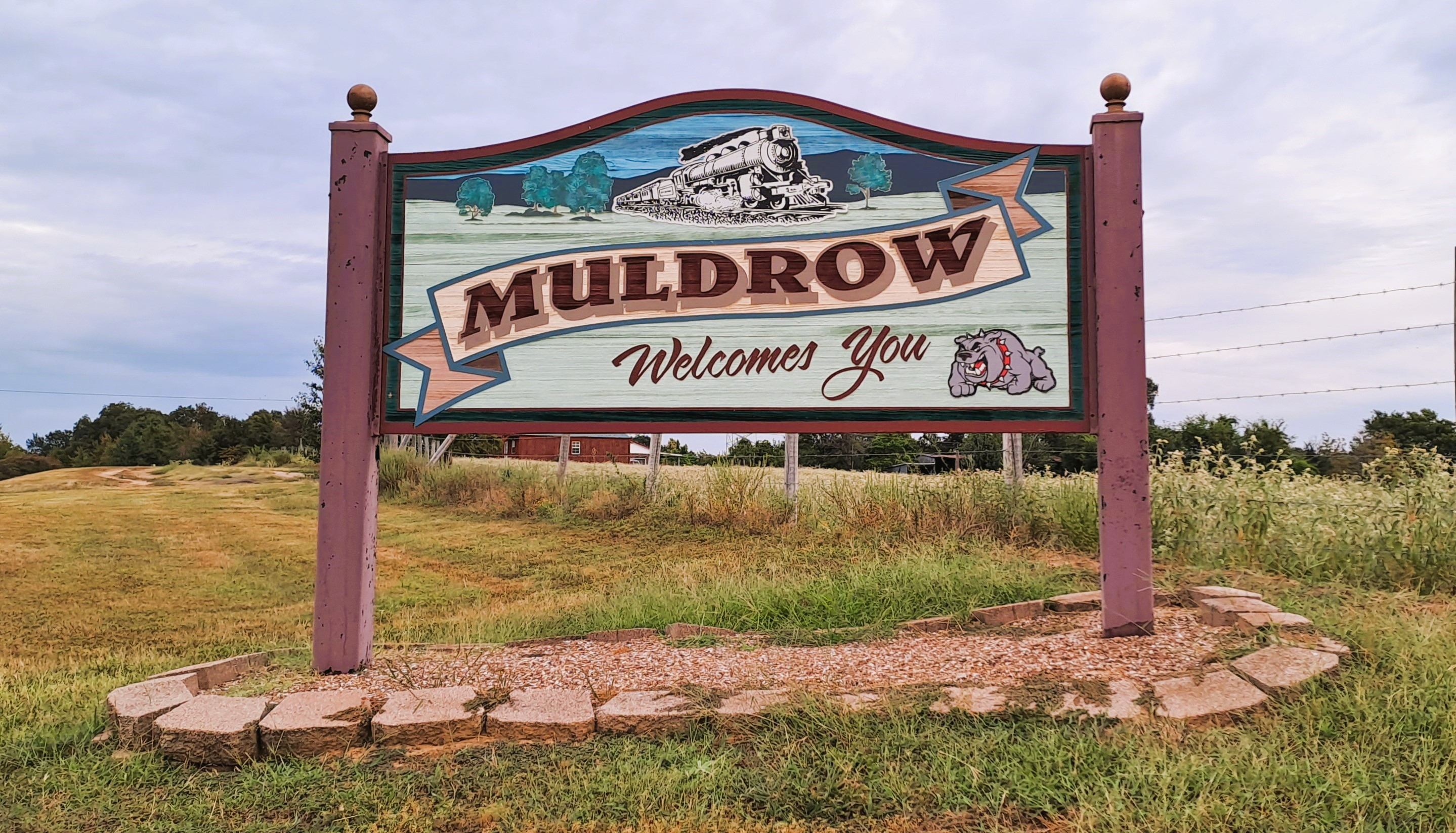
- Welcome sign on State Highway 64B

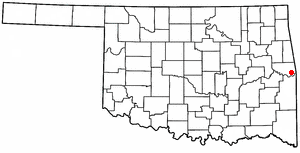
- Location in the state of Oklahoma

- Location in the United States
- Coordinates: 35°24′22.3″N 94°35′55.8″W
- Country: United States
- State: Oklahoma
- County: Sequoyah
- Founded: November 19, 1887
- Named after: Henry L. Muldrow

Government
  - Type: Mayor–Council

Area
  - Total: 4.29 sq mi (11.11 km^{2})
  - Land: 4.24 sq mi (10.98 km^{2})
  - Water: 0.050 sq mi (0.13 km^{2})
- Elevation: 505 ft (154 m)

Population (2020)
  - Total: 3,272
  - Density: 771.9/sq mi (298.04/km^{2})
- Time zone: UTC-6 (Central (CST))
  - Summer (DST): UTC-5 (CDT)
- ZIP code(s): 74948
- Area codes: 539, 918
- FIPS code: 40-49850
- GNIS feature ID: 2413026
- Major airport: FSM

Muldrow, officially the Town of Muldrow, is a town in Sequoyah County, Oklahoma, United States. It is part of the Fort Smith, Arkansas–Oklahoma Metropolitan Statistical Area. As of the 2020 census, Muldrow had a population of 3,272.

== Etymology ==
In 1887, Muldrow was named in honor of Henry L. Muldrow, first assistant U.S. secretary of the interior.

== Geography ==
According to the United States Census Bureau, the town has a total area of 3.9 square miles (10 km^{2}), of which 3.8 square miles (9.8 km^{2}) is land and 0.04 square miles (0.10 km^{2}) (0.52%) is water.

== Demographics ==
Historical population
Census	Pop.	Note	%±
1900	465		—
1910	671		44.3%
1920	693		3.3%
1930	557		−19.6%
1940	638		14.5%
1950	828		29.8%
1960	1,137		37.3%
1970	1,680		47.8%
1980	2,538		51.1%
1990	2,889		13.8%
2000	3,104		7.4%
2010	3,466		11.7%
2020	3,272		−5.6%
U.S. Decennial Census

=== 2020 census ===
As of the 2020 census, Muldrow had a population of 3,272. The median age was 36.5 years. 26.3% of residents were under the age of 18 and 16.6% of residents were 65 years of age or older. For every 100 females there were 94.3 males, and for every 100 females age 18 and over there were 88.3 males age 18 and over.

0.0% of residents lived in urban areas, while 100.0% lived in rural areas.

There were 1,256 households in Muldrow, of which 36.1% had children under the age of 18 living in them. Of all households, 40.5% were married-couple households, 20.6% were households with a male householder and no spouse or partner present, and 32.2% were households with a female householder and no spouse or partner present. About 26.8% of all households were made up of individuals and 11.9% had someone living alone who was 65 years of age or older.

There were 1,438 housing units, of which 12.7% were vacant. The homeowner vacancy rate was 3.3% and the rental vacancy rate was 11.9%.

Racial composition as of the 2020 census
Race	Number	Percent
White	1,969	60.2%
Black or African American	41	1.3%
American Indian and Alaska Native	684	20.9%
Asian	21	0.6%
Native Hawaiian and Other Pacific Islander	1	0.0%
Some other race	62	1.9%
Two or more races	494	15.1%
Hispanic or Latino (of any race)	166	5.1%

=== 2000 census ===
As of the census of 2000, there were 3,104 people, 1,204 households, and 846 families residing in the town. The population density was 805.8 inhabitants per square mile (311.1/km^{2}). There were 1,313 housing units at an average density of 340.8 per square mile (131.6/km^{2}). The racial makeup of the town was 69.59% White, 1.80% African American, 16.43% Native American, 0.29% Asian, 0.06% Pacific Islander, 1.32% from other races, and 10.50% from two or more races. Hispanic or Latino of any race were 3.70% of the population.

There were 1,204 households, out of which 32.9% had children under the age of 18 living with them, 51.2% were married couples living together, 15.4% had a female householder with no husband present, and 29.7% were non-families. 26.2% of all households were made up of individuals, and 11.7% had someone living alone who was 65 years of age or older. The average household size was 2.54 and the average family size was 3.08.

In the town, the population was spread out, with 28.1% under the age of 18, 9.1% from 18 to 24, 26.5% from 25 to 44, 22.7% from 45 to 64, and 13.7% who were 65 years of age or older. The median age was 35 years. For every 100 females, there were 91.5 males. For every 100 females age 18 and over, there were 83.3 males.

The median income for a household in the town was $26,216, and the median income for a family was $32,083. Males had a median income of $26,603 versus $18,984 for females. The per capita income for the town was $11,918. About 14.1% of families and 18.2% of the population were below the poverty line, including 20.2% of those under age 18 and 21.7% of those age 65 or over.

== Education ==
Muldrow's public schools are Muldrow Elementary, Muldrow Middle School, and Muldrow High School. The elementary school is located on Main Street, while the high school and middle school are located on Shawntel Smith Boulevard.

== Parks and recreation ==
Muldrow City Park has a playground, a walking/jogging trail, two basketball courts, a volleyball court, a large covered pavilion, a children's splash pad, and a creek. Special events are held there, including Old Settler's Day.

Muldrow Lake is to the northeast of town. In one year’s spring Wildlife Department catch-and-release survey of lakes smaller than 1000 acres, Muldrow City Lake produced the most bass per hour, at 195.

Robert S. Kerr Reservoir, located in the picturesque Cookson Hills country and featuring 250 miles of rugged, irregular shoreline, is to the west-southwest.

Sequoyah’s Cabin Museum is about 12 miles north-northwest of town. It features the actual one-room log cabin built in 1829 by Sequoyah, creator of the Cherokee written language, surrounded by a 10-acre park, and is complete with relics and documents associated with his life. The site is listed on the National Register of Historic Places listings in Sequoyah County, Oklahoma.

== Notable people ==
- Charles Winchester Breedlove, Los Angeles City Council member, 1933–45
- Glen Condren, former NFL defensive lineman for the New York Giants and Atlanta Falcons
- Jim Mundy/James White, a Top 40 Country Singer and award-winning songwriter
- Shawntel Smith, Miss America 1996.
- Joshua L. Wheeler, Army master sergeant killed in Iraq on October 22, 2015.

== See also ==
- List of places in the United States named after people
