= List of United States tornadoes from June to July 2025 =

List of tornadoes in the United States

United States tornadoes from June to July 2025
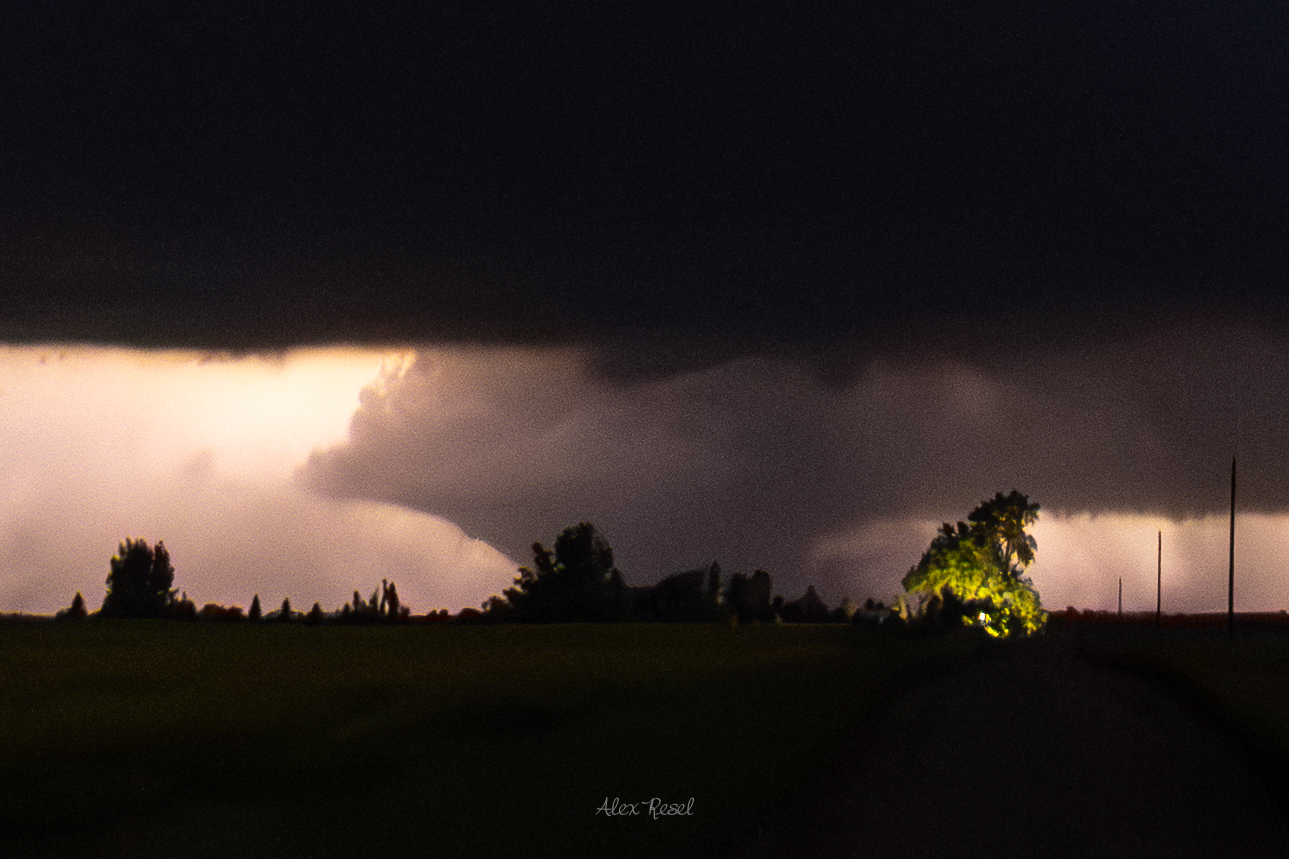
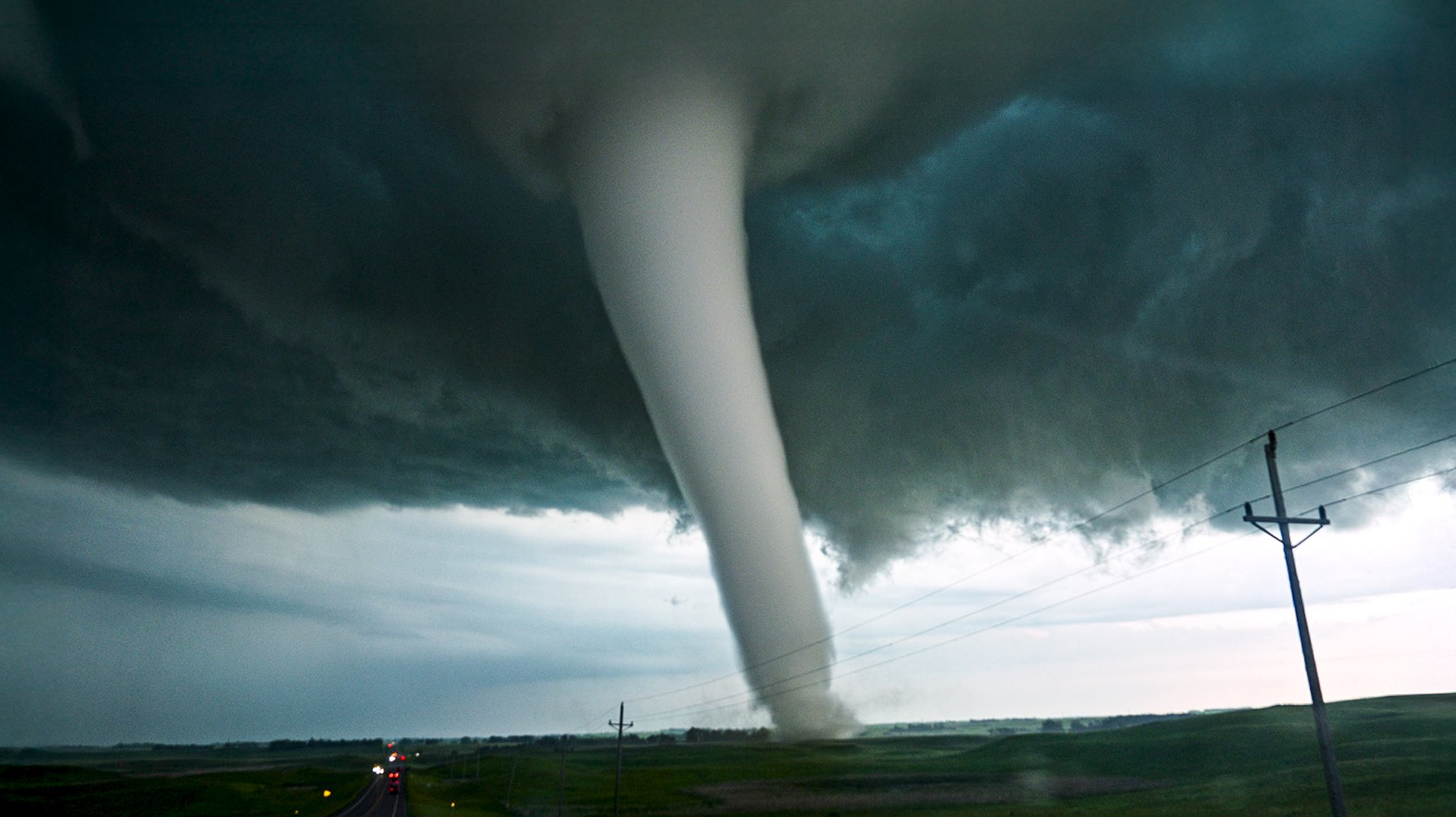
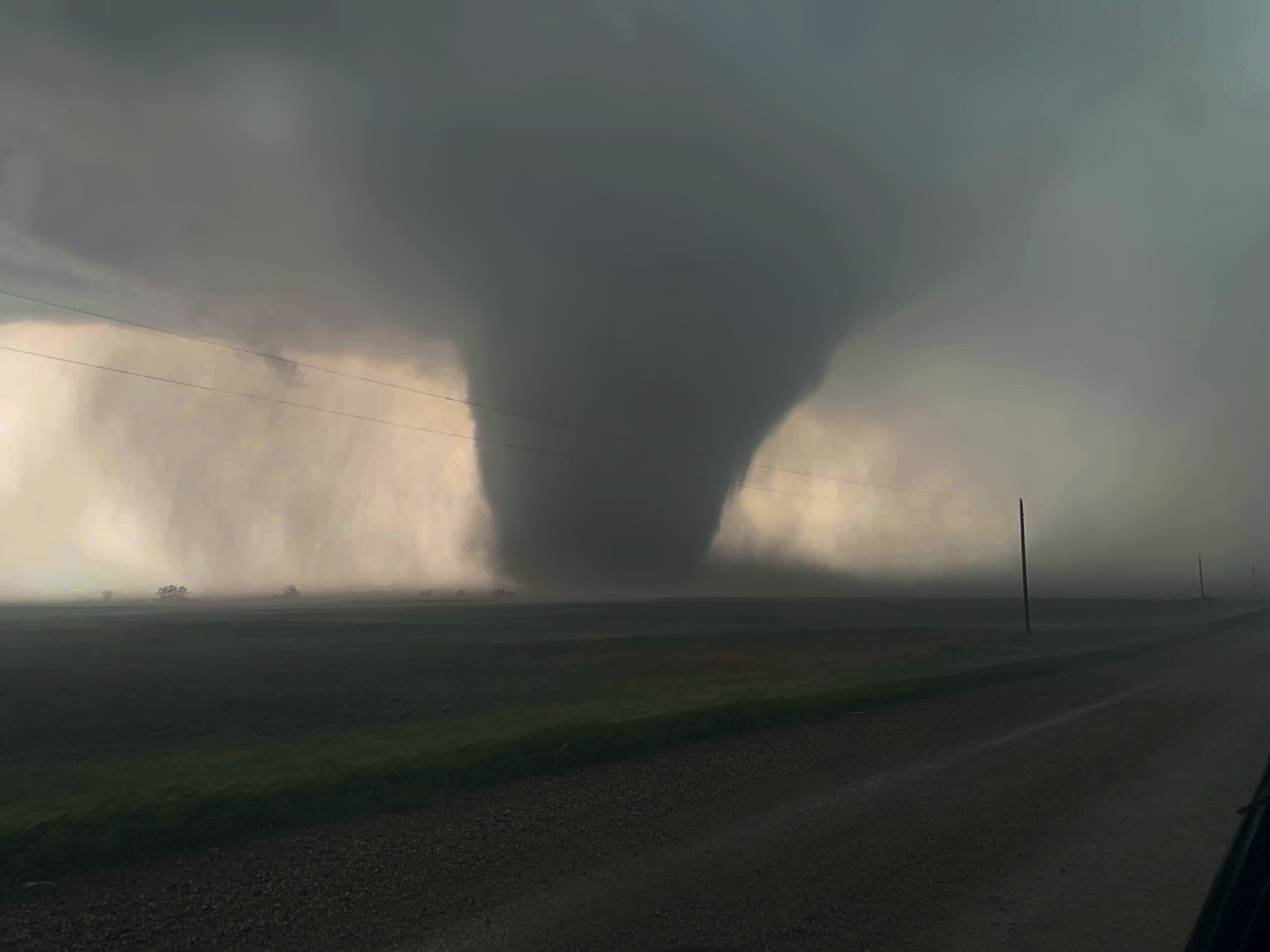
- Clockwise from top: An EF5 tornado near Enderlin, North Dakota on June 20, the first to be rated as such since 2013; An EF3 tornado near Spiritwood, North Dakota on June 20; A high-end EF3 tornado near Gary, South Dakota on June 28
- Timespan: June 2 – July 31
- Maximum rated tornado: EF5 tornado: Enderlin, North Dakota on June 20
- Tornadoes: 343
- Fatalities: 6
- Injuries: 6

This page documents all tornadoes confirmed by various weather forecast offices of the National Weather Service in the United States in June and July 2025. On average, there are 213 confirmed tornadoes in June and 119 confirmed tornadoes in July.

In June, tornadoes are commonly focused across the Midwest and the central and northern Great Plains, and occasionally the Northeast, all due to their proximity to the late spring/early summer jet stream which continues to retreat farther north. Additionally, activity can sometimes increase in the Florida Peninsula as a result of early-season tropical activity. In July, the northern states nearer the Canadian border are most favored for tornadoes, including the Upper Midwest, the Great Lakes and the Northeastern states, due to the positioning of the summertime jet stream. Summer thunderstorms and tropical activity can also result in (mostly weak) tornado activity in the Florida Peninsula.

With relatively high activity across the northern tier of the country, June finished with an above average total of 248 confirmed tornadoes despite no tropical cyclones impacting the United States during the month, and also included the first violent rated U.S. tornado in June since 2014 and the first EF5 rated tornado since 2013 and the first F5/EF5 tornado in the month of June since 1992. July finished below average, with only 94 tornadoes confirmed in the month, as activity dropped considerably in the northern part of the country and only one tropical storm affected the US during the month.

== June ==
Confirmed tornadoes by Enhanced Fujita rating
EFU	EF0	EF1	EF2	EF3	EF4	EF5	Total
68	75	88	15	2	0	1	249

=== June 2 event ===
List of confirmed tornadoes – Monday, June 2, 2025 (Note: All dates are based on the local time zone where the tornado touched down; however, all times are in Coordinated Universal Time for consistency.)
EF#	Location	County / parish	State	Start coord.	Time (UTC)	Path length	Max. width
EFU	N of Kanorado	Sherman	KS	39.4434°N 102.0263°W	23:14–23:16	0.01 mi (0.016 km)	50 yd (46 m)
EFU	A brief landspout was reported.						

=== June 3 event ===
List of confirmed tornadoes – Tuesday, June 3, 2025
EF#	Location	County / parish	State	Start coord.	Time (UTC)	Path length	Max. width
EF0	Eastern Kansas City	Jackson	MO	39.0429°N 94.5001°W	19:24–19:27	0.84 mi (1.35 km)	40 yd (37 m)
EF0	A weak tornado broke several tree branches near and in the Truman Sports Complex.						
EF1	Independence	Jackson	MO	39.0824°N 94.3896°W	19:35–19:44	3.71 mi (5.97 km)	50 yd (46 m)
EF1	Several trees were snapped, a few of which were also uprooted.						
EF0	SSW of Renfrow	Grant	OK	36.884°N 97.681°W	20:45	0.2 mi (0.32 km)	30 yd (27 m)
EF0	Minor tree damage occurred.						
EFU	NNE of Lucien	Noble	OK	36.3201°N 97.4294°W	20:49	0.1 mi (0.16 km)	20 yd (18 m)
EFU	A brief tornado was reported by a storm chaser.						
EF0	Western Mustang	Canadian	OK	35.3949°N 97.7535°W	21:35–21:36	0.62 mi (1.00 km)	20 yd (18 m)
EF0	This tornado damaged trees and fences in a neighborhood within Mustang.						
EF0	ESE of Rader	Wright	MO	37.4525°N 92.6869°W	21:37	0.44 mi (0.71 km)	100 yd (91 m)
EF0	Two barns had their roofs damaged.						
EF1	SSE of Newcastle	McClain	OK	35.208°N 97.585°W	22:00–22:05	2.8 mi (4.5 km)	125 yd (114 m)
EF1	A home had its roof damaged, a barn collapsed, and numerous large trees were uprooted.						
EF1	ESE of Katie	Garvin	OK	34.558°N 97.284°W	22:39–22:44	2.4 mi (3.9 km)	150 yd (140 m)
EF1	This tornado tracked north-northeast, damaging the east-facing garage door of a home and causing significant tree damage near the start of its path.						
EF0	SW of Fort Madison	Lee	IA	40.58°N 91.44°W	22:58–23:00	0.46 mi (0.74 km)	100 yd (91 m)
EF0	This brief tornado derailed a train and damaged an irrigator, a garage, and trees.						
EFU	NW of Archer City	Archer	TX	33.6412°N 98.6915°W	23:10	0.1 mi (0.16 km)	50 yd (46 m)
EFU	Storm chasers observed a brief tornado.						
EF1	New Boston	Mercer	IL	41.17°N 91°W	23:38–23:40	1.57 mi (2.53 km)	175 yd (160 m)
EF1	A roof was blown off a building and numerous trees were snapped in and northeast of New Boston.						
EF1	Joy to Millersburg to SW of Hamlet	Mercer	IL	41.2°N 90.93°W	23:42–23:54	10.84 mi (17.45 km)	250 yd (230 m)
EF1	Several trees and utility poles were significantly damaged. Minor outbuilding damage also occurred.						
EF1	Southeastern Monmouth to E of Gerlaw	Warren	IL	40.89°N 90.64°W	23:46–23:57	7.78 mi (12.52 km)	50 yd (46 m)
EF1	This tornado began in southern Monmouth and tracked across the southeast corner of the city damaging trees, sheds, and a garage. A roof was torn off a mobile home and roof was damaged on a house. It continued northeast where it tore the roof off a shop building before dissipating.						
EF0	S of Edgington	Rock Island	IL	41.35°N 90.77°W	23:57–23:59	1.2 mi (1.9 km)	25 yd (23 m)
EF0	This high-end EF0 tornado snapped a few areas of trees.						
EF1	NE of Marston to Southern Rock Island to Milan	Rock Island	IL	41.33°N 90.78°W	23:57–00:14	14.43 mi (23.22 km)	300 yd (270 m)
EF1	Three large, empty grain bins were heavily damaged and an outbuilding was destroyed. A well-constructed farm outbuilding was completely demolished. Trees throughout Rock Island and Milan were also damaged.						
EF1	E of Hamlet to Reynolds	Mercer, Rock Island	IL	41.31°N 90.7°W	23:59–00:04	3.79 mi (6.10 km)	100 yd (91 m)
EF1	Tree damage was noted throughout Reynolds.						
EF1	SW of Coyne Center to Moline	Rock Island	IL	41.37°N 90.62°W	00:06–00:20	12.44 mi (20.02 km)	300 yd (270 m)
EF1	This tornado tracked from southwest of Coyne Center into southern Moline, producing significant tree damage and striking a mobile home park where several homes were severely damaged or destroyed. It continued past the Quad Cities International Airport, crossed I-280, and caused further tree damage north of the Rock River, including trees falling on garages and sheds. Near SouthPark Mall, it damaged numerous trees, commercial signage, and windows, including windows in multiple vehicles.						
EF0	W of Atoka	Atoka	OK	34.414°N 96.227°W	01:28-01:32	4.5 mi (7.2 km)	100 yd (91 m)
EF0	Damage to tree branches was reported near Lake Atoka Reservoir from a weak tornado.						
EF0	Western Belvidere	Boone	IL	42.2681°N 88.914°W	02:05–02:06	0.31 mi (0.50 km)	75 yd (69 m)
EF0	Multiple trees were uprooted or snapped, and several large tree limbs and branches were downed as well, including some that fell onto powerlines.						

=== June 4 event ===
List of confirmed tornadoes – Wednesday, June 4, 2025
EF#	Location	County / parish	State	Start coord.	Time (UTC)	Path length	Max. width
EFU	NNE of Springerville	Apache	AZ	34.2°N 109.24°W	17:00–17:15	0.53 mi (0.85 km)	50 yd (46 m)
EFU	A landspout occurred over a rural field.						
EF1	Wildwood to Chesterfield	St. Louis	MO	38.6065°N 90.6579°W	19:50–20:00	6.81 mi (10.96 km)	300 yd (270 m)
EF1	This tornado damaged trees and homes.						
EFU	NW of Kim	Las Animas	CO	37.42°N 103.44°W	23:05–23:10	1.16 mi (1.87 km)	20 yd (18 m)
EFU	A tornado was observed. No damage was reported.						
EF0	N of Simms	Deaf Smith	TX	35.1451°N 102.6532°W	02:48–02:49	0.83 mi (1.34 km)	50 yd (46 m)
EF0	A few irrigation pivots were overturned.						

=== June 5 event ===
List of confirmed tornadoes – Thursday, June 5, 2025
EF#	Location	County / parish	State	Start coord.	Time (UTC)	Path length	Max. width
EFU	S of Moab	San Juan	UT	38.4278°N 109.5471°W	17:30–18:00	0.1 mi (0.16 km)	10 yd (9.1 m)
EFU	A landspout occurred over Flat Iron Mesa, remaining over open country.						
EF0	S of Brewster	Stark	OH	40.6828°N 81.5958°W	20:04–20:05	0.15 mi (0.24 km)	25 yd (23 m)
EF0	A brief tornado lifted slate tiles from a barn roof, knocked down two large trees, and broke large tree branches. The tornado was recorded by a door camera.						
EFU	SSE of Johnson City	Stanton	KS	37.47°N 101.7°W	21:22	0.88 mi (1.42 km)	20 yd (18 m)
EFU	A very brief tornado lasted for less than a minute.						
EFU	NW of Rogers	Roosevelt	NM	34.03°N 103.29°W	21:34–21:36	0.28 mi (0.45 km)	50 yd (46 m)
EFU	A former NWS employee reported a tornado.						
EF0	NW of Lingo	Roosevelt	NM	33.81°N 103.17°W	21:37–21:38	0.49 mi (0.79 km)	50 yd (46 m)
EF0	Broadcast media reported a brief tornado.						
EFU	NNW of Rogers	Roosevelt	NM	34.05°N 103.26°W	21:40–21:42	0.36 mi (0.58 km)	50 yd (46 m)
EFU	A tornado was reported by storm chasers and broadcast media.						
EFU	SW of Causey	Roosevelt	NM	33.8391°N 103.1694°W	21:41–21:43	0.55 mi (0.89 km)	50 yd (46 m)
EFU	A tornado downed power lines and trees but was given an EFU rating.						
EFU	ENE of Loving	Eddy	NM	32.35°N 103.83°W	21:45–21:46	0.29 mi (0.47 km)	25 yd (23 m)
EFU	A landspout was reported.						
EFU	NNE of Lingo	Roosevelt	NM	33.8199°N 103.1047°W	21:55–22:00	0.85 mi (1.37 km)	50 yd (46 m)
EFU	This tornado was reported near a cattle plant by broadcast media.						
EFU	NE of Lingo	Roosevelt	NM	33.8198°N 103.0851°W	22:03–22:07	1.1 mi (1.8 km)	50 yd (46 m)
EFU	A tornado was reported.						
EFU	E of Lingo, NM to WSW of Maple	Cochran	TX	33.8048°N 103.0395°W	22:10–22:15	2.53 mi (4.07 km)	50 yd (46 m)
EFU	This tornado was observed by storm spotters. No damage occurred.						
EF2	S of Maple to NE of Morton	Cochran	TX	33.7961°N 102.8805°W	22:30–22:50	9.92 mi (15.96 km)	1,725 yd (1,577 m)
EF2	A very large, strong tornado leaned or snapped several wooden poles and flipped two center pivot irrigation systems.						
EFU	SSW of Pep	Cochran, Hockley	TX	33.7505°N 102.6162°W	22:55–23:07	4.53 mi (7.29 km)	100 yd (91 m)
EFU	A large tornado was reported by a storm chaser and noted on radar. NWS Lubbock and RaXPol radar data suggest this tornado was of at least EF2 strength, but no known damage occurred.						
EFU	SSE of Pep	Hockley	TX	33.72°N 102.5262°W	23:13–23:15	0.89 mi (1.43 km)	500 yd (460 m)
EFU	A brief tornado was observed by broadcast media.						
EF2	S of Whitharral	Hockley	TX	33.7066°N 102.3882°W	23:27–23:54	8.82 mi (14.19 km)	1,936 yd (1,770 m)
EF2	This very large, slow-moving tornado snapped several wooden power poles, rolled a semi-truck traveling on US 385, heavily damaged and/or rolled mobile homes, a small building, and a camper, and damaged trees.						
EF1	NNE of Smyer to NW of Reese Center	Hockley	TX	33.6324°N 102.1472°W	00:12–00:24	3.6 mi (5.8 km)	880 yd (800 m)
EF1	This large, high-end EF1 tornado moved through a community of manufactured homes. Two of the homes were rolled off their foundations and destroyed, injuring two people. It also rolled a small barn into the side of a mobile home, puncturing it, and flipped a stock tank. An RV may have also been flipped.						
EF2	ENE of Smyer to W of Reese Center	Hockley, Lubbock	TX	33.6205°N 102.0994°W	00:19–00:42	3.25 mi (5.23 km)	968 yd (885 m)
EF2	This large, strong tornado rolled and destroyed mobile homes, including one that was rolled into and damaged a barn. It also rolled an RV and tossed its covered metal carport into the back side of a home, puncturing it before damaging a fence when it landed.						
EF1	Reese Center	Lubbock	TX	33.6018°N 102.0568°W	00:43–00:54	2.58 mi (4.15 km)	792 yd (724 m)
EF1	This tornado damaged the roofs of buildings, trees, and street signs throughout Reese Center.						

=== June 6 event ===
List of confirmed tornadoes – Friday, June 6, 2025
EF#	Location	County / parish	State	Start coord.	Time (UTC)	Path length	Max. width
EF1	ENE of Kingfisher to ENE of Cimarron City	Kingfisher, Logan	OK	35.913°N 97.709°W	08:55–09:04	8.2 mi (13.2 km)	300 yd (270 m)
EF1	This tornado developed in Kingfisher County and moved east-southeast into Logan County, producing mostly minor tree damage along its path. As it progressed, it passed between Cimarron City and Crescent Springs, eventually turning east-northeast before dissipating. The most notable damage included snapped utility poles and a building with a damaged exterior door, but overall, the tornado primarily caused damage to trees.						
EF0	Southern Newcastle	McClain	OK	35.237°N 97.612°W	09:48–09:50	1.5 mi (2.4 km)	30 yd (27 m)
EF0	A fence was blown down, a trampoline was damaged and several trees were damaged.						
EF0	SE of Newcastle	McClain	OK	35.204°N 97.556°W	09:54–09:56	1.3 mi (2.1 km)	100 yd (91 m)
EF0	A very weak tornado caused minor damage to trees.						
EF0	E of Lexington	Cleveland	OK	35.026°N 97.284°W	10:28–10:32	2.4 mi (3.9 km)	200 yd (180 m)
EF0	One home suffered roof damage and trees were damaged.						
EF0	NW of Byars	McClain	OK	34.911°N 97.09°W	10:52–10:56	2.3 mi (3.7 km)	50 yd (46 m)
EF0	Scattered tree damage occurred.						
EF1	SE of Murphy to NNE of Peggs	Mayes, Cherokee	OK	36.0861°N 95.1784°W	10:56–11:02	4.8 mi (7.7 km)	300 yd (270 m)
EF1	This tornado destroyed a large barn and snapped or uprooted numerous trees.						
EF1	SSE of Onapa to S of Texanna	McIntosh	OK	35.3725°N 95.5333°W	11:22–11:29	5.6 mi (9.0 km)	300 yd (270 m)
EF1	Trees were uprooted and large tree limbs were snapped.						
EF1	Carlisle to Vian to NW of McKey	Sequoyah	OK	35.4966°N 95.0147°W	11:52–12:02	7.6 mi (12.2 km)	1,100 yd (1,000 m)
EF1	Barns and homes were damaged.						
EF1	SW of McKey to N of Sallisaw	Sequoyah	OK	35.4831°N 94.8753°W	12:04–12:07	3 mi (4.8 km)	650 yd (590 m)
EF1	Sporadic tree damage occurred.						
EF1	N of Sallisaw to S of Akins	Sequoyah	OK	35.4832°N 94.7681°W	12:12–12:17	4 mi (6.4 km)	650 yd (590 m)
EF1	Damage occurred primarily to trees.						
EF1	Wheaton to ESE of Fairview	Barry	MO	36.76°N 94.06°W	12:27–12:35	3.18 mi (5.12 km)	100 yd (91 m)
EF1	Multiple sections of roofing were torn off of poultry barns and trees were damaged.						
EF1	SW of Long to Northern Remy	Sequoyah	OK	35.4757°N 94.5659°W	12:31–12:35	3.6 mi (5.8 km)	900 yd (820 m)
EF1	Minor damage was done to the roof of the school, a power pole was damaged and several trees were damaged, a few of which were uprooted.						
EF0	Northern Fort Smith to Southern Van Buren	Sebastian, Crawford	AR	35.4105°N 94.3531°W	12:45–12:47	1.2 mi (1.9 km)	250 yd (230 m)
EF0	This tornado developed west of the Arkansas River before quickly crossing it and damaged a fabric and metal storage shelter and the roof of a nearby building.						
EF1	Van Buren	Crawford	AR	35.4298°N 94.3498°W	12:46–12:47	0.8 mi (1.3 km)	120 yd (110 m)
EF1	A brief tornado touched down in southern Van Buren and moved rapidly northeast. It damaged a commercial building and multiple homes in a residential area. One home losing its entire roof and another lost a significant portion of its roof.						
EF0	Eastern Van Buren	Crawford	AR	35.441°N 94.3135°W	12:49–12:51	1.1 mi (1.8 km)	550 yd (500 m)
EF0	This high-end EF0 tornado snapped large limbs from a few trees and inflicted minor damage to the roofs of homes.						
EFU	SSW of Keyes	Cimarron	OK	36.7764°N 102.264°W	23:54–23:56	0.8 mi (1.3 km)	25 yd (23 m)
EFU	A tornado was recorded by a storm chaser.						
EFU	NNW of Sundown	Hockley	TX	33.4634°N 102.5066°W	00:04	0.01 mi (0.016 km)	30 yd (27 m)
EFU	A brief tornado was reported in an open field.						
EFU	ESE of Sundown	Hockley	TX	33.4223°N 102.4199°W	00:15	0.01 mi (0.016 km)	30 yd (27 m)
EFU	This tornado briefly touched down in a field.						
EFU	S of Arnett	Hockley	TX	33.4302°N 102.3014°W	00:31	0.01 mi (0.016 km)	30 yd (27 m)
EFU	A brief tornado was reported.						
EFU	NE of Gruver	Hansford	TX	36.3023°N 101.3564°W	01:48–01:49	0.26 mi (0.42 km)	50 yd (46 m)
EFU	This very weak tornado caused some power lines to sway in a video recorded by a storm chaser.						
EF0	Spring Hill	Maury	TN	35.7378°N 86.9133°W	01:52–01:57	2.63 mi (4.23 km)	175 yd (160 m)
EF0	This tornado caused damage throughout a subdivision, primarily uprooting and snapping trees and breaking large branches. As it moved east, it crossed I-65 before dissipating. Some structures along the path experienced minor damage, including missing shingles, broken windows, torn fascia, and siding impacts from flying debris.						
EFU	W of Spearman	Hansford	TX	36.206°N 101.2361°W	02:06–02:11	1.81 mi (2.91 km)	75 yd (69 m)
EFU	A picture was taken of a tornado. No known damage occurred.						
EF2	SE of Spearman	Hansford, Hutchinson	TX	36.1732°N 101.1485°W	02:13–02:35	9.48 mi (15.26 km)	150 yd (140 m)
EF2	This low-end EF2 tornado snapped some power poles. It followed an unusual path direction, moving in a near southerly track.						
EFU	N of Boise City	Cimarron	OK	36.8383°N 102.5181°W	03:05–03:12	5.51 mi (8.87 km)	50 yd (46 m)
EFU	This tornado pushed a semi-truck into a ditch and caused no other damage as it remained over rural land.						
EFU	S of Allison	Wheeler	TX	35.4978°N 100.1188°W	04:20–04:22	0.92 mi (1.48 km)	25 yd (23 m)
EFU	A brief tornado was reported.						

=== June 7 event ===
List of confirmed tornadoes – Saturday, June 7, 2025
EF#	Location	County / parish	State	Start coord.	Time (UTC)	Path length	Max. width
EF0	N of Capron	Woods	OK	36.93°N 98.577°W	06:12	0.5 mi (0.80 km)	30 yd (27 m)
EF0	Minor tree damage occurred.						
EF1	NE of Jet	Alfalfa	OK	36.709°N 98.126°W	06:36	0.5 mi (0.80 km)	30 yd (27 m)
EF1	A hay barn was destroyed.						
EF1	Park Hill to Tenkiller	Cherokee	OK	35.8482°N 95.0227°W	10:13–10:22	9.3 mi (15.0 km)	2,000 yd (1,800 m)
EF1	A very large tornado caused minor damage to a few homes and uprooted or snapped numerous trees.						
EF1	Northern McAlester	Pittsburg	OK	34.9666°N 95.909°W	10:52–11:01	8.9 mi (14.3 km)	2,000 yd (1,800 m)
EF1	This large tornado caused damage throughout northern McAlester, including to the McAlester-Pittsburg County Emergency Operations Center.						
EF1	E of Odell to S of Blackburn	Washington	AR	35.768°N 94.364°W	10:59–11:07	8 mi (13 km)	900 yd (820 m)
EF1	Numerous trees were snapped or uprooted in and around Devil's Den State Park. Some trees fell onto buildings in the state park, causing damage.						
EF1	WNW of New Houlka	Chickasaw	MS	34.0676°N 89.1116°W	16:58–17:04	3.92 mi (6.31 km)	75 yd (69 m)
EF1	This weak tornado touched down in northwestern Chickasaw County, producing sporadic tree damage before striking a farm where several outbuildings and a barn were damaged. The most significant impacts occurred near MS 32 where a large barn lost major sections of its metal roof, which were carried several hundred yards. Nearby grain bins received minor damage and vehicles and equipment had windows shattered by debris. The tornado continued southeast along MS 32, snapping large tree branches and lofting a small carport before lifting just west of New Houlka.						
EF0	Southern Owensboro	Daviess	KY	37.7099°N 87.1271°W	20:55–21:01	2.14 mi (3.44 km)	25 yd (23 m)
EF0	A high-end EF0 tornado developed along US 431, damaging a billboard before moving northeast. It tore roofing from a strip mall and scattered shopping carts in a parking lot. The tornado then damaged the garden section of a home improvement store and caused window and door damage at a large furniture retail building. It crossed the US 60 and damaged part of the Owensboro Country Club, including the 14th hole on the course, before lifting.						
EF0	SSE of Boonville	Spencer	IN	37.9338°N 87.2426°W	21:30–21:32	0.59 mi (0.95 km)	25 yd (23 m)
EF0	Minor damage to tree branches and tree tops occurred.						
EF1	N of Fertile to S of Vineland	Jefferson	MO	38.1141°N 90.6799°W	00:05–00:14	4.88 mi (7.85 km)	300 yd (270 m)
EF1	A tornado primarily caused tree damage and minor structural impacts, with its most severe damage occurring at the start of the path where two homes were pushed off their foundations.						
EF0	Libertyville	St. Francois	MO	37.7087°N 90.3118°W	01:35–01:38	1.25 mi (2.01 km)	65 yd (59 m)
EF0	A barn lost a large portion of its roof, a house had its roof damaged and numerous trees were damaged.						
EF1	W of Shawneetown	Cape Girardeau	MO	37.5436°N 89.7253°W	02:52–02:57	3.55 mi (5.71 km)	50 yd (46 m)
EF1	This tornado damaged two pole barns, destroyed a large barn, and shifted a manufactured home several feet off its foundation. It crossed US 61 where it uprooted trees and removed the roof of another barn. Numerous additional trees along the path were either uprooted or had large limbs broken.						
EF1	NNE of Jackson	Cape Girardeau	MO	37.419°N 89.6194°W	03:23–03:25	1.64 mi (2.64 km)	125 yd (114 m)
EF1	A tornado caused significant tree damage south-southeast of Fruitland. Numerous trees were snapped or uprooted with additional limbs downed along the track. A couple of structures were damaged by falling trees. An unfinished house along Route Y had several of its walls knocked down and a few other buildings experienced roof and siding damage.						

=== June 8 event ===
List of confirmed tornadoes – Sunday, June 8, 2025
EF#	Location	County / parish	State	Start coord.	Time (UTC)	Path length	Max. width
EFU	SW of Felt, OK	Cimarron (OK), Dallam (TX)	OK, TX	36.5348°N 102.8699°W	19:48–20:17	9.38 mi (15.10 km)	100 yd (91 m)
EFU	A tornado remained over open grassland, flattening grass.						
EFU	WSW of Ware	Dallam	TX	36.1516°N 102.836°W	21:19–21:22	0.19 mi (0.31 km)	50 yd (46 m)
EFU	Storm chasers observed a very weak tornado in a field.						
EF0	Northern Borger	Hutchinson	TX	35.6878°N 101.4027°W	21:26–21:27	0.29 mi (0.47 km)	50 yd (46 m)
EF0	Minor shingle damage occurred to a home.						
EF1	SW of Ware	Dallam	TX	36.0813°N 102.8165°W	21:38–21:50	1.56 mi (2.51 km)	50 yd (46 m)
EF1	A tornado destroyed a barn.						
EFU	SSE of Goree	Knox	TX	33.4299°N 99.5001°W	00:58–01:00	0.5 mi (0.80 km)	100 yd (91 m)
EFU	A storm chaser observed a tornado.						
EF1	Southern Sherman	Grayson	TX	33.5774°N 96.6795°W	02:39–02:45	4 mi (6.4 km)	400 yd (370 m)
EF1	This tornado touched down and moved southeast, initially downing several trees and damaging a few barns. It caused more significant damage along its path, snapping and uprooting dozens of trees in multiple directions. Near the end of its track, a trailer was blown onto its side in a parking lot at the Texas Instruments plant before the tornado lifted.						
EF1	SW of Ravenna	Fannin	TX	33.6763°N 96.3095°W	02:48–02:54	4.29 mi (6.90 km)	300 yd (270 m)
EF1	A tornado touched down near FM 1753 and tracked southeast. It initially caused minor tree and home damage before intensifying, producing widespread tree damage, destroying a barn, and causing minor exterior damage to two homes. At peak intensity, it destroyed a mobile home, heavily damaged another mobile home and a barn, caused minor damage to additional homes, and snapped or uprooted dozens of trees. A horse trailer was also blown across a roadway. The tornado then moved through forested areas before dissipating.						
EF1	S of Ravenna to Bonham	Fannin	TX	33.6462°N 96.2468°W	02:55–03:04	7.01 mi (11.28 km)	500 yd (460 m)
EF1	This tornado touched down south of Ravenna, initially causing minor damage to a home and downing a few trees. It strengthened while moving southeast, snapping and uprooting numerous trees in rural areas and causing minor exterior damage to several homes and heavy damage to outbuildings. A small silo was lofted and carried over 300 yards (270 m) and cyclonic grass patterns were observed. As the tornado crossed US 82 and SH 121, it weakened briefly, causing minor structural damage and tossing sheds. Entering Bonham, the tornado re-intensified, downing hundreds of trees, damaging multiple homes, removing a church steeple, and collapsing a church wall. Southwest of the tornado, strong inflow winds caused roof damage to a store, school, and stadium scoreboard. The tornado transitioned into a downburst which continued causing tree and roof damage across Bonham.						

=== June 9 event ===
List of confirmed tornadoes – Monday, June 9, 2025
EF#	Location	County / parish	State	Start coord.	Time (UTC)	Path length	Max. width
EF0	Canadohta Lake	Crawford	PA	41.8089°N 79.8393°W	19:45–19:47	0.66 mi (1.06 km)	25 yd (23 m)
EF0	A waterspout moved onshore from Lake Canadohta. An old large tree fell on a roof, damaging it. Two power poles were knocked down, several other trees were downed, and tree limbs were broken.						
EF0	SE of Strattanville	Clarion	PA	41.1774°N 79.3066°W	21:27–21:28	0.23 mi (0.37 km)	25 yd (23 m)
EF0	A narrow swath of tree damage occurred. One tree fell onto a garage, destroying it.						
EF1	Lake Buckhorn	Holmes	OH	40.4686°N 81.9158°W	21:25–21:28	1.32 mi (2.12 km)	80 yd (73 m)
EF1	A barn sustained roof damage, a pontoon boat and dock were lifted from the water of Lake Buckhorn, and numerous trees up to 1–2 feet (0.3–0.6 m) were snapped and uprooted on either side of the lake.						
EF1	Great Valley to Humphrey	Cattaraugus	NY	42.228°N 78.601°W	21:37–21:41	2.4 mi (3.9 km)	600 yd (550 m)
EF1	A high-end EF1 tornado hit the Great Valley area. One house lost its roof and suffered significant damage to its second-story walls. Several outbuildings were destroyed and other houses sustained roof and siding damage. Numerous hardwood and softwood trees were snapped and uprooted.						
EF2	NW of Wattsburg	Erie	PA	42.0755°N 79.8903°W	21:49–21:52	1.04 mi (1.67 km)	115 yd (105 m)
EF2	A low-end EF2 tornado toppled a tree into a barn, destroying it, and destroyed another barn directly. Cars were heavily damaged and a trailer was overturned. Two horses and several cows were killed. A house lost siding, had broken windows, and lost a side door. Trees were damaged and knocked down.						
EF1	SW of Mount Carmel, SC	Elbert (GA), McCormick (SC)	GA, SC	33.973°N 82.585°W	23:09–23:11	1.54 mi (2.48 km)	200 yd (180 m)
EF1	This tornado touched down in Bobby Brown Park, snapping and uprooting dozens of trees and causing minor structural damage to pavilions at the recreational center. The tornado crossed the Savannah River into South Carolina, where additional tree damage was observed, though its full path is uncertain due to limited access on U.S. Army Corps of Engineers land.						
EFU	SE of Tarzan (1st tornado)	Martin	TX	32.26°N 101.94°W	23:39–23:46		25 yd (23 m)
EFU	The first of two simultaneous landspouts observed by an off-duty NWS employee. No damage was reported.						
EFU	SE of Tarzan (2nd tornado)	Martin	TX	32.26°N 101.94°W	23:39–23:46		25 yd (23 m)
EFU	The second of two simultaneous landspouts observed by an off-duty NWS employee. No damage was reported.						
EF1	S of Chapin	Lexington	SC	34.1229°N 81.4043°W	00:43–00:49	6.17 mi (9.93 km)	200 yd (180 m)
EF1	This tornado began on a peninsula of Lake Murray, snapping large limbs and producing substantial tree debris. As it moved northeast, it caused minor tree damage before inflicting more significant damage with dozens of trees uprooted or snapped. Additional tree damage occurred across adjacent peninsulas, with impacts near a park and continuing behind nearby residential areas. After crossing US 76, the tornado caused weak tree damage and minor damage to houses before lifting northeast of the area.						

=== June 10 event ===
List of confirmed tornadoes – Tuesday, June 10, 2025
EF#	Location	County / parish	State	Start coord.	Time (UTC)	Path length	Max. width
EF0	Beekmantown	Clinton	NY	44.763°N 73.497°W	19:38-19:40	0.52 mi (0.84 km)	100 yd (91 m)
EF0	Multiple trees were downed or uprooted on the southside of Beekmantown. Roof damage also occurred and a trampoline was tossed. This is only the second documented tornado in Clinton County since reliable records began in 1950, the first which occurred in 2004.						
EFU	E of Marfa	Presidio	TX	30.27°N 103.84°W	20:06-20:15		45 yd (41 m)
EFU	A storm chaser reported a landspout.						
EF0	NW of Meaux	Vermilion	LA	30.024°N 92.187°W	22:20	0.01 mi (0.016 km)	1 yd (0.91 m)
EF0	A landspout did minor damage to an outbuilding.						

=== June 11 event ===
List of confirmed tornadoes – Wednesday, June 11, 2025
EF#	Location	County / parish	State	Start coord.	Time (UTC)	Path length	Max. width
EFU	NW of Garrett	Albany	WY	42.1824°N 105.7951°W	00:01-00:02	0.1 mi (0.16 km)	10 yd (9.1 m)
EFU	A brief tornado touched down over open ranchland.						
EF0	WNW of Gholson	McLennan	TX	31.705°N 97.261°W	00:56-00:57	0.08 mi (0.13 km)	40 yd (37 m)
EF0	A very brief tornado damaged a property where several travel trailers and small outbuildings were moved. Part of the metal roof was peeled off a manufactured home and additional small sheds lost their metal roofs. Tree damage was also observed on the property.						

=== June 12 event ===
List of confirmed tornadoes – Thursday, June 12, 2025
EF#	Location	County / parish	State	Start coord.	Time (UTC)	Path length	Max. width
EF0	SSW of Wimberley	Hays	TX	29.9294°N 98.1253°W	06:02-06:05	1.36 mi (2.19 km)	50 yd (46 m)
EF0	Minor structure and tree damage occurred.						
EF0	S of Wimberley	Hays	TX	29.9208°N 98.092°W	06:06-06:08	0.58 mi (0.93 km)	75 yd (69 m)
EF0	Some trees were snapped or uprooted and large branches were broken.						
EF0	N of Burr	Wharton	TX	29.3055°N 95.9971°W	08:05-08:10	2.15 mi (3.46 km)	50 yd (46 m)
EF0	An older shed had its roof blown off and minor tree damage occurred.						
EF1	NE of Wharton	Wharton	TX	29.33°N 96.052°W	08:20-08:28	1.65 mi (2.66 km)	130 yd (120 m)
EF1	This tornado touched down northeast of Wharton and moved eastward, causing significant roof damage to multiple homes in a residential area and snapping large tree branches. As it progressed, the tornado continued to produce mostly tree damage and minor roof impacts before dissipating.						
EF0	George West	Live Oak	TX	28.33°N 98.11°W	11:39	0.6 mi (0.97 km)	50 yd (46 m)
EF0	This weak tornado damaged two porches, snapped tree limbs, and downed a tree onto a truck.						
EF1	NW of Hillsdale	Laramie	WY	41.36°N 104.64°W	20:50-20:52	2.2 mi (3.5 km)	10 yd (9.1 m)
EF1	A horse trailer was thrown and rolled a third of a mile, fencing was damaged, and tree limbs were downed.						
EF0	N of Jacksonville to WSW of Cabot	Pulaski	AR	34.9294°N 92.1315°W	20:53-20:57	2.26 mi (3.64 km)	75 yd (69 m)
EF0	A weak tornado occurred just north of Little Rock Air Force Base, knocking down several large tree limbs.						
EFU	SE of Carlisle	Prairie	AR	34.7335°N 91.6975°W	21:30-21:32	0.38 mi (0.61 km)	20 yd (18 m)
EFU	This brief tornado remained over farmland.						

=== June 13 event ===
List of confirmed tornadoes – Friday, June 13, 2025
EF#	Location	County / parish	State	Start coord.	Time (UTC)	Path length	Max. width
EF0	Western Evansville	Vanderburgh	IN	37.9732°N 87.6195°W	21:09-21:11	1.29 mi (2.08 km)	25 yd (23 m)
EF0	Trees were uprooted, large tree limbs were downed, and a construction barricade was knocked over.						
EFU	NNE of Potter	Cheyenne	NE	41.2562°N 103.2981°W	01:04–01:05	0.1 mi (0.16 km)	10 yd (9.1 m)
EFU	Storm spotters and chasers photographed and recorded a brief, intermittent tornado.						
EFU	NE of Potter	Cheyenne	NE	41.2552°N 103.278°W	01:10–01:11	0.1 mi (0.16 km)	10 yd (9.1 m)
EFU	A storm chaser reported a very brief tornado.						
EFU	SE of Potter	Cheyenne	NE	41.1847°N 103.2833°W	01:24–01:25	0.1 mi (0.16 km)	10 yd (9.1 m)
EFU	A spotter and storm chaser reported a brief tornado that caused no damage.						

=== June 14 event ===
List of confirmed tornadoes – Saturday, June 14, 2025
EF#	Location	County / parish	State	Start coord.	Time (UTC)	Path length	Max. width
EF0	SE of Thomas	Custer	OK	35.7091°N 98.6996°W	02:40	0.4 mi (0.64 km)	50 yd (46 m)
EF0	A dusty tornado caused no damage.						

=== June 16 event ===
List of confirmed tornadoes – Monday, June 16, 2025
EF#	Location	County / parish	State	Start coord.	Time (UTC)	Path length	Max. width
EFU	E of Clitherall	Otter Tail	MN	46.27°N 95.62°W	19:13–19:14	0.31 mi (0.50 km)	50 yd (46 m)
EFU	A brief tornado was observed by storm chasers with no known damage occurring.						
EFU	SE of Dent	Otter Tail	MN	46.53°N 95.68°W	19:40–19:45	0.57 mi (0.92 km)	50 yd (46 m)
EFU	Multiple photographs were taken of a waterspout over Marion Lake.						
EF1	N of Casino to SE of Lake Shore	Cass, Crow Wing	MN	46.4301°N 94.5437°W	21:21–21:43	11.46 mi (18.44 km)	400 yd (370 m)
EF1	This tornado progressed to the north of the Pillsbury State Forest, eventually crossing Gull Lake before dissipating. A garage was heavily damaged, a pontoon boat flipped, an aluminumn dock was tossed and several trees were uprooted or snapped.						
EF1	NW of Legionville to W of Ironton	Crow Wing	MN	46.4674°N 94.2322°W	21:46–22:12	10.9 mi (17.5 km)	900 yd (820 m)
EF1	Numerous trees were snapped or uprooted.						
EFU	SSE of Flagler	Kit Carson	CO	39.155°N 102.9776°W	22:44–22:45	0.01 mi (0.016 km)	10 yd (9.1 m)
EFU	A landspout was reported by several people.						
EFU	E of New Ulm	Nicollet	MN	44.3143°N 94.3642°W	23:31–23:32	0.24 mi (0.39 km)	25 yd (23 m)
EFU	A storm chaser recorded a tornado remaining over fields.						
EF0	ESE of Nicollet	Nicollet	MN	44.2665°N 94.1473°W	23:58–00:01	1.26 mi (2.03 km)	50 yd (46 m)
EF0	A few tree branches were downed at a farmstead.						
EF1	E of Dickens	Lincoln	NE	40.838°N 100.896°W	00:04–00:12	0.83 mi (1.34 km)	50 yd (46 m)
EF1	This tornado began as a landspout before evolving into a supercellular tornado, bending road signs, snapping large tree branches and several trees in a shelterbelt.						
EF2	ESE of Dickens	Lincoln	NE	40.822°N 100.939°W	00:20–01:05	3.06 mi (4.92 km)	50 yd (46 m)
EF2	A strong and long-lived flipped irrigation pivots and snapped numerous trees and power lines. It was documented by numerous storm chasers throughout its lifetime.						

=== June 17 event ===
List of confirmed tornadoes – Tuesday, June 17, 2025
EF#	Location	County / parish	State	Start coord.	Time (UTC)	Path length	Max. width
EF0	Cantonment	Escambia	FL	30.6043°N 87.3517°W	16:41-16:42	0.14 mi (0.23 km)	5 yd (4.6 m)
EF0	A small, short-lived tornado moved through the Twin Pines community in Cantonment. It snapped a small tree, caused minor fence damage, and scattered loose debris. A video captured the narrow vortex as it moved through the area and disappeared into a nearby tree line.						
EF1	ESE of Laramie	Albany	WY	41.2898°N 105.4499°W	18:25-18:30	1.6 mi (2.6 km)	450 yd (410 m)
EF1	Numerous pine trees were snapped or uprooted along a trail for Pilot Hill.						
EF1	NE of Divide	Teller	CO	38.9663°N 105.132°W	18:41-18:45	0.43 mi (0.69 km)	150 yd (140 m)
EF1	This high-altitude tornado developed north-northeast of Divide and quickly caused extensive damage to a fifteen acre area of softwood and hardwood trees, snapping and uprooting many of them. The most severe damage, marked by clear convergent and cyclonic patterns, indicated peak winds of up to 106 mph (171 km/h). As the tornado continued east, it uprooted more trees before lifting shortly after crossing a nearby road.						
EFU	N of Hettinger	Adams	ND	46.0833°N 102.652°W	19:38-19:40	0.93 mi (1.50 km)	50 yd (46 m)
EFU	This tornado touched down in an open field and impacted no structures.						
EF0	SSW of Bushnell	Kimball	NE	41.0942°N 103.9548°W	20:15-20:16	0.1 mi (0.16 km)	10 yd (9.1 m)
EF0	A center irrigation pivot was flipped.						
EFU	NW of Manville	Niobrara	WY	42.7898°N 104.629°W	20:35-20:36	0.1 mi (0.16 km)	10 yd (9.1 m)
EFU	This brief tornado was photographed.						
EFU	NNW of Lusk	Niobrara	WY	42.7904°N 104.469°W	20:50-20:51	0.1 mi (0.16 km)	10 yd (9.1 m)
EFU	A persistent funnel intermittently touched down and was observed by an emergency manager.						
EFU	ENE of Glenrock	Converse	WY	42.8758°N 105.7817°W	21:03-21:05	0.1 mi (0.16 km)	10 yd (9.1 m)
EFU	A landspout tornado was documented.						
EF0	SSW of Harper	Harper	KS	37.2391°N 98.0398°W	21:25-21:28	0.06 mi (0.097 km)	10 yd (9.1 m)
EF0	This brief tornado pulled two stop signs out of the ground and snapped an ad bulletin sign.						
EF1	NE of Artemas	Bedford	PA	39.7869°N 78.363°W	22:09-22:11	1.06 mi (1.71 km)	175 yd (160 m)
EF1	Multiple trees were snapped or uprooted.						
EFU	SSE of Alliance	Morrill	NE	41.9809°N 102.8285°W	23:40-23:41	0.1 mi (0.16 km)	10 yd (9.1 m)
EFU	A landspout tornado occurred in an open field.						
EF2	SW of Arnett to N of Crawford	Ellis, Roger Mills	OK	36.005°N 99.999°W	01:06-01:27	14.3 mi (23.0 km)	1,200 yd (1,100 m)
EF2	This large rain-wrapped tornado began near the Texas state line and moved southeast through southwestern Ellis County, causing extensive roof damage to a home and barn, snapping and debarking trees near Little Robe Creek, and further scattering the remains of a wildfire-damaged home before downing power lines and continuing toward the Canadian River. After crossing into Roger Mills County, it moved through the Antelope Hills, where it snapped and partially debarked numerous trees, damaged two oil-field outbuildings, snapped power poles, damaged another barn, and finally dissipated after continuing south-southeast.						
EF1	SW of Arnett	Ellis	OK	36.018°N 99.954°W	01:07-01:10	1.8 mi (2.9 km)	50 yd (46 m)
EF1	Two barns and several trees were damaged.						
EFU	NNW of Crawford	Roger Mills	OK	35.99°N 99.84°W	01:16-01:17	1 mi (1.6 km)	30 yd (27 m)
EFU	A tornado was observed.						
EF0	ENE of Jet	Alfalfa	OK	36.679°N 98.138°W	02:39-02:42	2.2 mi (3.5 km)	40 yd (37 m)
EF0	A barn was damaged.						
EFU	NW of Isabella	Major	OK	36.2639°N 98.3858°W	02:52-02:55	2 mi (3.2 km)	30 yd (27 m)
EFU	A small tornado that didn't cause damage was observed.						
EFU	SW of Pond Creek	Grant	OK	36.5984°N 97.8893°W	02:53-02:55	1 mi (1.6 km)	30 yd (27 m)
EFU	Storms spotters reported a tornado.						

=== June 18 event ===
List of confirmed tornadoes – Wednesday, June 18, 2025
EF#	Location	County / parish	State	Start coord.	Time (UTC)	Path length	Max. width
EF1	Pryor	Mayes	OK	36.301°N 95.303°W	05:36–05:41	4.3 mi (6.9 km)	350 yd (320 m)
EF1	A tornado developed on the east side of Pryor and moved northeast across SH 20, damaging a metal building and tearing part of the roof off a funeral home. Numerous trees were uprooted or snapped along its path. Further northeast, it caused roof damage to a home, destroyed or damaged several outbuildings, and snapped large tree limbs before dissipating.						
EF1	SSW of Boatman to Pump Back to SE of Wickliffe	Mayes	OK	36.244°N 95.189°W	05:42–05:52	8.2 mi (13.2 km)	750 yd (690 m)
EF1	This tornado tracked east-northeast, snapping large limbs and uprooting trees as it tracked across rural Mayes County. After crossing Lake Hudson and SH 82, it continued northeast, causing additional tree damage before dissipating. The most significant impacts occurred near and east of the lake, where numerous trees were damaged.						
EF1	E of Shady Grove to NW of Tahlequah	Cherokee	OK	35.94°N 95.055°W	05:53–05:55	1.8 mi (2.9 km)	700 yd (640 m)
EF1	Numerous trees were uprooted and an outbuilding was damaged.						
EF1	Northern Tahlequah to S of Sparrowhawk	Cherokee	OK	35.954°N 95.015°W	05:56–06:02	6.9 mi (11.1 km)	600 yd (550 m)
EF1	Hundreds of trees were snapped or uprooted, some of which fell onto homes.						
EF1	E of Langley	Delaware	OK	36.461°N 94.988°W	05:59–00:04	3.7 mi (6.0 km)	700 yd (640 m)
EF1	This QLCS-embedded tornado uprooted and snapped many trees along its path, damaged three power poles when fallen trees pulled down lines, caused minor damage to a few homes mostly from tree impacts, and overturned a poultry house.						
EF1	S of Sparrowhawk to Eldon to NNE of Titanic	Cherokee, Adair	OK	35.941°N 94.889°W	06:04–06:12	7.7 mi (12.4 km)	1,000 yd (910 m)
EF1	Several trees were uprooted or snapped. A small portion of the trees fell onto residences.						
EF1	NE of Titanic to West Peavine to ENE of Baron	Adair	OK	35.918°N 94.731°W	06:14–06:24	8.8 mi (14.2 km)	750 yd (690 m)
EF1	An outbuilding was destroyed and numerous trees were damaged or uprooted.						
EF1	NE of Maysville to WSW of Sulphur Springs	Benton	AR	36.434°N 94.564°W	06:20–06:24	3.2 mi (5.1 km)	800 yd (730 m)
EF1	Numerous trees were uprooted.						
EF1	Northern Highfill	Benton	AR	36.306°N 94.352°W	06:29–06:32	1.7 mi (2.7 km)	300 yd (270 m)
EF1	This tornado began in a rural area where it uprooted trees before moving northeast and causing severe damage to several chicken houses. It then entered a subdivision, where multiple homes sustained significant roof damage and others experienced minor impacts. As it continued east-northeast, it uprooted additional trees before dissipating.						
EF1	NE of West Fork	Washington	AR	35.939°N 94.161°W	06:54–06:58	2.3 mi (3.7 km)	300 yd (270 m)
EF1	A couple outbuildings were severely damaged, multiple trees were uprooted, and numerous large tree limbs were snapped.						
EF1	NW of Kissenger, MO to SSE of Clarksville, MO	Pike (MO), Calhoun (IL)	MO, IL	39.314°N 90.8862°W	15:55–15:59	3.56 mi (5.73 km)	100 yd (91 m)
EF1	A tornado touched down and immediately damaged numerous trees, snapping large tree branches and uprooting others. It crossed the Mississippi River into Illinois, dissipating shortly after reaching land.						
EFU	WNW of Glasgow	Scott	IL	39.5648°N 90.5376°W	16:30–16:32	1.48 mi (2.38 km)	10 yd (9.1 m)
EFU	A narrow tornado damaged crops.						
EF0	ESE of Lynnville to Southern Jacksonville	Morgan	IL	39.6636°N 90.2933°W	16:53–16:59	4.66 mi (7.50 km)	80 yd (73 m)
EF0	This tornado mainly damaged trees and tree branches before it dissipated over a cemetery.						
EF1	WNW of Lynnville	Scott, Morgan	IL	39.6884°N 90.3781°W	16:54–16:56	1.03 mi (1.66 km)	50 yd (46 m)
EF1	A home had its roof damaged and power lines were downed with this brief tornado.						
EF1	Northwestern Jacksonville	Morgan	IL	39.7346°N 90.2735°W	17:02–17:10	3.85 mi (6.20 km)	75 yd (69 m)
EF1	This tornado touched down within Jacksonville, damaging a sports complex, tossing debris from this location across the adjacent street. After exiting town, it damaged trees and destroyed multiple outbuildings before lifting in the northwestern corner of the Jacksonville Municipal Airport.						
EF2	N of Jacksonville to SE of Old Princeton	Morgan	IL	39.7841°N 90.2126°W	17:07–17:19	6.87 mi (11.06 km)	300 yd (270 m)
EF2	A strong tornado developed, snapping numerous trees and rolling a camper van. The tornado then reached its peak strength at mid-range EF2 intensity as it significantly damaged a farm complex. A barn was demolished and numerous outbuildings were obliterated. The tornado then weakened as it progressed to the northeast, passing close to Literberry, before eventually dissipating just south of the Morgan-Cass county line.						
EF1	NNW of Alexander to SSE of Ashland	Morgan	IL	39.7689°N 90.0478°W	17:15–17:21	7.61 mi (12.25 km)	50 yd (46 m)
EF1	This tornado damaged a few trees and remained over farm fields for most of its life.						
EF1	WNW of Berlin to NNW of Loyd	Sangamon, Menard	IL	39.82°N 89.92°W	17:25–17:38	7.4 mi (11.9 km)	200 yd (180 m)
EF1	Numerous trees were damaged and grain bins were tossed along the path. Near the end of its lifetime, numerous additional trees were damaged and shingles were removed from a roof of a house before it dissipated.						
EFU	NW of Ashland	Cass	IL	39.9189°N 90.0439°W	17:29–17:31	1.45 mi (2.33 km)	10 yd (9.1 m)
EFU	This tornado tracked only through farm fields, causing no damage.						
EFU	SSE of Newmansville	Cass, Menard	IL	39.9734°N 90.0088°W	17:37–17:43	2.96 mi (4.76 km)	10 yd (9.1 m)
EFU	A tornado tracked through farm fields, causing no known damage.						
EF1	NNE of Tallula to W of Petersburg	Menard	IL	39.9934°N 89.9182°W	17:41–17:44	1.41 mi (2.27 km)	200 yd (180 m)
EF1	Numerous trees were uprooted or had their branches snapped and two homes had their roof shingles removed.						
EF0	Odenton	Anne Arundel	MD	39.059°N 76.701°W	18:15–18:16	0.15 mi (0.24 km)	75 yd (69 m)
EF0	A brief tornado touched down in a residential community, initially uprooting two trees near a water retention pond. As it continued southeast, it tore shingles and siding from three homes, snapped large sections of trees, toppling at least two trees onto houses. One of the toppled trees crushed a backyard deck. The tornado then damaged three more homes by removing attic windows, damaging siding, and uprooting additional trees before lifting.						
EF0	NE of Mason City	Mason	IL	40.2319°N 89.675°W	18:18–18:20	0.08 mi (0.13 km)	100 yd (91 m)
EF0	A very brief tornado knocked over a tree before dissipating.						
EF1	NW of Parnell to SSW of Watkins	DeWitt	IL	40.2387°N 88.7653°W	18:50–18:55	3.55 mi (5.71 km)	100 yd (91 m)
EF1	A farm outbuilding was completely destroyed and multiple trees were toppled across the path. Another farmstead had its roof heavily damaged and a tree fell onto the roof of a house near the end of the path.						
EFU	NNE of Hopedale	Tazewell	IL	40.4548°N 89.4015°W	18:56–18:57	0.21 mi (0.34 km)	50 yd (46 m)
EFU	A storm chaser observed a very brief tornado that lasted forty-five seconds.						
EF0	NE of Black Rock	Tippecanoe	IN	40.38°N 87.07°W	19:02–19:03	0.56 mi (0.90 km)	30 yd (27 m)
EF0	The roof of a home was damaged and some trees were impacted as well.						
EF0	NNW of West Lafayette	Tippecanoe	IN	40.4883°N 86.9314°W	19:10–19:11	0.34 mi (0.55 km)	20 yd (18 m)
EF0	Mainly tree damaged was noted from this narrow, brief tornado.						
EFU	SSW of Bellflower	McLean	IL	40.3274°N 88.536°W	19:13–19:14	0.1 mi (0.16 km)	30 yd (27 m)
EFU	A rope tornado was captured by broadcast media. No damage was reported.						
EF0	Fraser	Macomb	MI	42.5341°N 82.9476°W	21:02–21:10	2.36 mi (3.80 km)	400 yd (370 m)
EF0	A weak tornado began in a residential neighborhood, where it damaged approximately fifteen to twenty homes, mainly by blowing shingles off roofs. One house lost a portion of its roof entirely. Numerous trees were also damaged in this area. As the tornado tracked northward, it continued to cause additional tree damage before dissipating just south of Metro Parkway.						
EFU	SSE of Elmer	Jackson	OK	34.4966°N 99.3013°W	23:10-23:20	1 mi (1.6 km)	20 yd (18 m)
EFU	A landspout was recorded.						
EF0	N of Elmore to WSW of Rocky Ridge	Ottawa	OH	41.5175°N 83.2828°W	23:44–45	0.54 mi (0.87 km)	10 yd (9.1 m)
EF0	A brief tornado touched down along SR 163, damaging a metal outbuilding and destroying a grain silo. It continued across the road, damaging the roof of a residence and snapping a few trees. Debris was scattered into a nearby field before the tornado lifted shortly afterward.						
EF0	NE of Rocky Ridge to NNE of Oak Harbor	Ottawa	OH	41.5496°N 83.1686°W	23:50–23:54	2.93 mi (4.72 km)	10 yd (9.1 m)
EF0	This tornado touched down in a rural area and moved east, causing minor tree damage, including one tree that fell onto a house. Another home sustained minor roof and facade damage and had a window shattered. As the tornado tracked northeast, it continued to break tree branches and later partially tore the roof off a small barn before dissipating.						
EF1	S of Collins to NNW of Kipton	Huron, Lorain	OH	41.2491°N 82.488°W	00:26–00:36	9.26 mi (14.90 km)	200 yd (180 m)
EF1	This tornado began south of Collins near US 20, primarily causing tree damage with numerous hardwood and softwood trees snapped. Some of these fell onto homes, resulting in minor structural damage. As it moved northeast, it continued to down trees north of US 20 and near SR 60, where it entered Lorain County near the Firelands Boy Scout Reservation, causing additional roof damage to a home and bringing down more trees before dissipating.						
EF0	SSE of Centerville to W of Williamsport	Hickman	TN	35.6788°N 87.4327°W	01:37–01:59	6.94 mi (11.17 km)	175 yd (160 m)
EF0	A tornado touched down southeast of Sunrise, initially causing minor tree damage. As it moved east, it damaged the roof of a mobile home and shifted it off its foundation. The tornado continued through a heavily wooded area, snapping and uprooting numerous trees and damaging a residence near a ridgetop. It weakened further east, with only scattered tree branches noted before dissipating.						
EF0	N of Lafayette	Macon	TN	36.5962°N 86.0543°W	01:37–01:42	4.34 mi (6.98 km)	300 yd (270 m)
EF0	A few residences and carports were damaged along with several trees.						

=== June 19 event ===
List of confirmed tornadoes – Thursday, June 19, 2025
EF#	Location	County / parish	State	Start coord.	Time (UTC)	Path length	Max. width
EF1	SW of Dickinson	Stark	ND	46.77°N 102.91°W	00:22–00:24	1.38 mi (2.22 km)	200 yd (180 m)
EF1	A tornado caused damage along a short path, partially tearing the roofs off two houses and snapping a large branch from a tree. Additional impacts included downed fencing, ripped siding, and two power poles knocked over near the southern end of the damage track.						
EF0	E of Hillside Colony	Spink	SD	44.74°N 97.98°W	03:50	0.01 mi (0.016 km)	10 yd (9.1 m)
EF0	A storm chaser spotted a brief, weak tornado. No damage was noted.						

=== June 20 event ===
List of confirmed tornadoes – Friday, June 20, 2025
EF#	Location	County / parish	State	Start coord.	Time (UTC)	Path length	Max. width
EFU	SSW of Spiritwood	Stutsman	ND		01:34–01:38	1.14 mi (1.83 km)	50 yd (46 m)
EFU	A brief tornado occurred, causing no damage.						
EFU	NNW of New Salem	Morton	ND		01:40–01:41	0.5 mi (0.80 km)	50 yd (46 m)
EFU	This tornado occurred in an open field and impacted no structures.						
EF2	NE of New Salem to SSE of Center	Morton	ND		01:48–01:59	5.62 mi (9.04 km)	200 yd (180 m)
EF2	This tornado damaged three farmsteads after tracking east-northeast from New Salem. The first farmstead had minimal damage. Two separate farm buildings on the second farm lost their roofs and a grain bin was severely damaged. The third farmstead had a damaged roof to the main house as well as one of the farm buildings. A mile of power poles were broken or leaned over in between the second and third farms. A wind turbine was also snapped and toppled near the bottom of the support pole.						
EF3	E of Spiritwood	Stutsman, Barnes	ND		01:51–02:20	10.94 mi (17.61 km)	990 yd (910 m)
EF3	See section on this tornado.						
EF1	NW of Dickey	LaMoure	ND		02:05–02:07	0.23 mi (0.37 km)	150 yd (140 m)
EF1	Two farm buildings were damaged and significant tree damage was noted near the touchdown of the tornado. Two ice fishing houses were also damaged and a grain cart with 120 bushels of corn was tossed end over end.						
EF0	SSW of Sanborn	Barnes	ND		02:05–02:23	1.05 mi (1.69 km)	20 yd (18 m)
EF0	A photogenic, anticyclonic tornado caused no damage over open land.						
EFU	NE of Sanger	McLean	ND		02:26–02:27	0.35 mi (0.56 km)	50 yd (46 m)
EFU	A brief tornado occurred in an open field causing no known damage.						
EF2	SW of Valley City	Barnes	ND		02:29–02:50	5.79 mi (9.32 km)	400 yd (370 m)
EF2	This strong tornado initially caused tree damage with large broken branches before intensifying near several homes. Two homes sustained minor shingle, roof, and siding damage, while one had a collapsed garage and partial porch roof loss. After crossing a ridge near the Sheyenne River, the tornado caused widespread tree damage and struck up to four more homes south of Valley City. One home suffered the most severe damage, with collapsed exterior top-floor walls, total roof destruction, and the complete collapse of a garage. A nearby carport and shed were also partially collapsed. Another home had roof and siding damage with one exterior wall pushed inward. Additional nearby homes experienced window, siding, and shingle damage. Tree damage continued in the area with numerous fallen branches before the tornado lifted.						
EF1	NE of Tappen to NNW of Medina	Kidder, Stutsman	ND		03:07–03:19	12.51 mi (20.13 km)	200 yd (180 m)
EF1	A QLCS tornado tracked east-northeast, snapping numerous trees down to the trunk, stripping them of leaves and branches. Power transmission towers were bent and twisted. One farm building sustained roof damage while another was completely destroyed. Several homes experienced shingle, siding, garage, and roof damage with debris scattered across properties and found up to half a mile away. Grain bins were dented and a semi trailer was tipped onto its side.						
EFU	W of Fort Ransom	LaMoure	ND		03:10–03:11	0.48 mi (0.77 km)	50 yd (46 m)
EFU	A tornado was photographed and posted on social media. No known damage occurred.						
EF2	NW of Fort Ransom	Ransom	ND		03:20–03:29	5.2 mi (8.4 km)	400 yd (370 m)
EF2	The tornado began by damaging three power poles as it tracked northeast. Around the same time, the tornado picked up multiple pieces of large farm machinery, carrying them for up to a half mile. Turning back northwest, it struck a farmhouse and a grove of trees, causing low-end EF2 damage. As it weakened and roped out, it damaged another power pole northwest of the farmstead before dissipating.						
EFU	NNW of Fort Ransom	Ransom	ND		03:22–03:25	0.6 mi (0.97 km)	50 yd (46 m)
EFU	A satellite tornado to the Fort Ransom EF2 left notable scarring through a field on high-resolution satellite imagery.						
EF0	SW of Hunter to SW of Grandin	Cass	ND		03:36–03:44	8.56 mi (13.78 km)	100 yd (91 m)
EF0	Several trees were damaged in shelterbelts and ground scouring was noted.						
EF1	N of Hunter	Cass	ND		03:38–03:44	5.82 mi (9.37 km)	300 yd (270 m)
EF1	Multiple trees were damaged.						
EF1	ESE of Arthur to E of Gardner	Cass	ND		03:41–03:51	12.17 mi (19.59 km)	800 yd (730 m)
EF1	Several shelterbelts and bean fields sustained damage and a farmstead lost several grain bins, a shed and a machine shop while the house on the property sustained roof damage.						
EF1	NNE of Bordulac to SW of Grace City	Foster	ND		03:44–03:51	5.79 mi (9.32 km)	150 yd (140 m)
EF1	This tornado touched downand traveled northeast, severely damaging a farmstead at the start of its path. A barn lost its entire upper wooden and sheet-metal section, a silo had its top torn off, and multiple barns lost roofs and doors. The tornado crossed open fields before hitting another farmstead, where many trees were broken and large branches were twisted off, including one driven into a camper. Nearby, power lines were brought down and part of a large shop building housing equipment was torn away before the tornado lifted.						
EF5	E of Enderlin	Ransom, Cass	ND		04:04–04:20	12.1 mi (19.5 km)	1,850 yd (1,690 m)
EF5	3 deaths – See article on this tornado.						
EF1	N of Oriska	Barnes	ND		04:17–04:22	5.01 mi (8.06 km)	800 yd (730 m)
EF1	Two farmsteads sustained damage to several buildings, and ground scouring occurred in fields.						
EF2	NE of Enderlin to WSW of Leonard	Cass, Ransom	ND		04:22–04:34	6.82 mi (10.98 km)	1,351 yd (1,235 m)
EF2	The same supercell that produced the EF5 tornado cycled and produced a strong tornado that caused extensive tree damage; several trees were snapped or uprooted in the affected area. Additionally, several roofs were partially destroyed. It formed just to the east of the path of the EF5 tornado, although they were not on the ground at the same time.						
EF0	N of Sheldon	Ransom	ND		04:35–04:37	0.84 mi (1.35 km)	20 yd (18 m)
EF0	A tornado scar was noted through farm fields on high-resolution satellite imagery.						
EF1	NE of Leonard to W of Kindred	Cass	ND		04:44–04:51	6.86 mi (11.04 km)	300 yd (270 m)
EF1	Some tree damage occurred.						
EF0	NE of Leonard	Cass	ND		04:45–04:46	0.68 mi (1.09 km)	10 yd (9.1 m)
EF0	This tornado left a scar that was discovered on high-resolution satellite imagery.						
EF0	SW of Davenport	Cass	ND		04:46–04:47	1.86 mi (2.99 km)	20 yd (18 m)
EF0	A tornado left a scar that was noted on high-resolution satellite imagery.						
EF0	WNW of Kindred	Cass	ND		04:50–04:51	0.74 mi (1.19 km)	20 yd (18 m)
EF0	A scar left by a tornado was found on high-resolution satellite imagery.						

=== June 22 event ===
List of confirmed tornadoes – Sunday, June 22, 2025
EF#	Location	County / parish	State	Start coord.	Time (UTC)	Path length	Max. width
EF1	Clark Mills to N of Clinton	Oneida	NY	43.0928°N 75.3669°W	07:58–08:03	2.43 mi (3.91 km)	300 yd (270 m)
EF1	3 deaths – See section on this tornado						
EF1	Lairdsville to Franklin Springs	Oneida	NY	43.0897°N 75.4404°W	07:59–08:10	4.74 mi (7.63 km)	450 yd (410 m)
EF1	Another spin-up tornado was spawned by the early morning line of severe thunderstorms and was on the ground simultaneously with the EF1 tornado above. It touched down just south of Westmoreland where tree branches were broken, quickly moving into Lairdsville where roofs were damaged. It continued through more rural areas, causing significant damage to farm silo and outbuildings in addition to snapping or uprooting trees. Continuing southeast, it snapped trees on the western edge of the Hamilton College campus before turning more sharply southeast and dissipating.						
EF1	NNE of Grygla	Beltrami	MN	48.4°N 95.56°W	00:17–00:27	5.36 mi (8.63 km)	300 yd (270 m)
EF1	A swath of tree damage was noted on high-resolution satellite imagery.						
EF1	SSE of Winner	Beltrami	MN	48.44°N 95.39°W	00:33–00:45	6.57 mi (10.57 km)	400 yd (370 m)
EF1	Trees were twisted in every direction near Gates Corner, blocking a road. A damage swatch of trees in Beltrami Island State Forest was noted on high-resolution satellite imagery.						

=== June 24 event ===
List of confirmed tornadoes – Tuesday, June 24, 2025
EF#	Location	County / parish	State	Start coord.	Time (UTC)	Path length	Max. width
EFU	ESE of Archer	Merrick	NE	41.15°N 98.07°W	23:20		
EFU	A landspout occurred over an open field.						

=== June 25 event ===
List of confirmed tornadoes – Wednesday, June 25, 2025
EF#	Location	County / parish	State	Start coord.	Time (UTC)	Path length	Max. width
EF0	S of Baroda	Faribault, Freeborn	MN	43.6721°N 93.6676°W	20:39–20:43	1.79 mi (2.88 km)	25 yd (23 m)
EF0	A couple of trees were damaged.						
EF0	S of Freeborn	Freeborn	MN	43.7533°N 93.5816°W	20:43–20:45	1.51 mi (2.43 km)	25 yd (23 m)
EF0	Cornfields were damaged on either side of Freeborn Lake. A few branches were downed on the east side of the lake.						
EF0	NW of Alden to SSE of Freeborn	Freeborn	MN	43.719°N 93.6035°W	20:49–20:55	3.29 mi (5.29 km)	25 yd (23 m)
EF0	A few large branches were downed at an old farmstead.						
EF0	WNW of Freeborn	Freeborn	MN	43.7745°N 93.623°W	21:15–21:18	1.71 mi (2.75 km)	25 yd (23 m)
EF0	A grove of trees along a creek were damaged.						
EF1	NE of Freeborn to NE of Hartland	Freeborn	MN	43.7887°N 93.5378°W	21:29–21:40	5.17 mi (8.32 km)	25 yd (23 m)
EF1	A farm was struck and damaged and power poles were downed.						
EF1	S of Bratsberg to W of Sheldon	Fillmore, Houston	MN	43.65°N 91.77°W	22:18–22:31	6.53 mi (10.51 km)	75 yd (69 m)
EF1	The roof of an outbuilding and numerous trees were damaged.						
EF1	S of Oak Center	Wabasha	MN	44.31°N 92.4°W	22:51–22:53	1.77 mi (2.85 km)	150 yd (140 m)
EF1	A mobile home had its roof ripped off, farm implements were knocked on their side, a barn was heavily damaged and several trees were damaged.						
EF0	NNE of Nodine	Winona	MN	43.93°N 91.45°W	22:54–22:57	1.44 mi (2.32 km)	25 yd (23 m)
EF0	Some tree limbs were snapped.						
EF0	SSW of Hokah	Houston	MN	43.7°N 91.4°W	22:59–23:03	1.12 mi (1.80 km)	20 yd (18 m)
EF0	A very brief tornado damaged a few pine trees.						
EF0	N of West Albany to SSE of Lake City	Wabasha	MN	44.36°N 92.3°W	23:02–23:08	2.7 mi (4.3 km)	20 yd (18 m)
EF0	A very weak tornado was recorded doing almost no damage to a grove of trees.						
EF1	Northwestern Pinellas Park to Southeastern Largo	Pinellas	FL	27.87°N 82.74°W	23:02–23:10	2.07 mi (3.33 km)	100 yd (91 m)
EF1	A tornado damaged a shopping center and heavily damaged several mobile homes and manufactured home.						
EF1	SSE of Barre Mills to NNW of St. Joseph	La Crosse	WI	43.8°N 91.13°W	23:41–23:53	5.11 mi (8.22 km)	130 yd (120 m)
EF1	Extensive tree damage occurred.						
EF0	S of Barre Mills	La Crosse	WI	43.8°N 91.12°W	23:54–23:57	1.07 mi (1.72 km)	50 yd (46 m)
EF0	Some trees were damaged in a neighborhood.						
EF0	E of Eitzen, MN to W of New Albin, IA	Allamakee (IA), Houston (MN)	IA, MN	43.5°N 91.4°W	00:14–00:19	3.63 mi (5.84 km)	50 yd (46 m)
EF0	This tornado traveled along the Iowa/Minnesota state line, damaging several trees.						
EF0	NNW of St. Mary's	Monroe	WI	43.85°N 90.71°W	00:26–00:27	0.63 mi (1.01 km)	30 yd (27 m)
EF0	A few trees were damaged and scour marks were noted in a field.						

=== June 26 event ===
List of confirmed tornadoes – Thursday, June 26, 2025
EF#	Location	County / parish	State	Start coord.	Time (UTC)	Path length	Max. width
EF1	NW of Atwater	Upson	GA	32.9736°N 84.3599°W	05:10–05:16	3.53 mi (5.68 km)	200 yd (180 m)
EF1	A unique tornado developed from colliding outflow boundaries and first touched down in a field where it snapped several pine trees as it moved into a wooded area. It continued west through the forest, emerging near two homes where numerous trees were snapped and uprooted. A large grove of hardwood trees was mostly snapped, and a tornado debris signature was detected by radar. The tornado continued west, snapping and uprooting trees along its path before dissipating in a heavily wooded region with its end point estimated due to limited access for survey teams.						
EF0	NNW of Twin Lakes to Southern Albert Lea	Freeborn	MN	43.5737°N 93.4336°W	18:15–18:25	5.16 mi (8.30 km)	75 yd (69 m)
EF0	This tornado began and moved northeast, causing crop damage in fields and tree groves. As it entered the south side of Albert Lea, it uprooted or broke multiple trees, some falling onto houses and vehicles. A backyard shed was heavily damaged, a chicken coop was tossed, and an unanchored trailer was flipped before the tornado dissipated in a business area.						
EF0	SSE of Lu Verne	Humboldt	IA	42.8796°N 94.0699°W	20:53–20:57	2.06 mi (3.32 km)	20 yd (18 m)
EF0	An outbuilding and some trees were damaged at a homestead.						
EF0	NNW of Bloomingdale to SSW of Cashton	Vernon	WI	43.69°N 90.8°W	22:41–22:43	0.65 mi (1.05 km)	75 yd (69 m)
EF0	A few trees were damaged along the West Fork Kickapoo River in Jersey Valley County Park.						

=== June 27 event ===
List of confirmed tornadoes – Friday, June 27, 2025
EF#	Location	County / parish	State	Start coord.	Time (UTC)	Path length	Max. width
EFU	SW of Hannover	Oliver	ND	47.0422°N 101.4936°W	00:45–00:53	3.35 mi (5.39 km)	100 yd (91 m)
EFU	Numerous photos and videos showed a tornado remaining over open fields.						
EFU	W of Harmon	Morton	ND	46.96°N 101.05°W	01:36–01:38	0.33 mi (0.53 km)	50 yd (46 m)
EFU	A tornado occurred in an open field causing no damage.						
EF1	WSW of Temvik	Emmons	ND	46.3422°N 100.3391°W	03:12–03:13	0.21 mi (0.34 km)	150 yd (140 m)
EF1	A high-end EF1 tornado touched down in an open field and quickly moved east, knocking over a power pole before damaging a residence with roof, siding, and window damage, and slightly shifting its foundation. It destroyed a few anchored outbuildings, caused significant damage to a large quonset hut, threw a large stainless steel trailer about 250 yards (230 m), and tossed another smaller trailer 350 yards (320 m) into trees. The tornado continued northeast, snapping hardwood trees in a shelterbelt before lifting.						
EF2	W of Temvik	Emmons	ND	46.3604°N 100.3254°W	03:18–03:30	1.77 mi (2.85 km)	200 yd (180 m)
EF2	This strong tornado developed west of Temvik, throwing a large horse trailer about 150 yards (140 m) into a tree, then destroying a new metal workshop, a small garage, and a large wooden barn, all anchored into concrete slabs. The nearby residence sustained EF1 damage with significant roof loss and its porch blown off, while widespread tree damage occurred around the property. The tornado continued north, snapping more hardwood trees before crossing a road, breaking large branches from two additional trees, and finally dissipated over an open field about a mile further north-northwest.						
EF1	N of Bismarck	Burleigh	ND	46.928°N 100.7913°W	03:23–03:26	0.32 mi (0.51 km)	150 yd (140 m)
EF1	A tornado developed north of a residence and moved south across the property causing significant roof damage to an outbuilding, toppling a covered trailer, and snapping or uprooting a few trees. It then crossed a roadway, snapping several branches off a large cottonwood tree before continuing a short distance into an open field and dissipating.						
EFU	N of Bismarck	Burleigh	ND	46.9154°N 100.7906°W	03:29–03:34	0.46 mi (0.74 km)	100 yd (91 m)
EFU	This widely observed tornado caused no damage as it remained over open country.						
EFU	N of Apple Valley to NW of Menoken	Burleigh	ND	46.8473°N 100.615°W	03:39–03:45	2.8 mi (4.5 km)	100 yd (91 m)
EFU	A tornado path was noted on high-resolution satellite imagery that tracked through fields and was captured on NDAWN (North Dakota Agricultural Weather Network) cameras.						
EFU	SE of Driscoll	Kidder	ND	46.733°N 100.0167°W	03:57–04:14	1.31 mi (2.11 km)	100 yd (91 m)
EFU	A waterspout occurred over Long Lake.						
EFU	SW of McKenzie	Burleigh	ND	46.7623°N 100.4613°W	04:12–04:14	1 mi (1.6 km)	50 yd (46 m)
EFU	This tornado tracked southeast through an open field.						

=== June 28 event ===
List of confirmed tornadoes – Saturday, June 28, 2025
EF#	Location	County / parish	State	Start coord.	Time (UTC)	Path length	Max. width
EFU	ESE of Bordulac (1st tornado)	Foster	ND	47.3756°N 98.9439°W	18:42–18:45	0.65 mi (1.05 km)	50 yd (46 m)
EFU	The first of two simultaneous tornadoes that remained over an open field.						
EFU	ESE of Bordulac (2nd tornado)	Foster	ND	47.3721°N 98.9393°W	18:43–18:46	0.54 mi (0.87 km)	50 yd (46 m)
EFU	The second of two simultaneous tornadoes that remained over an open field.						
EF2	NW of Clear Lake to SW of Altamont	Deuel	SD	44.7956°N 96.7694°W	23:53–00:08	3.43 mi (5.52 km)	60 yd (55 m)
EF2	This strong tornado touched down northwest of Clear Lake in a pasture, tearing through a shelterbelt by snapping and uprooting numerous trees before reaching an unoccupied farmstead. It flipped a storage shipping container, destroyed a shed, toppled a concrete silo, and shifted the house off its foundation. The tornado continued northeast, causing additional tree damage, twisting road signs near Lake Coteau, and was observed by eyewitnesses before dissipating.						
EF1	NNE of Haydenville	Lac qui Parle	MN	45.0383°N 96.2945°W	00:24–00:28	1.23 mi (1.98 km)	50 yd (46 m)
EF1	A few trees were knocked down along with some small branches as this tornado remained mostly over wheat fields.						
EF0	W of Gary	Deuel	SD	44.789°N 96.5037°W	00:34–00:37	0.16 mi (0.26 km)	10 yd (9.1 m)
EF0	A brief tornado touched down in an open field and snapped a few branches off of nearby trees.						
EF1	E of Holloway to S of Danvers	Swift	MN	45.2558°N 95.8544°W	00:42–00:58	4.5 mi (7.2 km)	100 yd (91 m)
EF1	This tornado struck a farmstead, damaging outbuildings, heavily damaging three turkey barns, mangling trees and knocking over three irrigation pivots.						
EF2	S of Kadoka	Jackson	SD	43.77°N 101.55°W	00:45–01:00	1.6 mi (2.6 km)	630 yd (580 m)
EF2	This strong, high-end EF2 tornado touched down west of the SD 73 White River Bridge and moved southeast through a river valley. The first home impacted lost much of its roof and part of its exterior walls and mature cottonwood trees were snapped nearby. As it continued, several outbuildings were destroyed at a second home, with more cottonwoods snapped and partially debarked. A third home, a new manufactured residence, was completely destroyed despite being strapped down, injuring two occupants as it rolled multiple times and its frame wrapped around a tree. Debris was scattered toward the White River. The tornado continued snapping and debarking mature cottonwoods before lifting.						
EF3	E of Clear Lake to SW of Gary	Deuel	SD	44.7535°N 96.6318°W	01:10–01:49	9.71 mi (15.63 km)	100 yd (91 m)
EF3	This intense tornado developed east of Clear Lake, initially flipping irrigation pivots before intensifying and tracking east. It snapped large trees, damaged heavy machinery, collapsed a shed roof, and downed a power pole. As it continued east, it ripped roof panels and broke windows on a house, destroyed a machine shed, garage, and outbuilding, and heavily damaged a shelterbelt. At a third farmstead, it completely destroyed a house, lofted hay bales into the basement where residents sheltered, swept away multiple outbuildings, lofted vehicles into trees, hurled a pickup truck nearly 300 yards (270 m) tearing off its axle, and obliterated grain bins and a silo. The tornado also sheared fence posts, embedded debris into fields, snapped trees, and lofted hay onto power lines before roping out and lifting. Two injuries occurred.						
EFU	SE of Gary, SD	Yellow Medicine	MN	44.7698°N 96.4159°W	01:49–01:51	0.28 mi (0.45 km)	25 yd (23 m)
EFU	A brief tornado moved across a field and was observed by storm chasers.						

=== June 29 event ===
List of confirmed tornadoes – Sunday, June 29, 2025
EF#	Location	County / parish	State	Start coord.	Time (UTC)	Path length	Max. width
EF0	NE of Assumption to WNW of East Union	Carver	MN	44.7159°N 93.8474°W	05:10–05:28	5.68 mi (9.14 km)	50 yd (46 m)
EF0	A shed and an old barn collapsed. Dozens of trees were broken.						
EF0	NW of Cologne to S of Waconia	Carver	MN	44.8046°N 93.8349°W	05:11–05:15	2.07 mi (3.33 km)	25 yd (23 m)
EF0	A few large tree branches were snapped.						
EF0	NW of Cologne to SE of Waconia	Carver	MN	44.7934°N 93.8099°W	05:12–05:18	3.37 mi (5.42 km)	50 yd (46 m)
EF0	This tornado snapped or uprooted dozens of trees. It hit one farm, damaging several outbuildings. Roof panels were removed and the door was blown off a large shed. An old barn also collapsed.						
EF1	ENE of Mayer to SE of St. Bonifacius	Carver	MN	44.8974°N 93.8599°W	05:14–05:24	7.18 mi (11.56 km)	300 yd (270 m)
EF1	Several trees were uprooted and branches were snapped on either side of Lake Waconia.						
EF1	S of Minnetrista to Northern Victoria	Carver	MN	44.888°N 93.694°W	05:23–05:31	4.38 mi (7.05 km)	250 yd (230 m)
EF1	Numerous trees were damaged or uprooted.						

=== June 30 event ===
List of confirmed tornadoes – Monday, June 30, 2025
EF#	Location	County / parish	State	Start coord.	Time (UTC)	Path length	Max. width
EF0	E of Frankford	Sussex	DE	38.5266°N 75.2111°W	17:16	0.5 mi (0.80 km)	100 yd (91 m)
EF0	Several large branches were twisted and snapped.						

== July ==
Confirmed tornadoes by Enhanced Fujita rating
EFU	EF0	EF1	EF2	EF3	EF4	EF5	Total
26	38	23	7	0	0	0	94

=== July 1 event ===
List of confirmed tornadoes – Tuesday, July 1, 2025
EF#	Location	County / parish	State	Start coord.	Time (UTC)	Path length	Max. width
EF0	N of Weavertown to W of Earlville	Berks	PA	40.31°N 75.75°W	20:47–20:49	0.9 mi (1.4 km)	150 yd (140 m)
EF0	Several trees were downed and large tree branches were snapped.						
EF0	W of Farson	Sweetwater	WY	42.1024°N 109.5071°W	21:05–21:08	0.79 mi (1.27 km)	25 yd (23 m)
EF0	A landspout was photographed over open country, causing no damage.						
EF1	SE of Compton to SSW of Leonardtown	St. Mary's	MD	38.259°N 76.672°W	23:45–23:47	0.98 mi (1.58 km)	100 yd (91 m)
EF1	This tornado began by uprooting two pine trees near a community dock and moved northeast, damaging or snapping numerous trees, including a large sycamore. Minor roof damage occurred to at least one home. As the tornado tracked along the shoreline of the Potomac River, it briefly became a waterspout over Breton Bay, flipping multiple boats off raised docks, causing property damage near Paw Paw Point, and snapping a large tree before lifting.						
EF0	S of Leonardtown	St. Mary's	MD	38.255°N 76.628°W	23:45–23:46	0.1 mi (0.16 km)	75 yd (69 m)
EF0	A tornado briefly touched down, uprooting around ten trees and snapping the tops off ten others with damage oriented in various directions. Two trees fell onto homes and one tree fell on a vehicle.						

=== July 3 event ===
List of confirmed tornadoes – Thursday, July 3, 2025
EF#	Location	County / parish	State	Start coord.	Time (UTC)	Path length	Max. width
EFU	W of Boyle	Bolivar	MS	33.7°N 90.73°W	00:15	0.01 mi (0.016 km)	20 yd (18 m)
EFU	A brief landspout was recorded. No damage occurred.						

=== July 4 event ===
List of confirmed tornadoes – Friday, July 4, 2025
EF#	Location	County / parish	State	Start coord.	Time (UTC)	Path length	Max. width
EF0	SE of Faunce	Lake of the Woods	MN	48.4942°N 94.807°W	17:44–17:56	4.21 mi (6.78 km)	200 yd (180 m)
EF0	High-resolution satellite imagery showed a weak tornadic scar in the southeastern edge of the Beltrami Island State Forest.						

=== July 6 event ===
North Carolina events associated with Tropical Storm Chantal.

List of confirmed tornadoes – Sunday, July 6, 2025
EF#	Location	County / parish	State	Start coord.	Time (UTC)	Path length	Max. width
EF0	Western Kings Grant	New Hanover	NC	34.2667°N 77.8811°W	08:27–08:31	1.68 mi (2.70 km)	30 yd (27 m)
EF0	This weak tornado caused mostly large limbs to fall along its path with a couple of trees snapped or uprooted and minor shingle damage to some homes. It crossed near a truck rental business, moved across northeast portions of Wilmington International Airport causing additional tree damage, and then lifted in a wooded area.						
EF1	N of Sanford	Lee	NC	35.58°N 79.1°W	19:00–19:04	1 mi (1.6 km)	150 yd (140 m)
EF1	This tornado touched down at the Raleigh Executive Jetport, damaging wall panels and doors on several hangars. Multiple aircraft were also damaged along with minor damage to the taxiway. The tornado intermittently lifted before touching back down, causing minor damage to mobile homes and uprooting and/or snapping multiple trees.						
EF1	SSE of Pittsboro	Chatham	NC	35.66°N 79.13°W	19:24–19:29	1.4 mi (2.3 km)	100 yd (91 m)
EF1	Several trees were uprooted or snapped.						
EF1	S of Bellemont	Alamance	NC	35.96°N 79.44°W	21:32–21:34	0.6 mi (0.97 km)	175 yd (160 m)
EF1	Numerous trees were snapped or uprooted and an auto repair shop had its roof torn off.						
EFU	E of Brush	Morgan	CO	40.2446°N 103.4996°W	21:48–21:53	1.08 mi (1.74 km)	50 yd (46 m)
EFU	A landspout remained over open fields.						
EF0	SSW of Bayle City	Fayette	IL	39.0859°N 89.1811°W	22:05–22:06	0.12 mi (0.19 km)	50 yd (46 m)
EF0	A brief tornado damaged a few farm outbuildings and crops.						
EF1	NE of Mebane	Orange	NC	36.12°N 79.24°W	22:10–22:13	0.25 mi (0.40 km)	250 yd (230 m)
EF1	Dozens of trees were snapped or uprooted.						
EFU	NNE of Potter	Cheyenne	NE	41.3671°N 103.2389°W	00:12	0.1 mi (0.16 km)	50 yd (46 m)
EFU	A brief landspout was recorded by multiple people.						

=== July 7 event ===
List of confirmed tornadoes – Monday, July 7, 2025
EF#	Location	County / parish	State	Start coord.	Time (UTC)	Path length	Max. width
EF0	ENE of Chatham	Medina	OH	41.1129°N 81.9834°W	19:57–19:59	1.32 mi (2.12 km)	40 yd (37 m)
EF0	This tornado primarily caused tree damage along its path, snapping multiple trees. It damaged an unoccupied small barn and caused minor roof damage to a home while also snapping several large tree branches before dissipating.						
EF0	SW of Calio	Towner, Cavalier	ND	48.6101°N 98.9801°W	20:40–20:50	1.54 mi (2.48 km)	100 yd (91 m)
EF0	A dusty tornado was observed.						
EF0	NNE of Edmore	Ramsey	ND	48.4482°N 98.4378°W	21:27–21:28	0.53 mi (0.85 km)	10 yd (9.1 m)
EF0	Local law enforcement reported a tornado. No damage was reported.						
EF0	NE of Lawton	Walsh	ND	48.375°N 98.2953°W	22:08–22:10	0.6 mi (0.97 km)	30 yd (27 m)
EF0	A spotter reported a brief tornado with no damage occurring.						
EF2	S of Phelps	Ontario	NY	42.9241°N 77.0703°W	22:27–22:37	1.7 mi (2.7 km)	300 yd (270 m)
EF2	A strong tornado began by breaking hardwood tree branches before quickly intensifying, snapping and uprooting multiple softwood trees near two homes and a barn, though the structures themselves were not noticeably damaged. As it moved east-southeast, dozens of hardwood trees were snapped near a large farm area. Further along, three residences were damaged: one home lost its entire roof and part of its walls, another with its roof fully destroyed, a barn shifted off its foundation, and a silo that lost about half its roof.						
EF0	NNE of Whitman	Walsh	ND	48.2611°N 98.0881°W	22:31–22:33	0.98 mi (1.58 km)	10 yd (9.1 m)
EF0	A weak ground circulation was reported persisting for only two minutes. No damage was reported.						
EF1	ENE of Reynolds	Grand Forks	ND	47.687°N 97.0041°W	00:56–00:58	0.58 mi (0.93 km)	30 yd (27 m)
EF1	Multiple large trees were snapped or split and a grain bin was ripped from its anchoring and blown 0.25 miles (0.40 km) into a farm field.						
EF0	N of Nielsville	Polk	MN	47.56°N 96.82°W	01:29–01:30	0.62 mi (1.00 km)	10 yd (9.1 m)
EF0	A few leaves were ripped off of crops.						
EF1	WSW of Beltrami to NW of Lockhart	Polk, Norman	MN	47.5066°N 96.6302°W	01:53–02:22	4.72 mi (7.60 km)	40 yd (37 m)
EF1	A tornado damaged some farm outbuildings and scoured a soybean field and cornfield.						

=== July 8 event ===
List of confirmed tornadoes – Tuesday, July 8, 2025
EF#	Location	County / parish	State	Start coord.	Time (UTC)	Path length	Max. width
EFU	NNE of Crosbyton	Crosby	TX	33.804°N 101.167°W	21:25–21:45		
EFU	A long-lasting landspout was observed as it remained over open country.						

=== July 10 event ===
List of confirmed tornadoes – Thursday, July 10, 2025
EF#	Location	County / parish	State	Start coord.	Time (UTC)	Path length	Max. width
EF0	E of Port Wentworth, GA	Jasper	SC	32.1647°N 81.0879°W	21:14–21:16	0.63 mi (1.01 km)	60 yd (55 m)
EF0	A weak tornado occurred within the Savannah National Wildlife Refuge, snapping small tree limbs and the tops of some trees.						
EFU	NE of Canton	Jackson	IA	42.2°N 90.84°W	23:44–23:45	0.1 mi (0.16 km)	10 yd (9.1 m)
EFU	A brief tornado was documented by a storm chaser.						

=== July 11 event ===
List of confirmed tornadoes – Friday, July 11, 2025
EF#	Location	County / parish	State	Start coord.	Time (UTC)	Path length	Max. width
EF1	N of Keystone to W of Van Horne	Benton	IA	42.03°N 92.2°W	20:17–20:21	3.8 mi (6.1 km)	20 yd (18 m)
EF1	A tornado struck and damaged a farm outbuilding and a house. Some trees were snapped and a garage was destroyed as well.						
EF1	SSE of Urbana to Southern Center Point	Benton, Linn	IA	42.158°N 91.849°W	20:35–20:39	4.13 mi (6.65 km)	250 yd (230 m)
EF1	This tornado moved through rural areas near the Cedar River causing widespread tree damage, including numerous uprooted and snapped trees. A few homes and garages sustained roof damage before the tornado dissipated at the southern edge of Center Point.						
EFU	NW of Hawleyville	Page	IA	40.79°N 94.97°W	20:46	0.01 mi (0.016 km)	1 yd (0.91 m)
EFU	A brief tornado was recorded in a field.						
EF2	Alice to NE of Alburnett	Linn	IA	42.21°N 91.71°W	20:46–20:53	6.74 mi (10.85 km)	300 yd (270 m)
EF2	A strong tornado quickly developed and rapidly intensified as it passed through Alice, causing significant damage at a homestead where a dozen large trees were downed or thrown, and the house, garage, and outbuildings suffered roof damage. As it continued, additional farmsteads experienced outbuilding destruction, snapped trees, and utility poles knocked down or thrown.						
EF1	N of Waubeek to Langworthy	Linn, Jones	IA	42.19°N 91.46°W	21:04–21:16	12.45 mi (20.04 km)	150 yd (140 m)
EF1	This tornado formed just east of the Wapsipinicon River, snapping a few tree branches and trees. The tornado then entered Jones County where it snapped several large trees and a mobile home sustained roof damage before dissipating near US 151.						
EF0	SW of Hopkinton	Delaware	IA	42.32°N 91.3°W	21:17–21:19	1.68 mi (2.70 km)	40 yd (37 m)
EF0	A high-end EF0 tornado destroyed the wall of a farm outbuilding and caused some damage to trees.						
EF1	NNE of Scotch Grove to Temple Hill	Jones	IA	42.18°N 91.1°W	21:20–21:30	10.1 mi (16.3 km)	150 yd (140 m)
EF1	This tornado tracked through mainly wooded areas inflicting significant tree damage along the Maquoketa River and within Eby's Mill Wildlife Area.						
EF1	N of Cascade to W of Fillmore	Dubuque	IA	42.34°N 91°W	21:32–21:35	3.4 mi (5.5 km)	50 yd (46 m)
EF1	A tornado carved a path through cornfields before striking a homestead where it destroyed a loop building, removed the roof of an outbuilding and destroyed a garage.						
EF1	Bernard	Dubuque	IA	42.31°N 90.83°W	21:45–21:46	0.86 mi (1.38 km)	25 yd (23 m)
EF1	A Dubuque County road maintenance shed and trees were damaged in Bernard.						
EF2	NNE of La Motte	Jackson	IA	42.3°N 90.62°W	21:54–21:57	2.9 mi (4.7 km)	250 yd (230 m)
EF2	This strong, multiple-vortex tornado began north of La Motte, initially damaging the roof of an agricultural building. As it moved east, it caused tree damage. The tornado then reached its peak intensity where a large farm building was severely damaged with its entire roof and half of its walls being torn off and sheet metal and insulation scattered in multiple directions. A metal power pole was bent, and several wooden utility poles were snapped. Farther east, the tornado destroyed two additional farm buildings, caused extensive tree damage, and tore the roof off a house before dissipating.						
EF2	ESE of Blue Grass to Western Davenport	Scott	IA	41.49°N 90.73°W	22:03–22:13	7.6 mi (12.2 km)	500 yd (460 m)
EF2	A significant tornado rapidly formed and moved northeast, causing extensive damage around the I-280 area. The tornado impacted a Camping World where over fifteen RVs were blown over, including a 25,000 lb (11,000 kg) unit. The tornado then entered western Davenport where a residential area and golf course sustained damage. Approximately eighty moderate to large trees were snapped or uprooted, some in dense clusters. At least two unoccupied vehicles were struck by falling trees before the tornado dissipated just north of US 6.						
EF0	Northeastern Bettendorf to Western Le Claire	Scott	IA	41.6°N 90.45°W	22:33–22:36	3.9 mi (6.3 km)	75 yd (69 m)
EF0	This high-end EF0 tornado peeled a large section of sheet metal roofing off an outbuilding and tossed it over 100 yards (91 m) into a nearby cornfield. A billboard, trees and crops suffered minor damage as well.						
EFU	SW of Fleming	Logan	CO	40.55°N 102.99°W	23:01–23:04	0.36 mi (0.58 km)	20 yd (18 m)
EFU	A tornado occurred over an open field.						
EF0	Strasburg	Cass	MO	38.7608°N 94.1771°W	01:21–01:23	0.88 mi (1.42 km)	200 yd (180 m)
EF0	A weak tornado caused minor tree damage near Route 58 before moving into Strasburg. As it passed through the city, it snapped small and medium tree limbs with more noticeable damage to the tops of trees on the northeast side of town. Around a dozen trees were snapped just south of a cornfield east of Strasburg. The tornado then moved northeast, with its final damage consisting of small limbs downed along a nearby road.						

=== July 12 event ===
List of confirmed tornadoes – Saturday, July 12, 2025
EF#	Location	County / parish	State	Start coord.	Time (UTC)	Path length	Max. width
EF0	N of Waukomis	Garfield	OK	36.332°N 97.873°W	18:13	0.2 mi (0.32 km)	20 yd (18 m)
EF0	A weak tornado was observed. No damage was noted.						
EF2	NE of La Sal	San Juan	UT	38.3792°N 109.1435°W	19:03–19:15	0.1 mi (0.16 km)	100 yd (91 m)
EF2	A nearly stationary, rare firenado was spawned by the Deer Creek Fire. The roof of a home and several outbuildings sustained extensive wind and fire damage; many of the affected structures were later burned by the aforementioned fire.						
EF0	Edmond	Oklahoma	OK	35.65°N 97.468°W	19:30	0.1 mi (0.16 km)	10 yd (9.1 m)
EF0	This weak tornado occurred in Edmond but caused no damage.						

=== July 13 event ===
List of confirmed tornadoes – Sunday, July 13, 2025
EF#	Location	County / parish	State	Start coord.	Time (UTC)	Path length	Max. width
EF0	SE of Aberdeen	Brown	SD	45.4073°N 98.3713°W	20:49	0.1 mi (0.16 km)	10 yd (9.1 m)
EF0	This landspout tornado blew apart a swing set and launched a trampoline into a nearby cornfield. Spotty damage to the corn crop was also noted.						

=== July 14 event ===
List of confirmed tornadoes – Monday, July 14, 2025
EF#	Location	County / parish	State	Start coord.	Time (UTC)	Path length	Max. width
EF1	Franktown	Douglas	CO	39.3912°N 104.7521°W	20:33	0.26 mi (0.42 km)	50 yd (46 m)
EF1	This brief landspout tore the roof off of a building.						
EFU	SE of Hudson	Weld	CO	40.04°N 104.61°W	22:53–22:56	0.23 mi (0.37 km)	10 yd (9.1 m)
EFU	This landspout remained over open fields.						

=== July 15 event ===
List of confirmed tornadoes – Tuesday, July 15, 2025
EF#	Location	County / parish	State	Start coord.	Time (UTC)	Path length	Max. width
EF0	NNW of Mullen	Cherry	NE	42.143°N 101.087°W	21:18–21:22	0.77 mi (1.24 km)	25 yd (23 m)
EF0	A home suffered minor damage to its siding and a glass door. Wire fencing and a shelter belt also sustained some damage.						
EF0	N of Chamberlain	Lyman	SD	43.864°N 99.319°W	21:37	0.01 mi (0.016 km)	1 yd (0.91 m)
EF0	A waterspout occurred over the Missouri River.						
EF0	SSW of Indian Wells	Navajo	AZ	35.29°N 110.16°W	00:00–00:05	0.1 mi (0.16 km)	50 yd (46 m)
EF0	A landspout was recorded in open desert.						

=== July 16 event ===
List of confirmed tornadoes – Wednesday, July 16, 2025
EF#	Location	County / parish	State	Start coord.	Time (UTC)	Path length	Max. width
EFU	S of Seymour	Jackson	IN	38.9028°N 85.8974°W	14:31–14:32	0.17 mi (0.27 km)	10 yd (9.1 m)
EFU	A brief tornado occurred in an open field.						
EF1	NE of Dodgeville to SW of Hyde	Iowa	WI	42.9819°N 90.1048°W	17:20–17:33	6.84 mi (11.01 km)	150 yd (140 m)
EF1	This tornado developed near a Blain's Farm & Fleet in Dodgeville and moved northeast through a cornfield. It continued on this path, causing damage to numerous trees and one outbuilding. The most significant damage occurred where many large, healthy hardwood trees were uprooted. The tornado then weakened and dissipated after.						
EF0	NE of Mazomanie to E of Sauk City	Dane	WI	43.2051°N 89.7537°W	18:15–18:25	5.59 mi (9.00 km)	100 yd (91 m)
EF0	This tornado began near WIS 78 and moved through hilly terrain. The most notable damage occurred in a neighborhood where approximately twenty to forty trees were uprooted or lost large limbs. One house in the area sustained minor roof damage with a few shingles pulled up. Most structural damage was caused by falling trees. The tornado then crossed US 12 and lifted.						
EF0	SE of Mauston	Juneau	WI	43.775°N 90.018°W	18:27–18:28	0.24 mi (0.39 km)	15 yd (14 m)
EF0	This brief and weak tornado was recorded crossing I-90 damaging some small tree branches and corn.						
EF0	NNE of Beaver Dam	Dodge	WI	43.5264°N 88.8104°W	19:59–20:00	0.09 mi (0.14 km)	30 yd (27 m)
EF0	A tree had a few of its branches downed.						
EF0	Western Hustisford	Dodge	WI	43.3145°N 88.6358°W	20:22–20:33	3.04 mi (4.89 km)	50 yd (46 m)
EF0	This tornado developed south of Hustisford and tracked north-northeast through primarily farmland, producing a convergent damage path through a cornfield. It caused some tree damage south of WIS 60 before continuing north. Minor additional impacts occurred near a residential area before the tornado appeared to dissipate over Sinissippi Lake.						

=== July 18 event ===
List of confirmed tornadoes – Saturday, July 19, 2025
EF#	Location	County / parish	State	Start coord.	Time (UTC)	Path length	Max. width
EFU	S of Johnstown (1st tornado)	Brown	NE	42.48°N 100.06°W	01:24	0.01 mi (0.016 km)	10 yd (9.1 m)
EFU	A tornado briefly touched down over open terrain.						
EFU	S of Johnstown (2nd tornado)	Brown	NE	42.45°N 100.08°W	01:38	0.01 mi (0.016 km)	10 yd (9.1 m)
EFU	This tornado quickly formed and dissipated in a field, causing no damage.						
EFU	NE of Purdum	Brown	NE	42.28°N 100.05°W	02:20	0.01 mi (0.016 km)	10 yd (9.1 m)
EFU	A brief tornado caused no damage.						

=== July 19 event ===
List of confirmed tornadoes – Saturday, July 19, 2025
EF#	Location	County / parish	State	Start coord.	Time (UTC)	Path length	Max. width
EFU	SE of Mackey to W of Gilbert	Boone, Story	IA	42.1488°N 93.7313°W	10:45–10:49	4.45 mi (7.16 km)	40 yd (37 m)
EFU	A tornado tracked entirely through cornfields, damaging crops.						
EF0	N of Branch	Manitowoc	WI	44.179°N 87.7566°W	21:21–21:25	1.58 mi (2.54 km)	60 yd (55 m)
EF0	The siding and roofing of a home was damaged and a few trees were uprooted with large branches snapped.						
EF1	NE of Rozet	Crook	WY	44.38°N 105.08°W	22:00–22:05	0.01 mi (0.016 km)	55 yd (50 m)
EF1	This landspout struck a rural property in far western Crook County, initially causing damage to several outbuildings, including the destruction of a small shed and displacement of a storage silo. As it tracked northeast, it snapped several trees near a home and removed some roofing material. The landspout then strengthened, destroying a large outbuilding by shifting it off its foundation, collapsing its walls, and displacing concrete braces. It continued into open fields, leaving a large debris field of tree limbs and building materials scattered to the east, northeast, and north of the track.						
EF0	ENE of Anna	Shelby	OH	40.4053°N 84.13°W	01:14–01:18	1.08 mi (1.74 km)	50 yd (46 m)
EF0	Minor tree damage and concentrated crop damage occurred.						
EF0	SE of North Hampton to WSW of Lawrenceville	Clark	OH	39.9749°N 83.922°W	01:15–01:19	0.9 mi (1.4 km)	50 yd (46 m)
EF0	A few small trees were snapped, several tree branches were downed and significant damage occurred to corn.						
EF1	Northridge to NW of New Moorefield	Clark	OH	39.9936°N 83.7825°W	01:35–01:44	2.8 mi (4.5 km)	175 yd (160 m)
EF1	This tornado caused sporadic tree and minor structural damage at the beginning of its path, including a tree falling onto a camper. More significant damage occurred in a residential neighborhood where two homes lost large portions of their roofs, with one roof section thrown across the road. Numerous trees were uprooted or snapped, and debris was scattered and lodged in trees. Many homes experienced shingle damage. Toward the end of the path, damage became more scattered, with several downed trees and large limbs noted.						

=== July 20 event ===
List of confirmed tornadoes – Sunday, July 20, 2025
EF#	Location	County / parish	State	Start coord.	Time (UTC)	Path length	Max. width
EFU	WSW of Patriot	Switzerland	IN	38.8354°N 84.8754°W	20:31–20:35	0.69 mi (1.11 km)	50 yd (46 m)
EFU	A brief tornado was recorded by several people.						
EFU	NW of Parmelee	Todd	SD	43.34°N 101.05°W	23:33–23:34	0.08 mi (0.13 km)	20 yd (18 m)
EFU	This tornado remained over farmland.						
EFU	NW of Valentine	Cherry	NE	42.93°N 100.62°W	01:15	0.01 mi (0.016 km)	10 yd (9.1 m)
EFU	A brief tornado touched down. No damage was reported.						

=== July 21 event ===
List of confirmed tornadoes – Monday, July 21, 2025
EF#	Location	County / parish	State	Start coord.	Time (UTC)	Path length	Max. width
EF0	S of Nocatee	DeSoto	FL	27.1331°N 81.8855°W	02:44–02:46	0.24 mi (0.39 km)	25 yd (23 m)
EF0	A landspout caused minor damage to a couple of homes and some power lines were downed.						

=== July 22 event ===
List of confirmed tornadoes – Tuesday, July 22, 2025
EF#	Location	County / parish	State	Start coord.	Time (UTC)	Path length	Max. width
EFU	N of Barnegat Light	Ocean	NJ	39.8°N 74.09°W	14:38		
EFU	A waterspout came ashore from the Atlantic Ocean and quickly dissipated.						

=== July 23 event ===
List of confirmed tornadoes – Wednesday, July 23, 2025
EF#	Location	County / parish	State	Start coord.	Time (UTC)	Path length	Max. width
EFU	NE of Sargent	Custer	NE	41.7°N 99.29°W	21:11	0.01 mi (0.016 km)	10 yd (9.1 m)
EFU	A brief tornado touched down. No damage was reported.						
EF0	SSE of Norske to W of Big Falls	Waupaca	WI	44.6218°N 89.1831°W	22:04–22:13	5.69 mi (9.16 km)	45 yd (41 m)
EF0	A few trees were snapped and uprooted and a house sustained minor damage.						
EFU	NE of Westerville	Custer	NE	41.44°N 99.34°W	22:15	0.01 mi (0.016 km)	10 yd (9.1 m)
EFU	An emergency manager reported a brief tornado touched down and inflicted no damage.						
EF1	Northern Keshena to Legend Lake	Menominee	WI	44.8849°N 88.6608°W	22:15–22:25	7.43 mi (11.96 km)	90 yd (82 m)
EF1	Several trees were snapped or uprooted.						
EFU	SW of Clintonville	Waupaca	WI	44.594°N 88.79°W	22:32–22:34	1.32 mi (2.12 km)	80 yd (73 m)
EFU	A brief tornado was observed by a local fire department. Crop damage was noted on high-resolution satellite imagery.						
EF1	Northern Gillett	Oconto	WI	44.8964°N 88.3092°W	22:37–22:40	2.33 mi (3.75 km)	65 yd (59 m)
EF1	This tornado tore the roof off of one metal building and damaged the roof of another nearby structure. Multiple trees were uprooted or snapped as well.						
EF0	NW of Oconto	Oconto	WI	44.9063°N 87.9276°W	23:00–23:04	2.37 mi (3.81 km)	65 yd (59 m)
EF0	A tornado snapped or uprooted many trees at and around a golf course.						

=== July 26 event ===
List of confirmed tornadoes – Saturday, July 26, 2025
EF#	Location	County / parish	State	Start coord.	Time (UTC)	Path length	Max. width
EF1	NE of Deckerville	Sanilac	MI	43.5691°N 82.6846°W	20:18–20:21	1.67 mi (2.69 km)	100 yd (91 m)
EF1	A tornado touched down in a rural area, snapping large tree limbs and tearing the top off a pine tree, which impaled a semi-truck. Several vehicles were shifted, windows were blown out, and a camper was flipped. A large farm building lost parts of its back wall and roof panels, which were carried about 1,000 yards (910 m) into a nearby field. Crops of corn and sugar beets were damaged with a distinct convergent path visible in fields. Further east, the tornado destroyed a large machine shed and a smaller shed, scattering debris into an adjacent field before causing minor tree damage and dissipating.						

=== July 27 event ===
List of confirmed tornadoes – Sunday, July 27, 2025
EF#	Location	County / parish	State	Start coord.	Time (UTC)	Path length	Max. width
EF2	NE of Henry to W of Kampeska	Codington	SD	44.9438°N 97.3777°W	22:55–23:16	3.98 mi (6.41 km)	200 yd (180 m)
EF2	This strong, high-end EF2 tornado first touched down in an open field before moving south toward a farmstead. The main residence was destroyed, with the roof and most exterior walls gone while interior walls remained. An attached garage was swept from its foundation and one outbuilding was destroyed while others were heavily damaged. Nine grain bins were completely removed and a horse was killed. The tornado continued south through cropland, snapping and stripping shelterbelt trees before crossing a lake and additional farmland. It weakened and dissipated just north of another lake.						
EFU	NW of Elsmere	Cherry	NE	42.51°N 100.67°W	22:55–23:16	0.01 mi (0.016 km)	10 yd (9.1 m)
EFU	A tornado briefly occurred within the Valentine National Wildlife Refuge. No damage was noted.						

=== July 28 event ===
List of confirmed tornadoes – Monday, July 28, 2025
EF#	Location	County / parish	State	Start coord.	Time (UTC)	Path length	Max. width
EF1	NW of Dixon to NW of Lucas	Gregory	SD	43.406°N 99.494°W	21:28–21:49	11.66 mi (18.76 km)	150 yd (140 m)
EF1	This high-end EF1 tornado touched down northwest of Dixon and moved southeast. It destroyed a farm outbuilding before crossing the SD 44/SD 47 intersection where it damaged power poles and a SDDOT truck shelter. The tornado continued southeast across open country before dissipating.						
EF0	WNW of Lucas	Gregory	SD	43.297°N 99.236°W	22:04–22:09	2.71 mi (4.36 km)	50 yd (46 m)
EF0	A high-end EF0 tornado touched down northwest of Lucas. It uprooted a cluster of mature pine trees and damaged trees in a tree line near the southwestern edge of town. The tornado continued across open pasture, damaging more trees before crossing an open cornfield and dissipating.						
EF2	N of Bonesteel	Gregory	SD	43.187°N 98.984°W	22:38–23:06	7.43 mi (11.96 km)	175 yd (160 m)
EF2	This strong, high-end EF2 tornado touched down and began damaging power poles before tracking due south across open country. It destroyed a single-family home and two outbuildings along a county road. The tornado continued south, flipping a camper and destroying an abandoned trailer. The tornado lifted just before entering Bonesteel at the town's baseball fields.						
EF0	NW of Smithville	Wayne	OH	40.8943°N 81.9239°W	22:58–23:00	0.73 mi (1.17 km)	25 yd (23 m)
EF0	A weak tornado touched down near SR 3, causing minor damage to structures and trees. A tree was blown onto a mobile home and visible twisting was observed in the tops of nearby trees. As the tornado moved northeast, another tree was blown onto power lines east of SR 3 and several large limbs fell onto a carport in the same area.						
EFU	NW of Terrebonne	Jefferson	OR	44.4212°N 121.2465°W	00:00–00:01	Unknown	Unknown
EFU	A funnel cloud briefly made contact with the ground near a golf course, causing no damage. This is only the 2nd documented tornado in Jefferson County since reliable records began in 1950.						
EF0	SSE of Davis to N of Beresford	Lincoln	SD	43.224°N 96.85°W	01:59–02:02	3.29 mi (5.29 km)	30 yd (27 m)
EF0	Minor tree damage occurred at a farmstead.						
EF1	E of Alvord	Lyon	IA	43.3488°N 96.2829°W	02:29–02:31	2.06 mi (3.32 km)	250 yd (230 m)
EF1	A large barn was destroyed while farm structures and a grove of trees were damaged.						
EFU	E of Alvord	Lyon	IA	43.3458°N 96.2093°W	02:34–02:35	0.21 mi (0.34 km)	50 yd (46 m)
EFU	A brief tornado only damaged corn crops.						
EFU	S of Crystal Lake	Hancock	IA	43.1899°N 93.8371°W	04:50–04:52	1.21 mi (1.95 km)	20 yd (18 m)
EFU	This narrow tornado remained over farmland.						

=== July 29 event ===
List of confirmed tornadoes – Tuesday, July 29, 2025
EF#	Location	County / parish	State	Start coord.	Time (UTC)	Path length	Max. width
EF0	SE of Clear Lake	Cerro Gordo	IA	43.0979°N 93.3421°W	05:10–05:14	1.64 mi (2.64 km)	15 yd (14 m)
EF0	A high-end EF0 tornado uprooted some trees.						

=== July 30 event ===
List of confirmed tornadoes – Wednesday, July 30, 2025
EF#	Location	County / parish	State	Start coord.	Time (UTC)	Path length	Max. width
EF1	WNW of Woodland Park	Teller	CO	39.0221°N 105.149°W	19:55–20:01	0.8 mi (1.3 km)	50 yd (46 m)
EF1	Numerous trees were uprooted and a few were snapped.						
EF0	S of Westcliffe	Custer	CO	38.03°N 105.44°W	21:10–21:15	0.34 mi (0.55 km)	20 yd (18 m)
EF0	A few power poles were leaned.						
EFU	SW of Albuquerque	Bernalillo	NM	35.0302°N 106.7017°W	21:30–21:35	0.18 mi (0.29 km)	10 yd (9.1 m)
EFU	A landspout was observed just outside of Albuquerque, causing no damage.						

=== July 31 event ===
List of confirmed tornadoes – Thursday, July 31, 2025
EF#	Location	County / parish	State	Start coord.	Time (UTC)	Path length	Max. width
EF0	Annapolis	Anne Arundel	MD	38.975°N 76.481°W	18:46–18:47	0.13 mi (0.21 km)	25 yd (23 m)
EF0	A waterspout formed over Spa Creek between the Eastport neighborhood and the U.S. Naval Academy, coming ashore at the Severn Sailing Association marina. Several small trailered and stored boats were blown over in the parking area before the circulation moved back over the Severn River. It dissipated over the water with no additional damage reported.						
EFU	ENE of Townsend	Broadwater	MT	46.37°N 111.36°W	23:53		
EFU	A landspout with a defined ground circulation was photographed. This is only the 2nd documented tornado in Broadwater County since reliable records began in 1950.						

== See also ==
- Tornadoes of 2025
- List of United States tornadoes in May 2025
- List of United States tornadoes from August to December 2025
