= Bluit, New Mexico =

Bluit
- Town
- Location in the United States Bluit (the United States)
- Coordinates: 33°37′45″N 103°11′01″W
- Country: United States
- State: New Mexico
- County: Roosevelt

Population
  - Total: 0

Bluit is a ghost town in southern Roosevelt County, in the southeastern part of the U.S. state of New Mexico. The village is located about 12 miles east of Milnesand, New Mexico, on NM 262. There are few remains of the community now standing, as the site is long abandoned. The Bluit cemetery is located at 33°38′10″N 103°08′56″W.

There was a fatal gun battle in Bluit in 1932, between bank robbers and law officers from Texas and New Mexico. The town's one-room schoolhouse closed in 1945, with remaining students reassigned to schools in Lingo and Dora. Oil wells in Bluit continued to flow into the late 1950s.
