= Lucas, South Dakota =

Unincorporated community in South Dakota, U.S.

Coordinates: 43°17′23″N 99°12′59″W

Lucas is an unincorporated community in Gregory County, in the U.S. state of South Dakota. The community is located approximately eight miles west of Lake Francis Case between the north and south forks of Whetstone Creek. Gregory lies approximately 12 miles to the west-southwest and Burke lies about seven miles to the south-southwest.

== History ==
A post office called Lucas was established in 1905, and remained in operation until 1985. The community has the name of S. F. Lucas, a member of the town company.
