= Hawleyville, Iowa =

- Extinct Hamlet
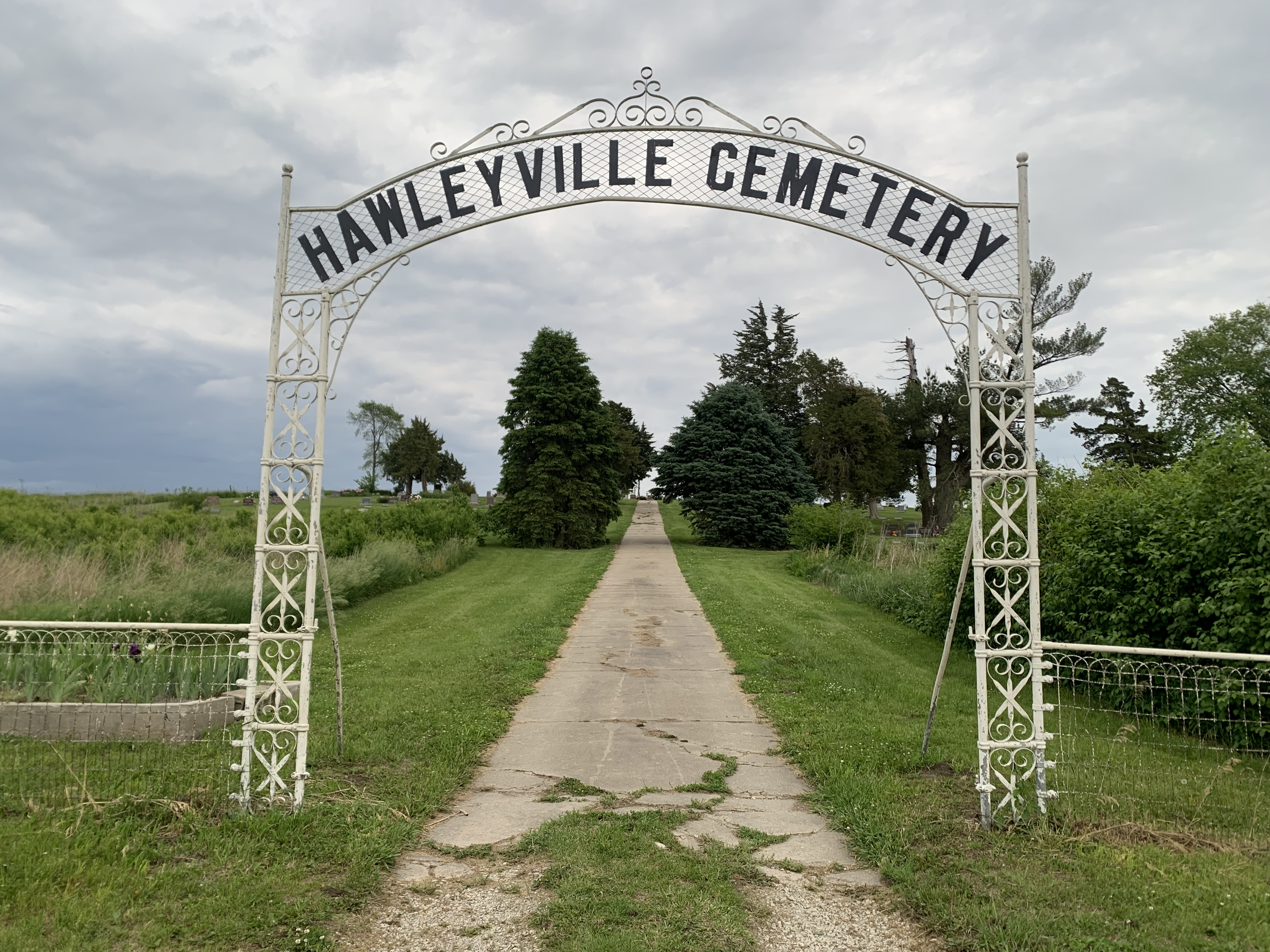
- Hawleyville Cemetery in Nebraska Township

- Location within Iowa
- Coordinates: 40°46′36″N 94°56′11″W
- Country: United States
- State: Iowa
- County: Page, Taylor
- Elevation: 1,027 ft (313 m)
- Time zone: UTC-6 (Central (CST))
  - Summer (DST): UTC-5 (CDT)
- Area code: 712
- GNIS feature ID: 457336

Hawleyville is an extinct hamlet in Page and Taylor counties in the U.S. state of Iowa. The Page County portion of the community is in Nebraska Township, while the Taylor County portion is in Dallas Township. Hawleyville is located along County Route J31, 5.9 miles (9.5 km) east-northeast of Clarinda.

== History ==
Hawleyville was platted in 1853, and named after James Hawley, a local merchant. Hawleyville's population was 82 in 1902. The population was 50 in 1940.
