= Crawford, Oklahoma =

Crawford
- Unincorporated community
- Location within the state of Oklahoma Crawford (the United States)
- Coordinates: 35°49′37″N 99°47′58″W
- Country: United States
- State: Oklahoma
- County: Roger Mills
- Elevation: 2,330 ft (710 m)
- Time zone: UTC-6 (Central (CST))
  - Summer (DST): UTC-5 (CDT)
- ZIP codes: 73638
- GNIS feature ID: 1101374

Crawford is a rural unincorporated community located in Roger Mills County, Oklahoma, United States. The community's post office was established on September 12, 1902, and it currently uses the ZIP Code 73638. Crawford is believed to have been named after the Louis Crawford ranch.

In 1915, Crawford was notable for being home to the Crawford Telephone Company, a public service corporation that operated a switchboard within the community. Today, the area is served by the Dobson Telephone Company, within the Cheyenne Boundary.

Nearby, to the south-southwest of Crawford, is Spring Creek Lake, which adds to the rural and natural landscape of the area.
