= Freeborn, Minnesota =

City in Minnesota, United States

Freeborn
- City
- Location of Freeborn, Minnesota
- Coordinates: 43°45′57″N 93°33′52″W
- Country: United States
- State: Minnesota
- County: Freeborn

Area
  - Total: 0.18 sq mi (0.47 km^{2})
  - Land: 0.18 sq mi (0.47 km^{2})
  - Water: 0 sq mi (0.00 km^{2})
- Elevation: 1,237 ft (377 m)

Population (2020)
  - Total: 264
  - Density: 1,441.0/sq mi (556.38/km^{2})
- Time zone: UTC-6 (Central (CST))
  - Summer (DST): UTC-5 (CDT)
- ZIP code: 56032
- Area code: 507
- FIPS code: 27-22526
- GNIS feature ID: 2394819
- Website: https://cityoffreebornmn.com/

Freeborn is a city in Freeborn County, Minnesota, United States. The population was 264 at the 2020 census.

== History ==
Freeborn was platted in 1857, and was incorporated in 1949. The city of Freeborn, like its namesake county, the surrounding township, and Freeborn Lake, upon which the city is situated, derives its name from William Freeborn, a member of Minnesota's Territorial Legislature. A post office has remained in continuous operation at Freeborn since 1857.

== Geography ==
According to the United States Census Bureau, the city has a total area of 0.18 square miles (0.47 km^{2}), all land.

Freeborn is located within Freeborn Township, in the far northwestern corner of Freeborn County, some 15 miles northwest of Albert Lea, the county seat. The City is at the junction of three County highways; County Hwy 29, which runs generally east and west, connecting State Hwy 13 and State Hwy 107, respectively; County Highway 6, which runs generally north and south along the westernmost edge of town; and County Highway 10, which originates at its intersection with County 29, and runs generally northward, ending at MN Hwy 30.

== Demographics ==
Historical population
Census	Pop.	Note	%±
1880	72		—
1890	89		23.6%
1960	314		—
1970	296		−5.7%
1980	323		9.1%
1990	301		−6.8%
2000	305		1.3%
2010	297		−2.6%
2020	264		−11.1%
U.S. Decennial Census

=== 2010 census ===
As of the census of 2010, there were 297 people, 120 households, and 84 families residing in the city. The population density was 1,650.0 inhabitants per square mile (637.1/km^{2}). There were 130 housing units at an average density of 722.2 per square mile (278.8/km^{2}). The racial makeup of the city was 98.3% White, 0.3% from other races, and 1.3% from two or more races. Hispanic or Latino of any race were 3.7% of the population.

Of the 120 households in the 2010 census, a total of 43, or 35.8%, had children under the age of 18 living with them, 65 (54.2%) were married couples living together, 13 (10.8%) had a female householder with no husband present, 6 (5.0%) had a male householder with no wife present, and 36 (30.0%) were non-families. Meanwhile, 30, or 25.0% of all households were made up of individuals, and 11 (9.2%) were a person living alone, age 65 years or older. The average household size was 2.48 persons, and the average family size was 2.95 persons.

The median age in the city was 38.9 years. Of Freeborn's 297 residents, 75, or 25.3% of residents were children under the age of 18; 23 (7.7%) were between the ages of 18 and 24; 70 (23.6%) were age 25 to 44; 83 (28.0%) were age 45 to 64; and 46 (15.5%) were 65 years of age or older. The gender makeup of the 297 residents was 151 (50.8%) males and 146 (49.2%) females.

=== 2000 census ===
As of the census of 2000, there were 305 people, or 1,706.2 persons per square mile (654.2/km^{2}). There were 136 housing units, at an average density of 760.8 units per square mile. (291.7/km^{2}). The racial makeup of the city was 99.02% White, 0.33% Native American, and 0.66% from two or more races. Hispanic or Latino of any race were 0.33% of the population.

For several years, Freeborn's summertime population would grow to approximately 450, due to the presence of the Jewish Chabad-Lubavitch Yeshiva summer camp, headquartered in the town's former K-12 school building, as well as the adjacent 8-acre campus. This camp brought nearly 150 boys to town, as well as camp counselors and educational staff, primarily from the Crown Heights area of the borough of Brooklyn, in New York City. The camp operated for several years, and discontinued after the 2014 season.

Of the 136 households, 23.7% had children under the age of 18 living with them, 59.5% were married couples living together, 4.6% had a female householder with no husband present, and 32.8% were non-families. 28.2% of all households were made up of individuals, and 14.5% had someone living alone who was 65 years of age or older. The average household size was 2.33 and the average family size was 2.81.

In the city, the population was spread out, with 20.0% under the age of 18, 7.5% from 18 to 24, 27.2% from 25 to 44, 25.2% from 45 to 64, and 20.0% who were 65 years of age or older. The median age was 41 years. For every 100 females, there were 99.3 males. For every 100 females age 18 and over, there were 103.3 males.

The median income for a household in the city was $38,500, and the median income for a family was $47,031. Males had a median income of $32,321 versus $20,000 for females. The per capita income for the city was $18,149. About 2.4% of families and 6.3% of the population were below the poverty line, including 5.3% of those under the age of eighteen and 6.5% of those 65 or over.

== Town newspaper ==
Freeborn has a small newspaper, known as 'The Freeborn Frisbee', which is produced quarterly, and appears in newsletter form. Founded in 1998, the paper contains informative articles and stories of local interest, generally about residents and the history of Freeborn. Among the regular features have been columns entitled "A View from the Point," an essay of observations on and near Hanson's Point, along the western shore of Freeborn Lake, and "From the Mayor's Desk," a chronicle of City Council matters of local interest.

=== Freeborn Area Heritage Society ===
The Freeborn Area Heritage Society is a local organization devoted to preserving and celebrating Freeborn's history. The Society maintains the picturesque District 15 School, a one-room schoolhouse, originally constructed in 1858 on a site 3 miles south of town. It was relocated to a city park in November, 2006, and rededicated on June 14, 2007, during the Freeborn Area Sesquicentennial. Restored by the Society, the building is filled with classroom items and historic exhibits, reflecting the years between 1858 and 1937, during which the school was in operation.

Immediately adjacent to the school, a newly-constructed Museum building contains a large and varied assortment of community and local artifacts, displayed around the Museum's two prized centerpieces: the Freeborn Fire Department's vintage 1946 fire truck, and a carefully-restored 1928 Model T Ford, purchased new from a Freeborn automobile dealer that year. The Model T, which remained in the family of the original owner for over 80 years, was generously donated to the community, and, along with the fire truck, remains on permanent display at the Museum.

The Museum also features records, yearbooks, and regalia from the former Freeborn High School, which closed in 1987, as well as the FHS athletic teams, the Freeborn Yeomen. This nickname was unique to Freeborn; no other high school in America is known to have had the Yeomen mascot; the school's colors were orange and black. There are also trophies from FHS's many successful athletic teams, competing in the Border League and Southern Minny Conferences, as well as voluminous records from their years in those athletic conferences.

== FFA Corn Drive ==
FFA Corn Drives for Camp Courage first began in 1964, originating that year with the Freeborn High School Chapter of the Future Farmers of America, or FFA. During the initial Corn Drive that year, members of the Freeborn FFA chapter walked acres of newly-harvested fields of area farmers, picking up ears of corn left behind by the machinery. The corn was collected and sold, and the proceeds were given to Camp Courage, a northern Minnesota summer camp for special-needs children. The first Corn Drive raised $87. Freeborn High School teacher and FFA advisor Lee Asche was instrumental in starting this enterprise, and promoting it statewide.

As a direct result of the efforts of Lee Asche, dozens of FFA chapters, representing high schools throughout the state of Minnesota, continue to raise money through Corn Drives of their own, largely through donations of corn or cash from their own area farmers. Nearly 60 years after the initial Corn Drive by the Freeborn FFA, funds are still donated to the successor organization of the original Camp Courage, now known statewide as True Friends.
