= Rocky Ridge, Ohio =

- Village
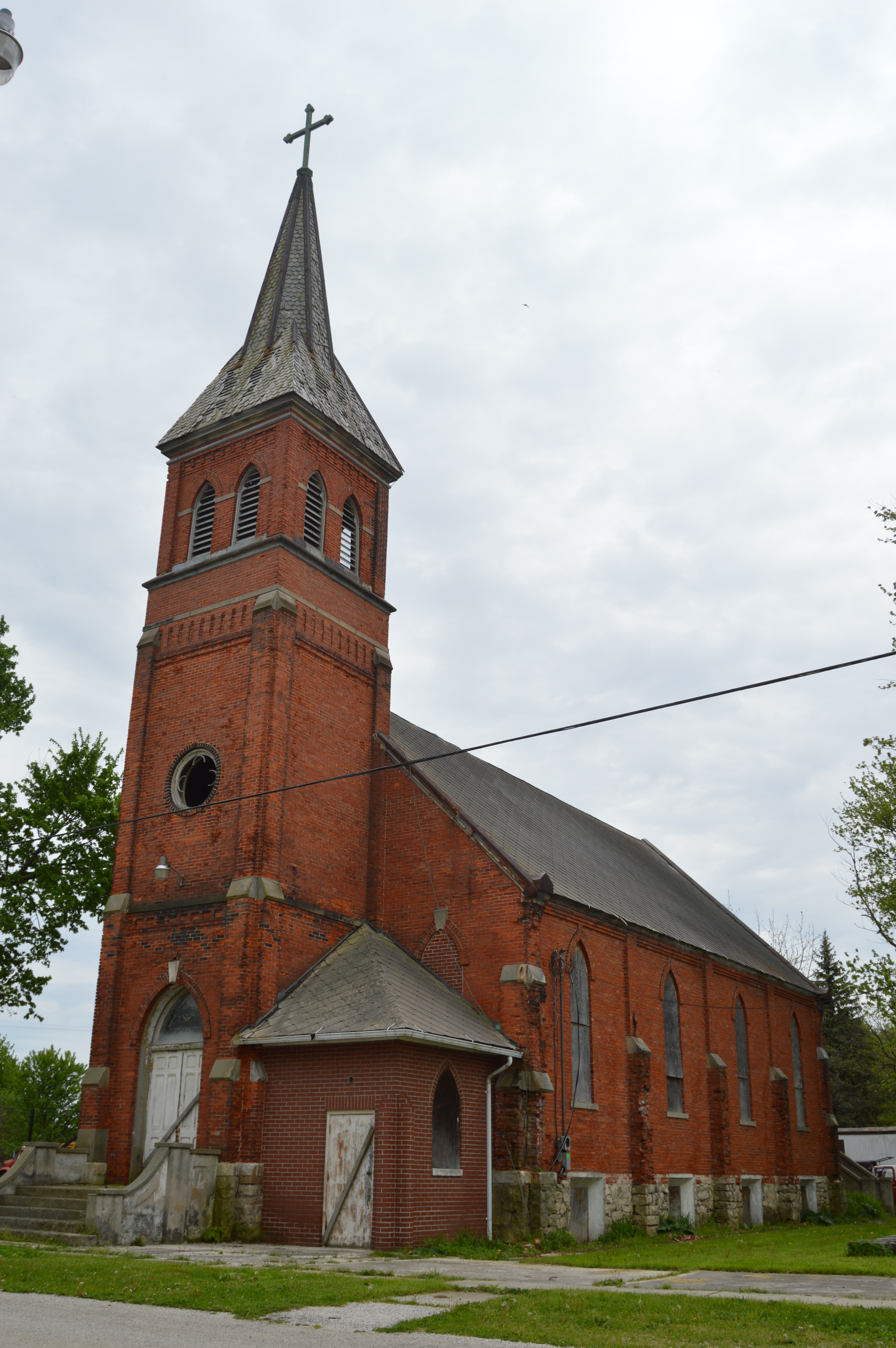
- Former St. John's Lutheran Church, Second Street

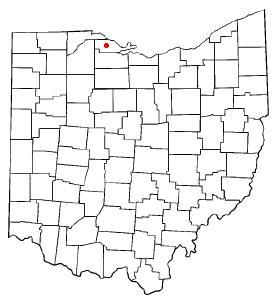
- Location of Rocky Ridge, Ohio

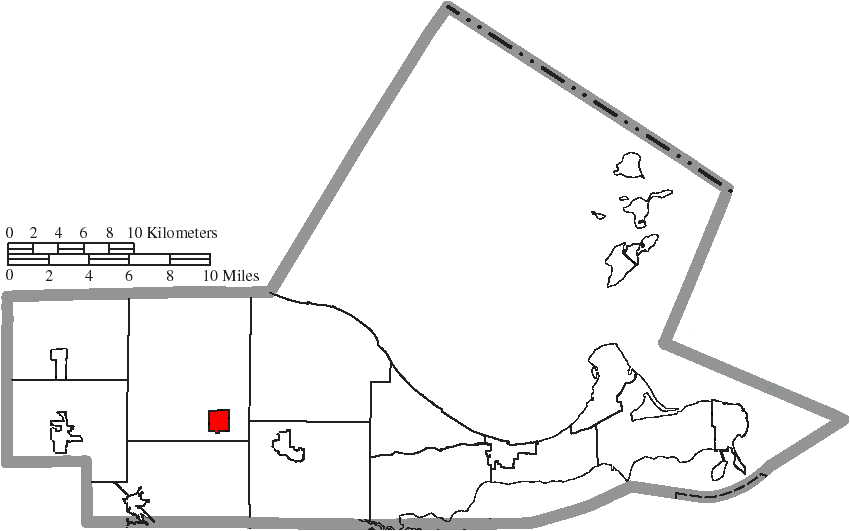
- Location of Rocky Ridge in Ottawa County
- Coordinates: 41°31′52″N 83°12′45″W
- Country: United States
- State: Ohio
- County: Ottawa

Government
  - Mayor: Dale Aikman

Area
  - Total: 1.02 sq mi (2.63 km^{2})
  - Land: 1.00 sq mi (2.59 km^{2})
  - Water: 0.015 sq mi (0.04 km^{2})
- Elevation: 607 ft (185 m)

Population (2020)
  - Total: 312
  - Density: 311.5/sq mi (120.27/km^{2})
- Time zone: UTC-5 (Eastern (EST))
  - Summer (DST): UTC-4 (EDT)
- ZIP code: 43458
- Area code: 419
- FIPS code: 39-68042
- GNIS feature ID: 2399109

Rocky Ridge is a village in Ottawa County, Ohio, United States. The population was 312 at the 2020 census.

== Geography ==
According to the United States Census Bureau, the village has a total area of 1.03 square miles (2.67 km^{2}), of which 1.01 square miles (2.62 km^{2}) is land and 0.02 square miles (0.05 km^{2}) is water.

== Demographics ==
Historical population
Census	Pop.	Note	%±
1890	483		—
1900	414		−14.3%
1910	349		−15.7%
1920	215		−38.4%
1930	213		−0.9%
1940	275		29.1%
1950	358		30.2%
1960	441		23.2%
1970	385		−12.7%
1980	457		18.7%
1990	425		−7.0%
2000	389		−8.5%
2010	417		7.2%
2020	312		−25.2%
U.S. Decennial Census

=== 2010 census ===
As of the census of 2010, there were 417 people, 159 households, and 112 families living in the village. The population density was 412.9 inhabitants per square mile (159.4/km^{2}). There were 179 housing units at an average density of 177.2 per square mile (68.4/km^{2}). The racial makeup of the village was 95.7% White, 0.5% Native American, 1.2% from other races, and 2.6% from two or more races. Hispanic or Latino of any race were 5.0% of the population.

There were 159 households, of which 35.2% had children under the age of 18 living with them, 52.2% were married couples living together, 10.7% had a female householder with no husband present, 7.5% had a male householder with no wife present, and 29.6% were non-families. 24.5% of all households were made up of individuals, and 8.8% had someone living alone who was 65 years of age or older. The average household size was 2.62 and the average family size was 3.15.

The median age in the village was 38.9 years. 27.6% of residents were under the age of 18; 6.3% were between the ages of 18 and 24; 24.1% were from 25 to 44; 30.9% were from 45 to 64; and 11.3% were 65 years of age or older. The gender makeup of the village was 51.6% male and 48.4% female.

=== 2000 census ===
As of the census of 2000, there were 389 people, 131 households, and 102 families living in the village. The population density was 382.2 inhabitants per square mile (147.6/km^{2}). There were 141 housing units at an average density of 138.5 per square mile (53.5/km^{2}). The racial makeup of the village was 98.20% White, 0.77% from other races, and 1.03% from two or more races. Hispanic or Latino of any race were 6.43% of the population.

There were 131 households, out of which 43.5% had children under the age of 18 living with them, 60.3% were married couples living together, 11.5% had a female householder with no husband present, and 21.4% were non-families. 18.3% of all households were made up of individuals, and 8.4% had someone living alone who was 65 years of age or older. The average household size was 2.97 and the average family size was 3.33.

In the village, the population was spread out, with 31.6% under the age of 18, 7.7% from 18 to 24, 31.4% from 25 to 44, 19.3% from 45 to 64, and 10.0% who were 65 years of age or older. The median age was 34 years. For every 100 females there were 103.7 males. For every 100 females age 18 and over, there were 100.0 males.

The median income for a household in the village was $38,281, and the median income for a family was $40,469. Males had a median income of $38,438 versus $23,906 for females. The per capita income for the village was $15,276. About 12.1% of families and 13.8% of the population were below the poverty line, including 18.4% of those under age 18 and 11.1% of those age 65 or over.
