= Weavertown, Berks County, Pennsylvania =

Unincorporated community in Pennsylvania, U.S.

Coordinates: 40°18′21″N 75°45′08″W

Weavertown is an unincorporated community in Amity Township, Berks County, Pennsylvania, United States. It is located approximately 3.6 miles north of Amity Gardens on Pennsylvania Route 662 (Old Swede Road) and is served by the Daniel Boone Area School District.

== History ==
Weavertown was named after Colonel Jacob Roth Weaver (1751–1831), who commanded the local Pennsylvania Militia and fought the Battle of Brandywine in the Revolutionary War. His father Peter also resided in Amity. Peter was one of the seven sons of Pioneer Jacob Weaver (Weber), who was a member of the Kocherthal Party and arrived on the shores of the Hudson River at Quassaic Kill, New York in January 1709. In 1725, he migrated to Amity Township with his family. Jacob (1678–1752) and his wife Anna Elisabethe (Parmentier) (1683–1769) are buried in St. Gabriel's Church (formerly known as the Molatton Church). Peter (1715–1779) and Jacob Roth Weaver are buried in St. Paul's Lutheran Church in Amityville. This general area (Oley Valley) was also settled by Daniel Boone's family (see the Daniel Boone Homestead) and the grandfather of Abraham Lincoln.
