= Lingo, New Mexico =

- Populated place
- Location within New Mexico Location within the United States
- Coordinates: 33°47′18″N 103°06′53″W
- Country: United States
- State: New Mexico
- County: Roosevelt
- Founded: 1916 (as "Need")
- Elevation: 3,983 ft (1,214 m)
- Time zone: UTC−07:00 (Mountain)
- ZIP code: 88123
- Area code: 575
- GNIS feature ID: 915847

Lingo is a populated place in Roosevelt County, New Mexico, United States.

== History ==
The original name given the settlement in 1916 was “Need”, but U.S. postal authorities said that it sounded much like “Weed” in Otero County, so in 1918 the name was changed to "Lingo".

The community post office was originally located three miles south of the current location on New Mexico State Road 114, seven miles south of Causey and five miles from the Texas border.

An early authority on New Mexico place names states the name was derived from the Southwestern colloquial term "lingo" (from Latin lingua tongue), but a later authority states that the name more likely resulted from a family name.
