= Hines House =

Hines House or Hines Farm may refer to:

- Hines House (Bowling Green, Kentucky), listed on the National Register of Historic Places (NRHP)
- Hines Round Barn, Sallisaw, Oklahoma, listed on the NRHP in Sequoyah County, Oklahoma
- Pierre Rossiter and Charlotte Hines House, Portland, Oregon, listed on the NRHP in Multnomah County, Oregon
- Hines House (Bozeman, Montana), listed on the NRHP in Gallatin County, Montana
- Hollingsworth-Hines Farm, Turkey, North Carolina, listed on the NRHP in Sampson County, North Carolina
- E. M. Hines House, Waxahachie, Texas, listed on the NRHP in Ellis County, Texas
- Hines Mansion, Provo, Utah, listed on the NRHP in Utah County, Utah
