= National Register of Historic Places listings in Sequoyah County, Oklahoma =

Location of Sequoyah County in Oklahoma

This is a list of the National Register of Historic Places listings in Sequoyah County, Oklahoma.

This is intended to be a complete list of the properties on the National Register of Historic Places in Sequoyah County, Oklahoma, United States. The locations of National Register properties for which the latitude and longitude coordinates are included below, may be seen in a map.

There are 14 properties listed on the National Register in the county, including 1 National Historic Landmark.

This National Park Service list is complete through NPS recent listings posted October 23, 2026.

== Current listings ==
	Name on the Register	Image	Date listed	Location	City or town	Description
1	Baker "A" Archeological Site (34SQ269)	Baker "A" Archeological Site (34SQ269)	March 2, 1990 (#90000125)	Address Restricted	Short	
2	Citizen's State Bank	Citizen's State Bank	September 8, 1980 (#80003300)	Seminole and Main Sts. 35°34′49″N 94°49′55″W	Marble City	
3	Dwight Mission	Dwight Mission	March 20, 1973 (#73001570)	3 miles southwest of Marble City; 35°32′51″N 94°51′09″W	Marble City	
4	Ellison No. 2 Site (34SQ85)	Ellison No. 2 Site (34SQ85)	August 11, 1988 (#88001234)	Address Restricted	Short	
5	Judge Franklin Faulkner House	Judge Franklin Faulkner House	March 13, 1980 (#80003301)	E. Cherokee St. 35°27′40″N 94°46′30″W	Sallisaw	
6	Fears Site (34SQ76)	Fears Site (34SQ76)	August 11, 1988 (#88001235)	Address Restricted	Nicut	
7	First Presbyterian Church	First Presbyterian Church	March 7, 2003 (#03000096)	120 S. Oak St. 35°27′27″N 94°47′17″W	Sallisaw	
8	Hines Round Barn	Hines Round Barn	March 8, 1984 (#84003432)	401 S. Adams St. 35°26′55″N 94°47′17″W	Sallisaw	
9	Kirby-Steely Archeological Site	Kirby-Steely Archeological Site	April 3, 1991 (#91000356)	Address Restricted	Short	
10	Lee's Creek Ceremonial Site	Lee's Creek Ceremonial Site	January 31, 1976 (#76001575)	Address Restricted	Short	
11	Sallisaw High School	Sallisaw High School	July 3, 1997 (#97000614)	200 W. Creek St. 35°27′25″N 94°47′29″W	Sallisaw	Only outer walls of main entrance remained after fire. The site was demolished in February 2015.
12	Sequoyah's Cabin	Sequoyah's Cabin	October 15, 1966 (#66000634)	State Highway 101, in Sequoyah's Cabin State Park; 35°30′47″N 94°39′07″W	Akins	
13	Starr Pasture Archeological Site (34SQ224)	Starr Pasture Archeological Site (34SQ224)	March 2, 1990 (#90000126)	Address Restricted	Short	
14	Tall Cane Archeological Site (34SQ294)	Tall Cane Archeological Site (34SQ294)	March 2, 1990 (#90000127)	Address Restricted	Short	

== See also ==
- List of National Historic Landmarks in Oklahoma
- National Register of Historic Places listings in Oklahoma
