= Slack–Comstock–Marshall Farm =

- U.S. National Register of Historic Places
- Location within Arkansas Location within the United States
- Location: North of AR 220 West, Uniontown, Arkansas
- Coordinates: 35°35′21″N 94°27′7″W
- Area: 2 acres (0.81 ha)
- Built: 1918
- Architect: Van Slack; Hardy Comstock
- Architectural style: Late Victorian, Folk Victorian
- NRHP reference No.: 95000694
- Added to NRHP: June 9, 1995

The Slack–Comstock–Marshall Farm is a farm in Uniontown, Arkansas. Built in 1918, the farmhouse was constructed in the Plain Traditional style and has an uncommon vernacular design. The house was originally built as a small building and was later expanded by adding rooms, a common practice at the time. However, the Slack–Comstock–Marshall farmhouse is unusual in that it was expanded by a large three-room, 1 1/2-story addition with a cross gable roof. A wraparound porch was also added to the house to integrate the large addition with the rest of the design. The farm was used by three families to raise livestock and grow cotton, corn, and strawberries; it was sold by the descendants of the Marshall family in 2019; the new owners have recently completed a ground up restoration while honoring the original uncommon vernacular design and exterior details .

The farm was added to the National Register of Historic Places on June 9, 1995.

== Gallery ==
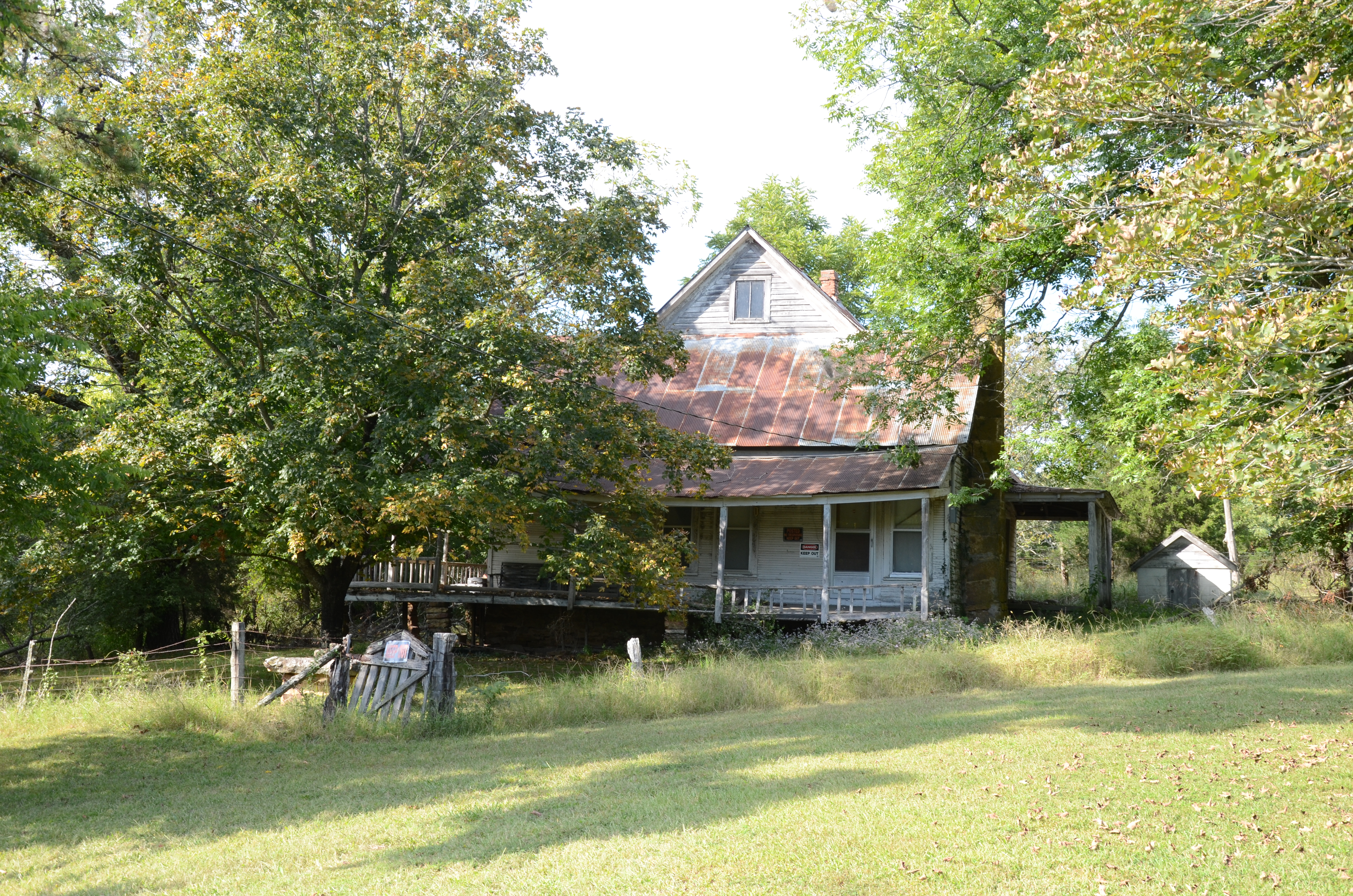
Front view of the farm house

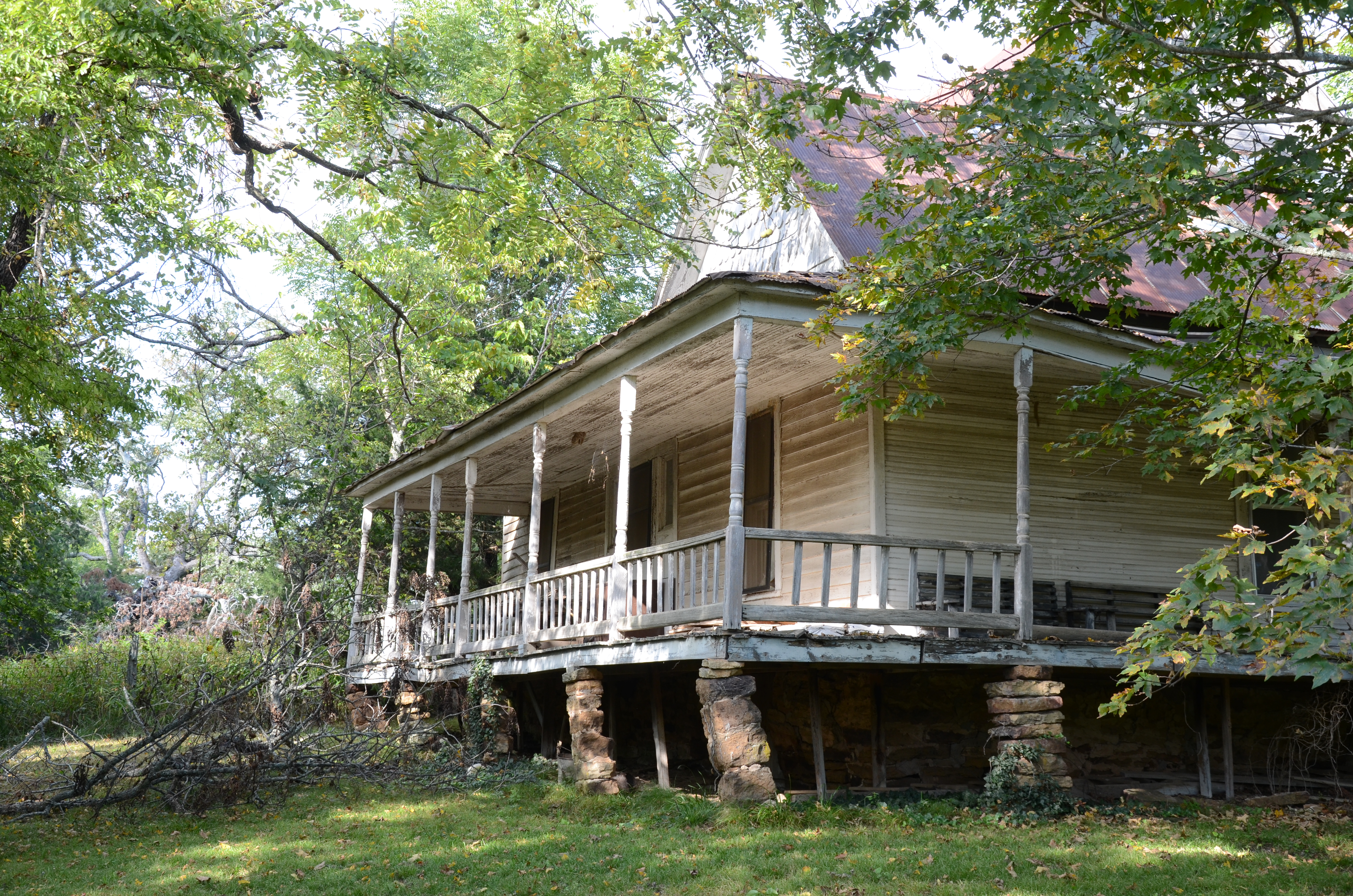
West porch of the farm house

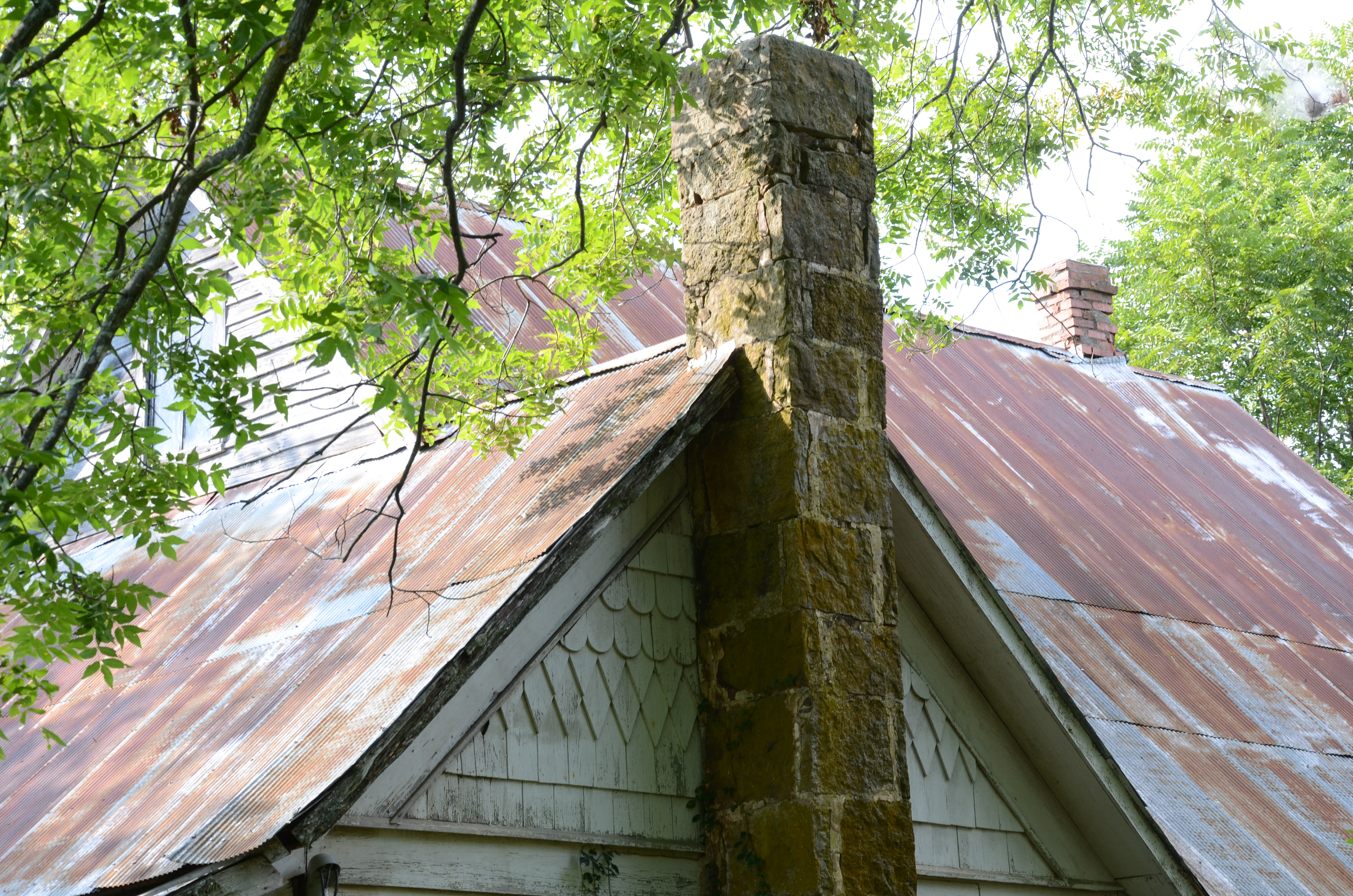
Detail of the farm house showing gable, chimney, and roof
