= Oklahoma State Highway 101 =

State highway in Oklahoma, United States

State Highway 101
- SH-101 highlighted in red

Route information
- Maintained by ODOT
- Length: 23.4 mi (37.7 km)

Major junctions
- West end: US 59 north of Sallisaw
- East end: AR 220 at the Arkansas state line near Short

Location
- Country: United States
- State: Oklahoma

Highway system
- Oklahoma State Highway System; Interstate; US; State; Turnpikes
← SH-100	→ SH-102

State Highway 101 is a 23.4-mile (37.7 km) state highway in Sequoyah Co., Oklahoma, in the United States. It runs from US-59 north of Sallisaw to the Arkansas state line. After crossing the line, it becomes Highway 220.

The highway connects to Sequoyah's Cabin, the home of Sequoyah, the man who invented the Cherokee alphabet. SH-101 has no lettered spurs.

== Route description ==
State Highway 101 begins at US-59 approximately 3 miles (4.8 km) north of Sallisaw. From this terminus, SH-101 travels due east, crossing over Little Sallisaw Creek shortly before passing through the unincorporated place of Akins. Two miles (3.2 km) east of Akins, the road makes a sharp turn northward. During this 1-mile (1.6 km)-long stretch of north–south roadway, the road passes Sequoyah's Cabin. The road gradually curves back to the east as it crosses Big Skin Bayou. Upon encountering Black Creek, a tributary of the bayou, the road makes an abrupt turn back to the north.

Another gradual curve returns SH-101 to an east–west alignment which persists until the junction with State Highway 64B near Eagle Mountain. This is the northern terminus of the highway, which heads south to Muldrow and eventually to Interstate 40. SH-101 continues north from this point, curving around the mountain and proceeding along a very winding route. During this section, the road crosses Polecat Creek and Little Lee Creek. After a short southeast section, SH-101 turns to a due east alignment, crossing Big Lee Creek on a narrow through truss bridge and passing just north of the unincorporated CDP of Short. The highway then gradually stairsteps northeast, culminating in a brief north–south section along the Oklahoma–Arkansas state line. The roadbed then curves east, entering Arkansas and the Ozark National Forest, and becoming Highway 220 toward Uniontown.

== Junction list ==
The entire route is in Sequoyah County.

Location	mi	km	Destinations	Notes
	0.0	0.0	US 59	Western terminus
	13.0	20.9	SH-64B	Northern terminus of SH-64B
	23.4	37.7	AR 220	Arkansas state line; eastern terminus
1.000 mi = 1.609 km; 1.000 km = 0.621 mi
