= Sequoyah's Cabin =

Historic house in Oklahoma, United States

- U.S. National Register of Historic Places
- U.S. National Historic Landmark
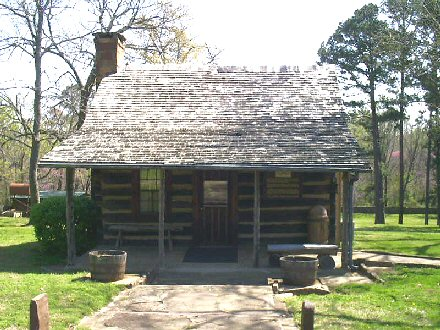
- A reproduction of the cabin standing outside the protective shelter

- Location within Oklahoma Location within the United States
- Location: 470288 Highway 101
- Nearest city: Akins, Oklahoma
- Coordinates: 35.51479°N 94.65220°W
- Area: 10 acres (4.0 ha)
- Built: 1829
- Architect: Sequoyah
- NRHP reference No.: 66000634

Significant dates
- Added to NRHP: October 15, 1966
- Designated NHL: December 21, 1965

Sequoyah's Cabin is a log cabin and historic site off Oklahoma State Highway 101 near Akins, Oklahoma. It was the home between 1829 and 1844 of the Cherokee Indian Sequoyah (also known as George Gist, c. 1765–1844), who in 1821 created a written language for the Cherokee Nation. The cabin and surrounding park was declared a National Historic Landmark in 1965 and is now owned by the Cherokee Nation.

== Description ==
Sequoyah's Cabin is located east of Akins on the east side of State Highway 101 at a point where it makes a northward jog. The cabin itself is a single-story log structure with a gabled roof, on 10 acres (4.0 ha) of land that has a park-like setting. The cabin is now sheltered from the elements by a brick structure built in the 1930s. There is a bronze statue of Sequoyah outside. The house is maintained as a historic house museum and is furnished to appear as it might have when Sequoyah lived there. There are relics and documents associated with his life.

== History ==
Sequoyah was born about 1770 to a Cherokee mother and a white or half-white father, on the ancestral lands of the Cherokee in the southeastern United States. Unschooled except in tribal ways and customs, he came to understand the value of writing, especially in dealing with adjacent British settlers. In 1809 he began to work on a writing system for the Cherokee language. The result of his work, the Cherokee syllabary, continues to be used today. In the 1820s he moved west, to instruct western Cherokees in the writing system. It is during this period that this cabin was built, in 1829.

The cabin was acquired by the Oklahoma Historical Society in 1936. The shelter over the building was built by the Works Progress Administration in 1936, and is surrounded by a 10-acre (40,000 m^{2}) park.

The cabin and surrounding park, now owned by the Cherokee Nation, was declared a National Historic Landmark in 1965. And, as for all other already-designated National Historic Landmarks, it was automatically listed on the new National Register of Historic Places on October 15, 1966.

In 2016, the Cherokee Nation purchased the cabin and its property for $100,000.

== See also ==
- List of National Historic Landmarks in Oklahoma
- National Register of Historic Places listings in Sequoyah County, Oklahoma
