= Judge Franklin Faulkner House =

- U.S. National Register of Historic Places
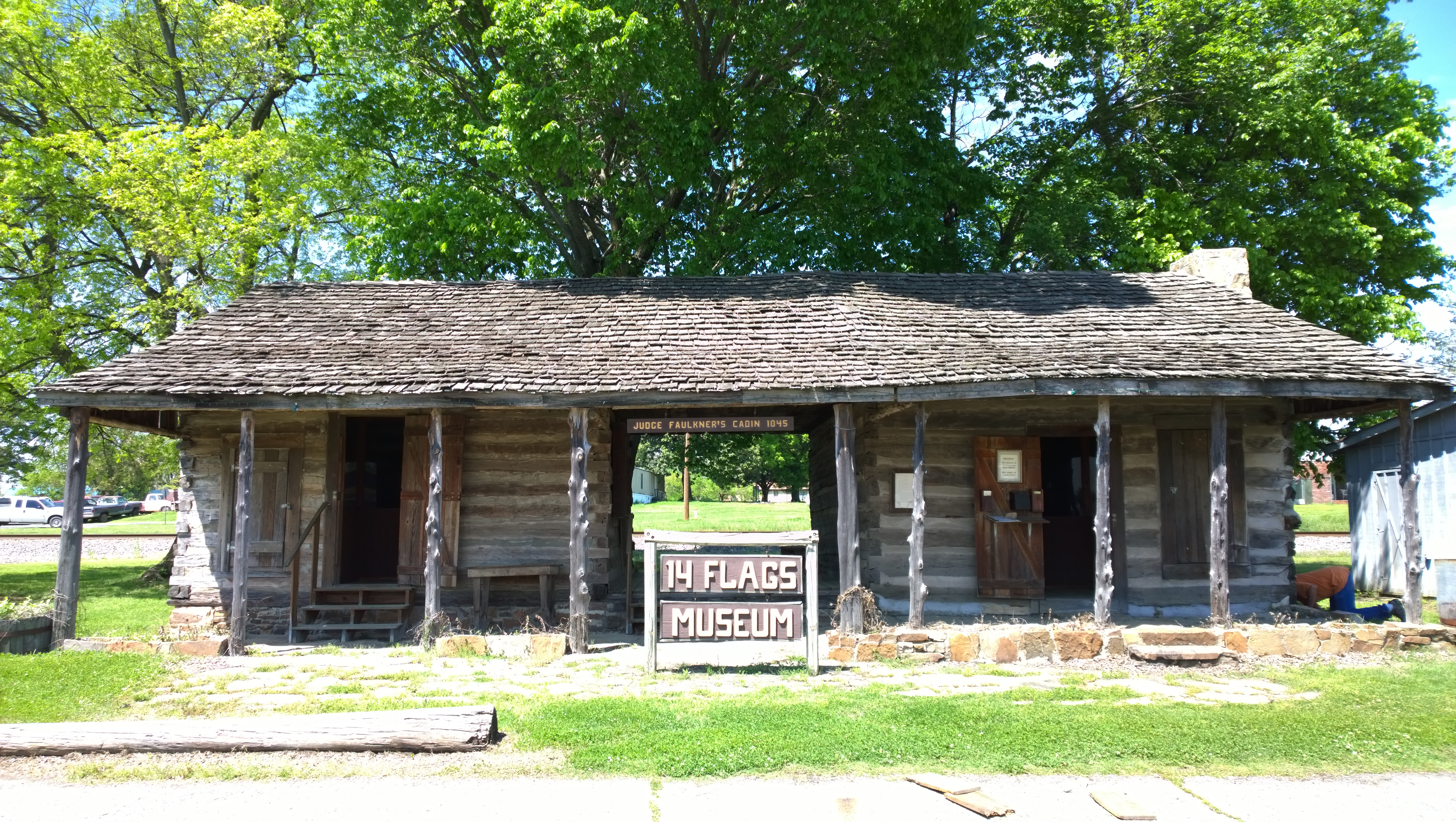

- Location within Oklahoma
- Location: E. Cherokee St., Sallisaw, Oklahoma
- Coordinates: 35°27′40″N 94°46′30″W
- Area: less than one acre
- Built: c.1845
- Architectural style: Log house
- NRHP reference No.: 80003301
- Added to NRHP: March 13, 1980

The Judge Franklin Faulkner House, now the 14 Flags Museum, was built around 1845 and is now located on E. Cherokee St. in Sallisaw, Oklahoma. It was listed on the National Register of Historic Places in 1980.

It was a 18 by 18 feet (5.5 m × 5.5 m) log cabin. It was moved in 1956 about six miles to downtown Sallisaw.

It has also been known as Faulkner Cabin.

Relatively recent photo shows a double pen log cabin. However photos from 1979 and 1980 show a single pen cabin.

== See also ==
- List of museums in Oklahoma
- National Register of Historic Places listings in Sequoyah County, Oklahoma
