= Hines House (Bowling Green, Kentucky) =

Historic house in Kentucky, United States

- U.S. National Register of Historic Places
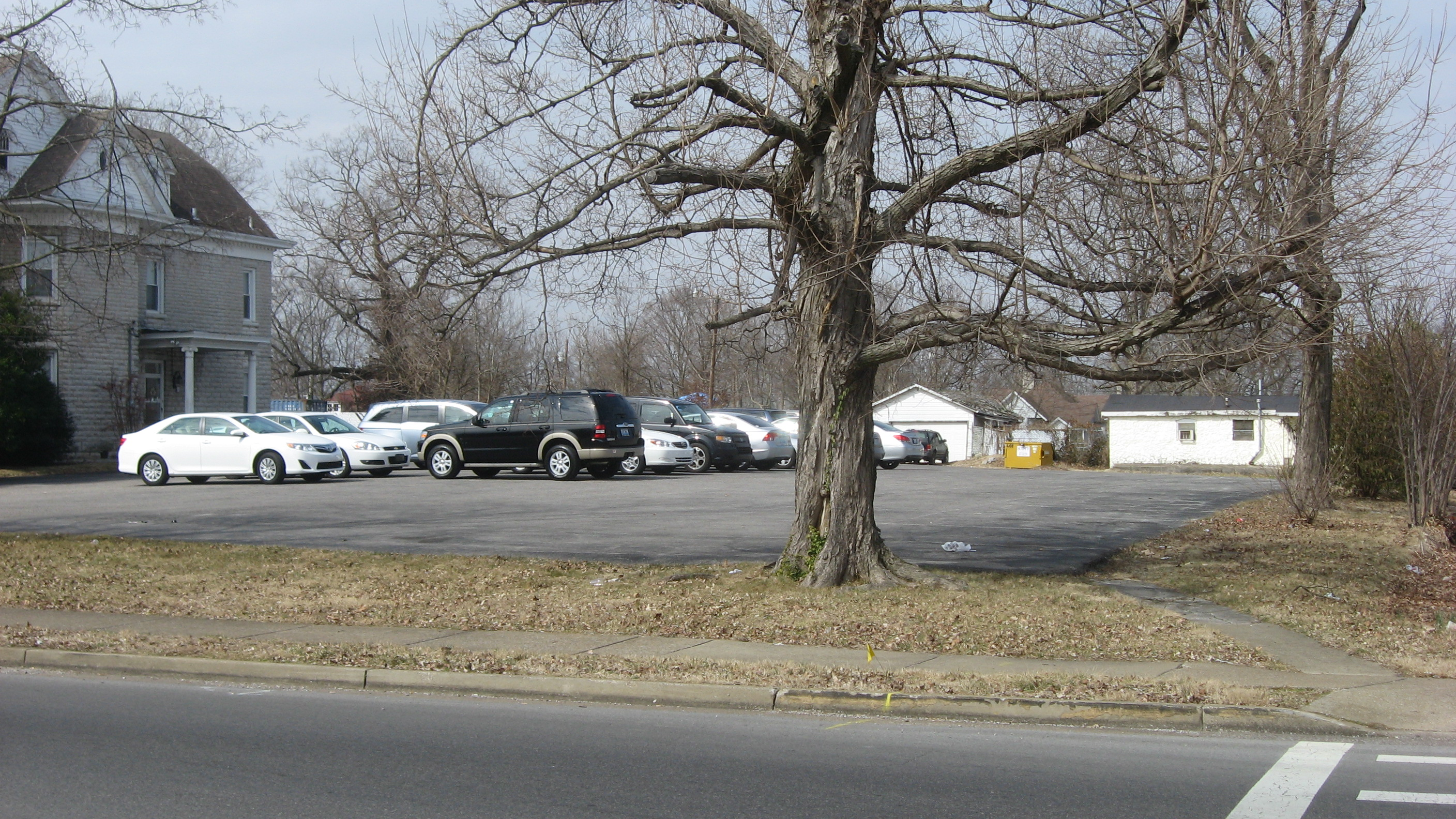
- Site of the house

- Location within Kentucky Location within the United States
- Location: 1103 Adams St., Bowling Green, Kentucky
- Coordinates: 36°59′43″N 86°26′51″W
- Area: 0 acres (0 ha)
- Built: 1840
- Architectural style: Federal
- MPS: Warren County MRA
- NRHP reference No.: 79003518
- Added to NRHP: December 18, 1979

The Hines House was a historic building in Bowling Green, Kentucky. It was written into the National Register of Historic Places on December 18, 1979. It was built by the Reverend James Davis Hines around 1840. Hines eventually sold the building to N.E. Goodsall, whose heirs sold the house in 1859 to Doctor Albert Covington.

When it was added to the National Register, it was one of few houses left in Bowling Green of that age and structure. The house was destroyed by an intentionally set fire on February 12, 1995.
