= Uniontown, Arkansas =

- Census-designated place
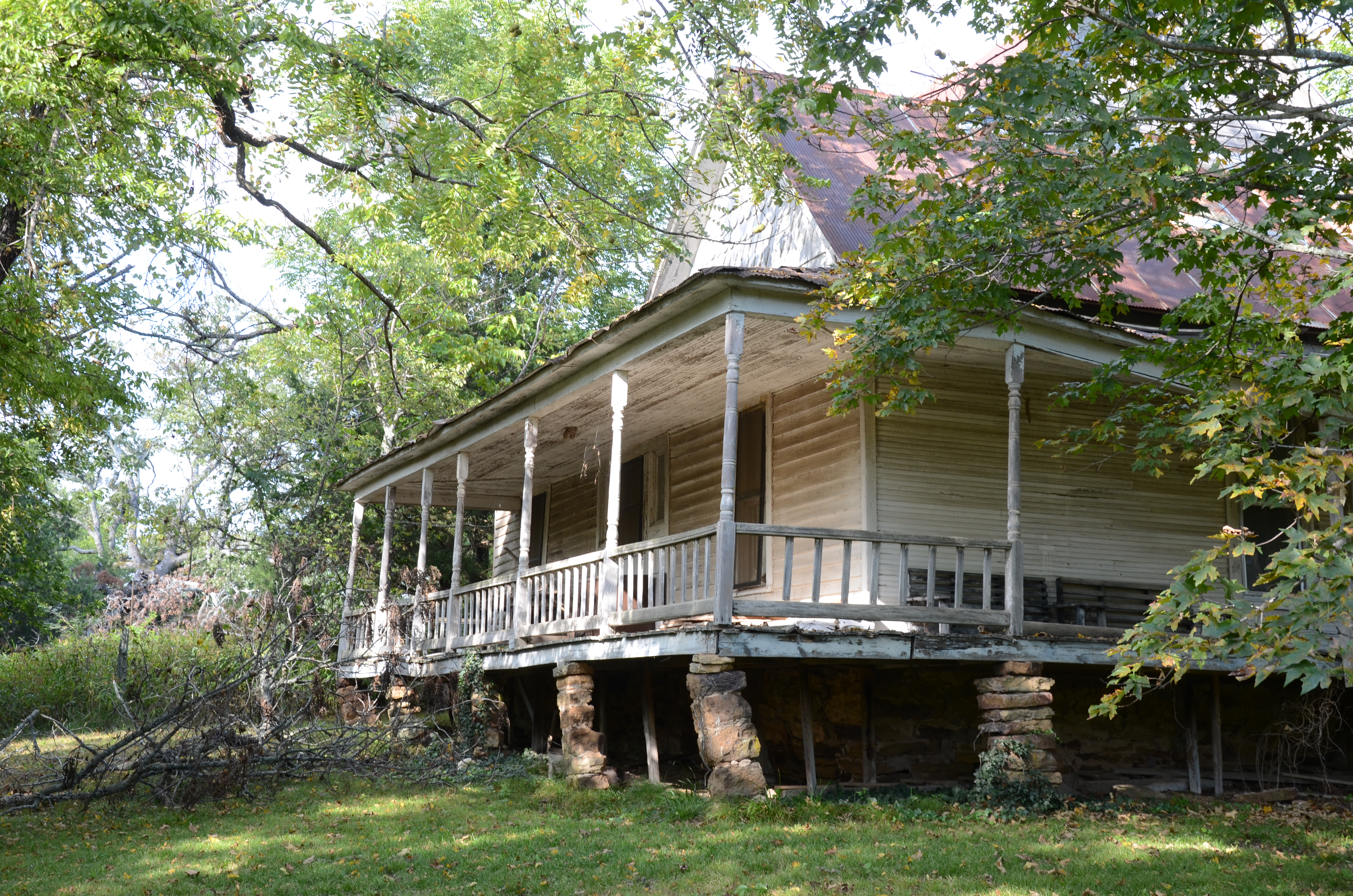
- Slack-Comstock-Marshall Farm

- Location within Arkansas Location within the United States
- Coordinates: 35°35′04″N 94°26′39″W
- Country: United States
- State: Arkansas
- County: Crawford
- Elevation: 866 ft (264 m)

Population (2020)
  - Total: 112
- Time zone: UTC-6 (Central (CST))
  - Summer (DST): UTC-5 (CDT)
- ZIP code: 72955
- Area code: 479
- GNIS feature ID: 2805689

Uniontown is an unincorporated community and census-designated place (CDP) in Crawford County, Arkansas, United States. It is located on Arkansas Highway 220 near the Oklahoma border, 4.5 miles (7.2 km) west-northwest of Cedarville. Uniontown has a post office with ZIP code 72955.

It was first listed as a CDP in the 2020 census with a population of 112.

== History ==
The first permanent settlement at Uniontown was made in the 1840s by the Howell family. A post office has been in operation at Uniontown since 1881.

Slack-Comstock-Marshall Farm, which is listed on the National Register of Historic Places, is located in the community.

== Demographics ==
Historical population
Census	Pop.	Note	%±
2020	112		—
U.S. Decennial Census; 2020

=== 2020 census ===
Uniontown CDP, Arkansas – Racial and ethnic composition Note: the US Census treats Hispanic/Latino as an ethnic category. This table excludes Latinos from the racial categories and assigns them to a separate category. Hispanics/Latinos may be of any race.
Race / Ethnicity (NH = Non-Hispanic)	Pop 2020	% 2020
White alone (NH)	91	81.25%
Black or African American alone (NH)	0	0.00%
Native American or Alaska Native alone (NH)	7	6.25%
Asian alone (NH)	2	1.79%
Pacific Islander alone (NH)	0	0.00%
Some Other Race alone (NH)	0	0.00%
Mixed Race or Multi-Racial (NH)	11	9.82%
Hispanic or Latino (any race)	1	0.89%
Total	112	100.00%
