= First Presbyterian Church (Sallisaw, Oklahoma) =

Historic church in Oklahoma, United States

- U.S. National Register of Historic Places
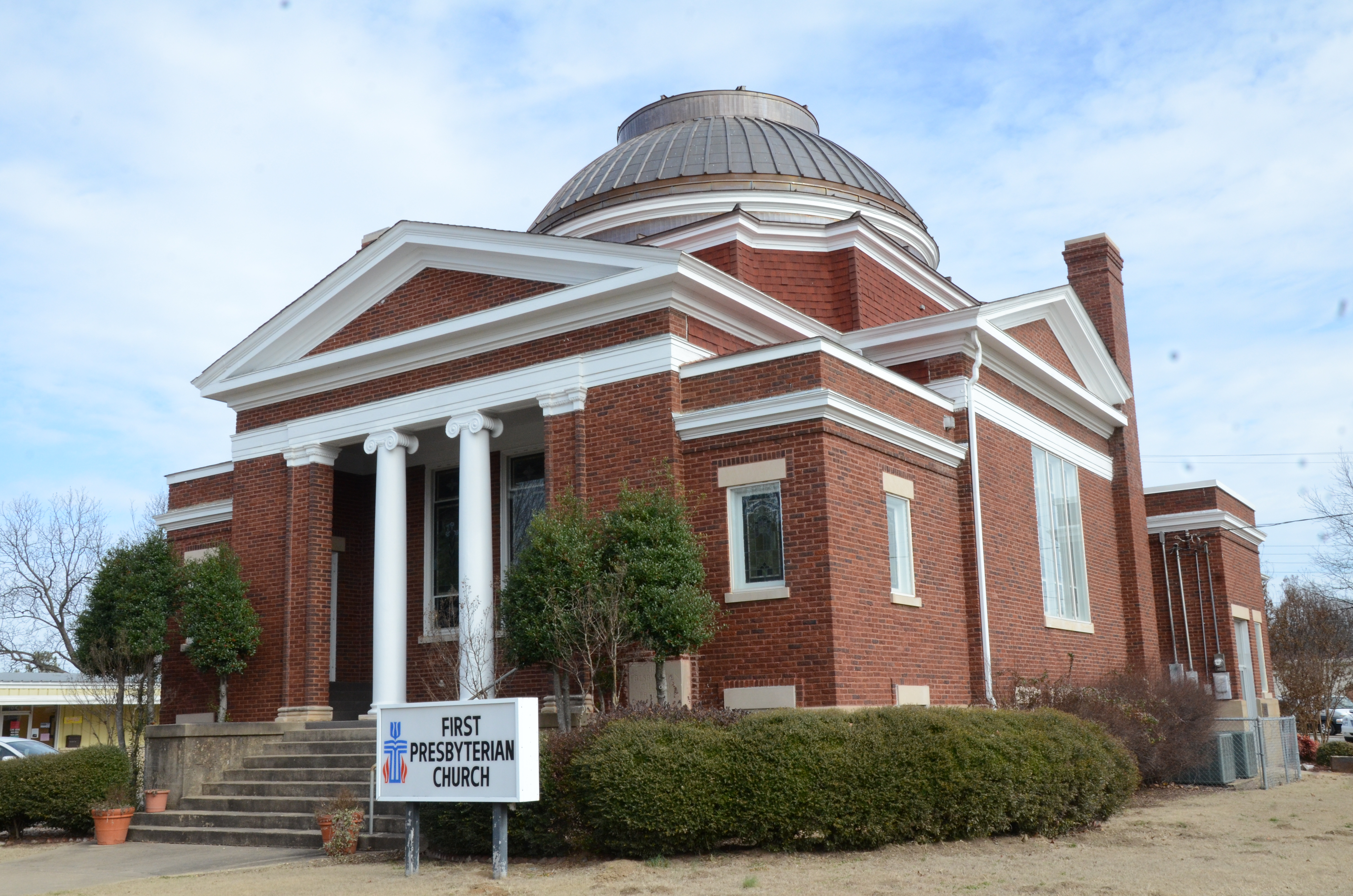

- Location within Oklahoma Location within the United States
- Location: 120 S. Oak St., P.O. Box 417 Sallisaw, Oklahoma
- Coordinates: 35°27′27″N 94°47′17″W
- Area: less than one acre
- Built: 1918
- Built by: J.T. Fineton & Son/H.P. Culp
- Architectural style: Classical Revival
- NRHP reference No.: 03000096
- Added to NRHP: March 7, 2003

The First Presbyterian Church in Sallisaw, Oklahoma was created from the merger of a Cumberland Presbyterian Church, which had been founded in 1898, and a Presbyterian Church in the U.S.A. The original building for the Cumberland Presbyterian Church, built in about 1903, had a steeple and a bell and its pastor during 187890456 to 1910 was "Uncle Jim" McDonald, or J.A. McDonald. Angus McDonald, his son, wrote of his father in the story "Old McDonald Had a Farm". The church burned in about 1916.

The new merged church's building at 120 S. Oak Street(mailing address: PO Box 417) in Sallisaw was built in 1918. It was added to the National Register of Historic Places in 2003. It was built using plans modified from those of another First Presbyterian Church building completed in 1916 in Van Buren, Arkansas. It was built at cost of $17,500 and has a dome about 40 feet (12 m) tall.
