= Pierre Rossiter and Charlotte Hines House =

House in Portland, Oregon, U.S.

- U.S. National Register of Historic Places
- Portland Historic Landmark
- Location within Portland, Oregon Location within Oregon Location within the United States
- Location: 02393 SW Military Road; Portland, Oregon
- Coordinates: 45°26′34″N 122°39′17″W
- Area: 1.7 acres (0.69 ha)
- Built: 1927
- Architect: Wallwork, Carl Harding
- Architectural style: Colonial Revival
- NRHP reference No.: 02000660
- Added to NRHP: June 20, 2002

The Pierre Rossiter and Charlotte Hines House is a house located in Portland, Oregon listed on the National Register of Historic Places. Constructed in 1927, the house illustrates Colonial Revival architecture.
