= Arkansas Highway 220 =

State highway in Arkansas, United States

Highway 220

Route information
- Maintained by AHTD

Southern segment
- Length: 7.89 mi (12.70 km)
- West end: SH-101 near Uniontown
- East end: AR 59 at Dripping Springs

Northern segment
- Length: 17.04 mi (27.42 km)
- South end: AR 59 at Cedarville
- North end: AR 170 at Devil's Den State Park

Location
- Country: United States
- State: Arkansas
- Counties: Crawford, Washington

Highway system
- Arkansas Highway System; Interstate; US; State; Business; Spurs; Suffixed; Scenic; Heritage
← AR 219	→ AR 221

Arkansas Highway 220 is a designation for two state highways in west Arkansas. The southern segment of 7.89 miles (12.70 km) runs from Oklahoma State Highway 101 near Uniontown to AR 59. A northern segment of 17.04 miles (27.42 km) runs from AR 59 north to AR 170 in Devil's Den State Park. The route is not paved within Devil's Den State Park, and was the only Arkansas state highway that remains unpaved until a January 2016 announcement that paving would begin. As of summer 2018, the entire route is now fully paved.

== Route description ==
AR 220 begins at SH 101 at the Oklahoma state line and runs as the Uniontown Highway to meet AR 59 south of Cedarville.

The route begins again 4 miles (6.4 km) north, when the route turns northeast, ending at AR 170 in Devil's Den State Park.

== Major intersections ==
=== Southern segment ===
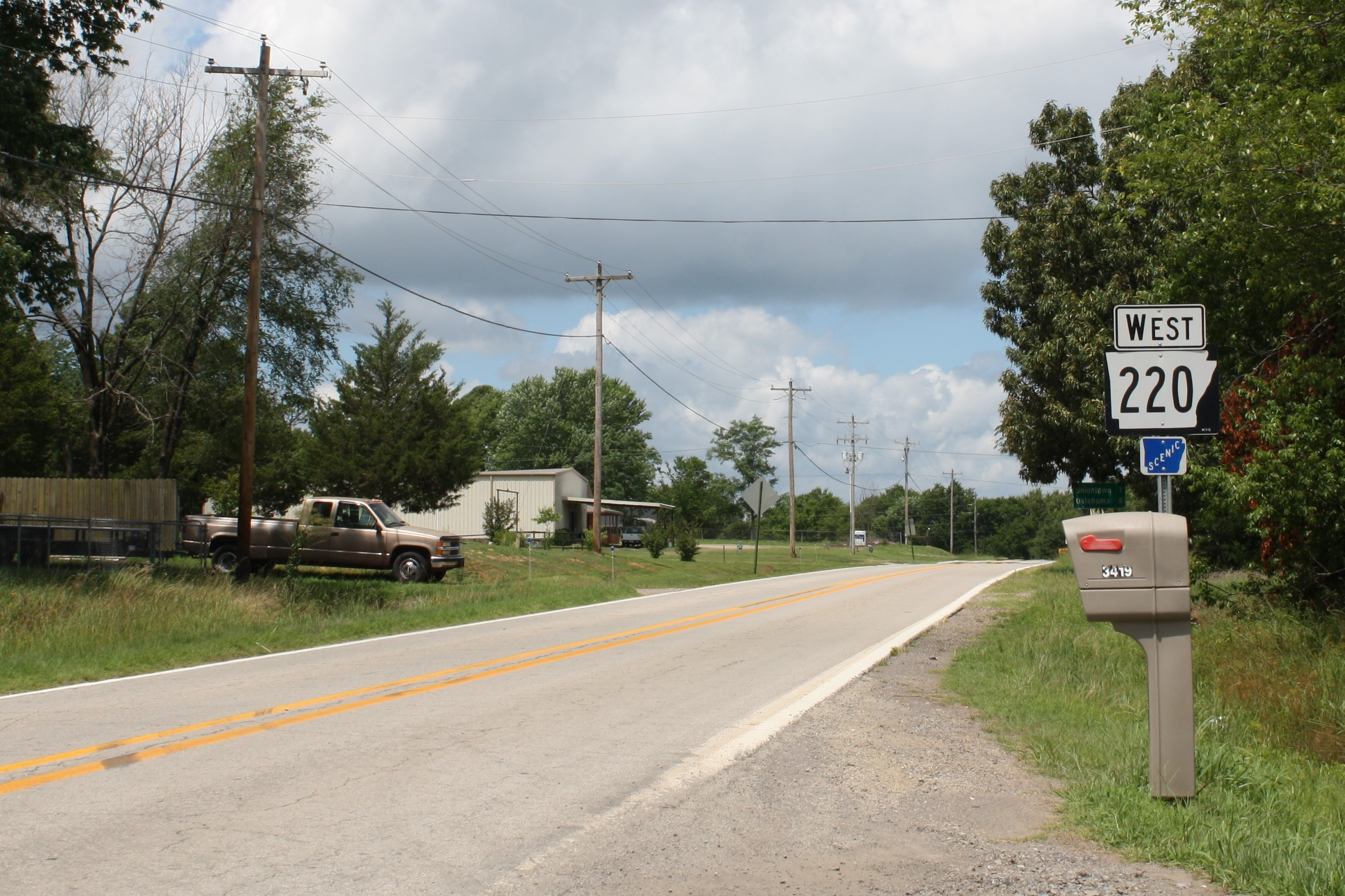
First reassurance marker past the eastern terminus

The entire route is in Crawford County.

Location	mi	km	Destinations	Notes
Uniontown	0.0	0.0	SH-101 – Short	
Dripping Springs	7.9	12.7	AR 59 – Cedarville, Van Buren	
1.000 mi = 1.609 km; 1.000 km = 0.621 mi

=== Northern segment ===
County	Location	mi	km	Destinations	Notes
Crawford	Cedarville	0.0	0.0	AR 59 – Van Buren, Evansville	
Washington	Devil's Den State Park	17.0	27.4	AR 170 to AR 74 – Fayetteville, Winslow	
1.000 mi = 1.609 km; 1.000 km = 0.621 mi
