= Hines Round Barn =

- U.S. National Register of Historic Places
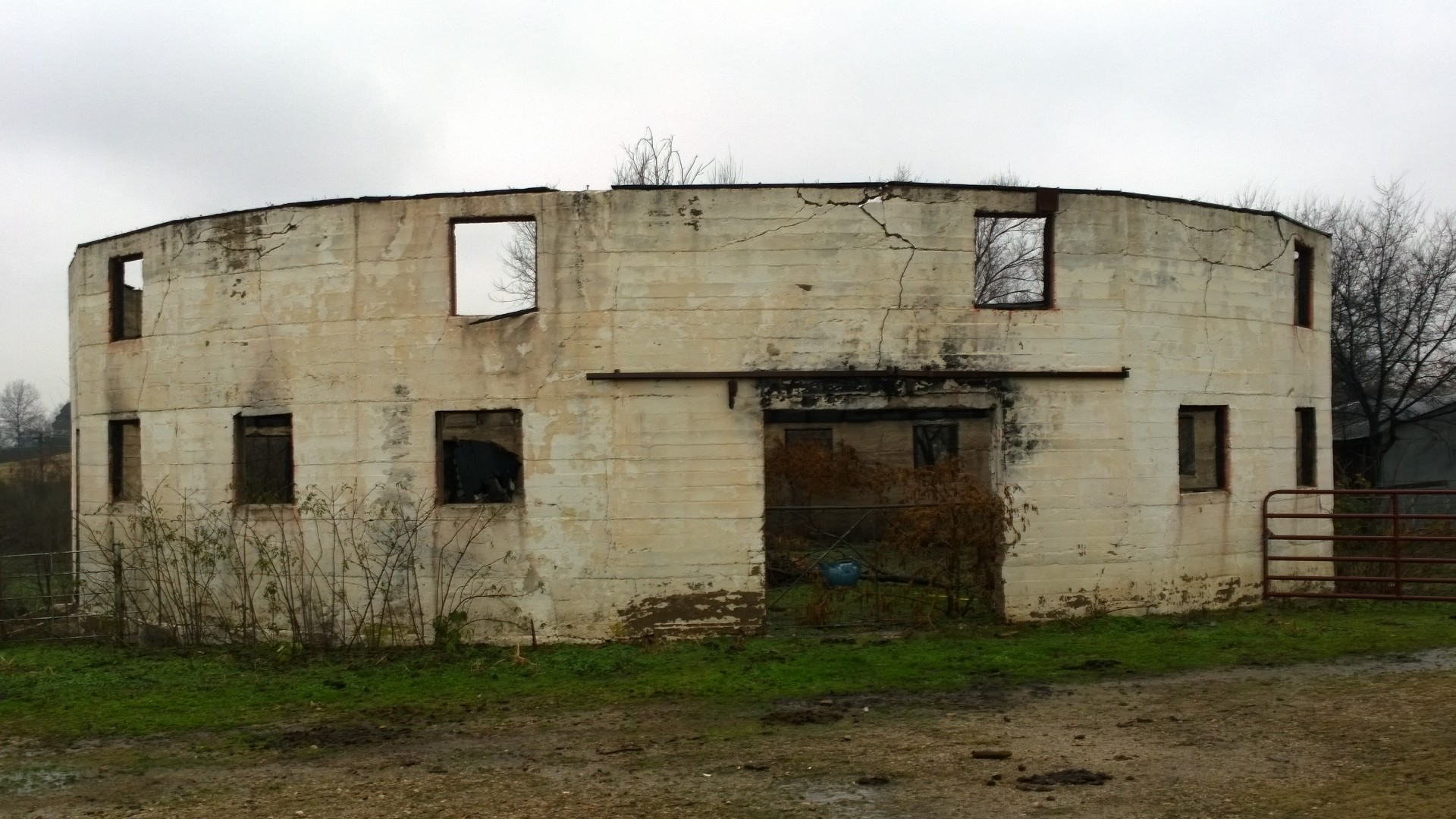
- Photo in January 2015

- Location within Oklahoma Location within the United States
- Location: 401 S. Adams St., Sallisaw, Oklahoma
- Coordinates: 35°26′55″N 94°47′17″W
- Area: less than one acre
- Built: 1913
- Built by: McCalman, Jerome
- NRHP reference No.: 84003432
- Added to NRHP: March 8, 1984

The Hines Round Barn in Sallisaw, Oklahoma, also known as Williams Barn, is a round barn that was built in 1913 for W.R. Hines. It was listed on the National Register of Historic Places in 1984.

It is approximately round, but in fact is multi-sided, having 20 approximately 10 feet (3.0 m) straight wall sections. Its roof was supported in the center by a circular scaffolding inside the barn. In 1983 the barn was about 200 feet (61 m) in circumference, had white walls, and had a silver-painted corrugated metal roof.
