= Akins, Oklahoma =

- CDP
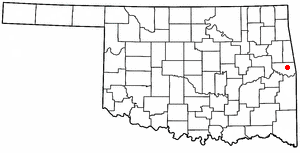
- Location of Akins, Oklahoma
- Coordinates: 35°30′16″N 94°40′12″W
- Country: United States
- State: Oklahoma
- County: Sequoyah

Area
  - Total: 13.65 sq mi (35.36 km^{2})
  - Land: 13.60 sq mi (35.22 km^{2})
  - Water: 0.054 sq mi (0.14 km^{2})
- Elevation: 600 ft (180 m)

Population (2020)
  - Total: 405
  - Density: 30/sq mi (11.5/km^{2})
- Time zone: UTC-6 (Central (CST))
  - Summer (DST): UTC-5 (CDT)
- FIPS code: 40-00900
- GNIS feature ID: 2407706

Akins is a census-designated place (CDP) in Sequoyah County, Oklahoma, United States. It is part of the Fort Smith, Arkansas-Oklahoma Metropolitan Statistical Area. As of the 2020 census, Akins had a population of 405.

The post office existed from February 16, 1894, until December 31, 1943. It is said to be named for Robert Akins, a mail carrier.

Sequoyah's Cabin, a national historic site, is located about two miles northeast of the town.

== Geography ==
According to the United States Census Bureau, the CDP has a total area of 13.6 square miles (35 km^{2}), all land.

== Demographics ==
Historical population
Census	Pop.	Note	%±
2000	449		—
2010	493		9.8%
2020	405		−17.8%
U.S. Decennial Census

=== 2020 census ===
As of the 2020 census, Akins had a population of 405. The median age was 49.5 years. 22.0% of residents were under the age of 18 and 20.2% of residents were 65 years of age or older. For every 100 females there were 104.5 males, and for every 100 females age 18 and over there were 110.7 males age 18 and over.

0% of residents lived in urban areas, while 100.0% lived in rural areas.

There were 162 households in Akins, of which 27.8% had children under the age of 18 living in them. Of all households, 54.9% were married-couple households, 22.8% were households with a male householder and no spouse or partner present, and 19.1% were households with a female householder and no spouse or partner present. About 24.1% of all households were made up of individuals and 12.9% had someone living alone who was 65 years of age or older.

There were 179 housing units, of which 9.5% were vacant. The homeowner vacancy rate was 0% and the rental vacancy rate was 0%.

Racial composition as of the 2020 census
Race	Number	Percent
White	249	61.5%
Black or African American	0	0%
American Indian and Alaska Native	103	25.4%
Asian	0	0%
Native Hawaiian and Other Pacific Islander	0	0%
Some other race	1	0.2%
Two or more races	52	12.8%
Hispanic or Latino (of any race)	2	0.5%

=== 2010 census ===
As of the census of 2010, there were 493 people residing in Akins. The population density was 33.1 inhabitants per square mile (12.8/km^{2}). There were 197 housing units at an average density of 15/sq mi (6/km^{2}). The racial makeup of the CDP was 70.16% White, 1.56% African American, 15.81% Native American, 0.22% from other races, and 12.25% from two or more races. Hispanic or Latino of any race were 1.34% of the population.

There were 164 households, out of which 40.2% had children under the age of 18 living with them, 70.1% were married couples living together, 6.7% had a female householder with no husband present, and 18.9% were non-families. 15.9% of all households were made up of individuals, and 6.7% had someone living alone who was 65 years of age or older. The average household size was 2.74 and the average family size was 3.05.

In the CDP, the population was spread out, with 29.0% under the age of 18, 5.6% from 18 to 24, 30.3% from 25 to 44, 23.8% from 45 to 64, and 11.4% who were 65 years of age or older. The median age was 37 years. For every 100 females, there were 104.1 males. For every 100 females age 18 and over, there were 107.1 males.

The median income for a household in the CDP was $28,750, and the median income for a family was $27,143. Males had a median income of $22,083 versus $16,750 for females. The per capita income for the CDP was $11,996. About 18.0% of families and 20.6% of the population were below the poverty line, including 29.6% of those under age 18 and 12.5% of those age 65 or over.

=== 2000 census ===
As of the 2000 census, there were 449 people residing in Akins.
